= Cuisine of Karachi =

Culinary traditions of Karachi, Pakistan

Karachi cuisine (Urdu: کراچی پکوان) refers to the cuisine found mainly in the city of Karachi, Sindh, Pakistan. It is a multicultural cuisine as a result of the city consisting of various ethnic groups from different parts of Pakistan. Karachi is considered the melting pot of Pakistan.

The cuisine of Karachi is strongly influenced by the city's Muhajir population, who came from various parts of British India and settled primarily in Karachi after the independence of Pakistan in 1947. Most Urdu speaking Muslims have traditionally been based in Karachi, hence the city is known for multi cultural tastes in its cuisine. These Muslims maintained their old established culinary traditions, including variety of dishes and beverages.

Karachi cuisine is renowned for its cultural fusion, due to various empires and peoples living in this mega city. As a result many multi ethnic cuisines collaboratively had an influence on the style of Karachi food. The Pakistani cuisines such as Sindhi cuisine, Punjabi cuisine, Pashtun cuisine, Kalash cuisine, Saraiki cuisine, Kashmiri cuisine, Balochi cuisine, Chitrali cuisine and other regional cuisines have also influenced the cuisine of Karachi.

== Gallery ==
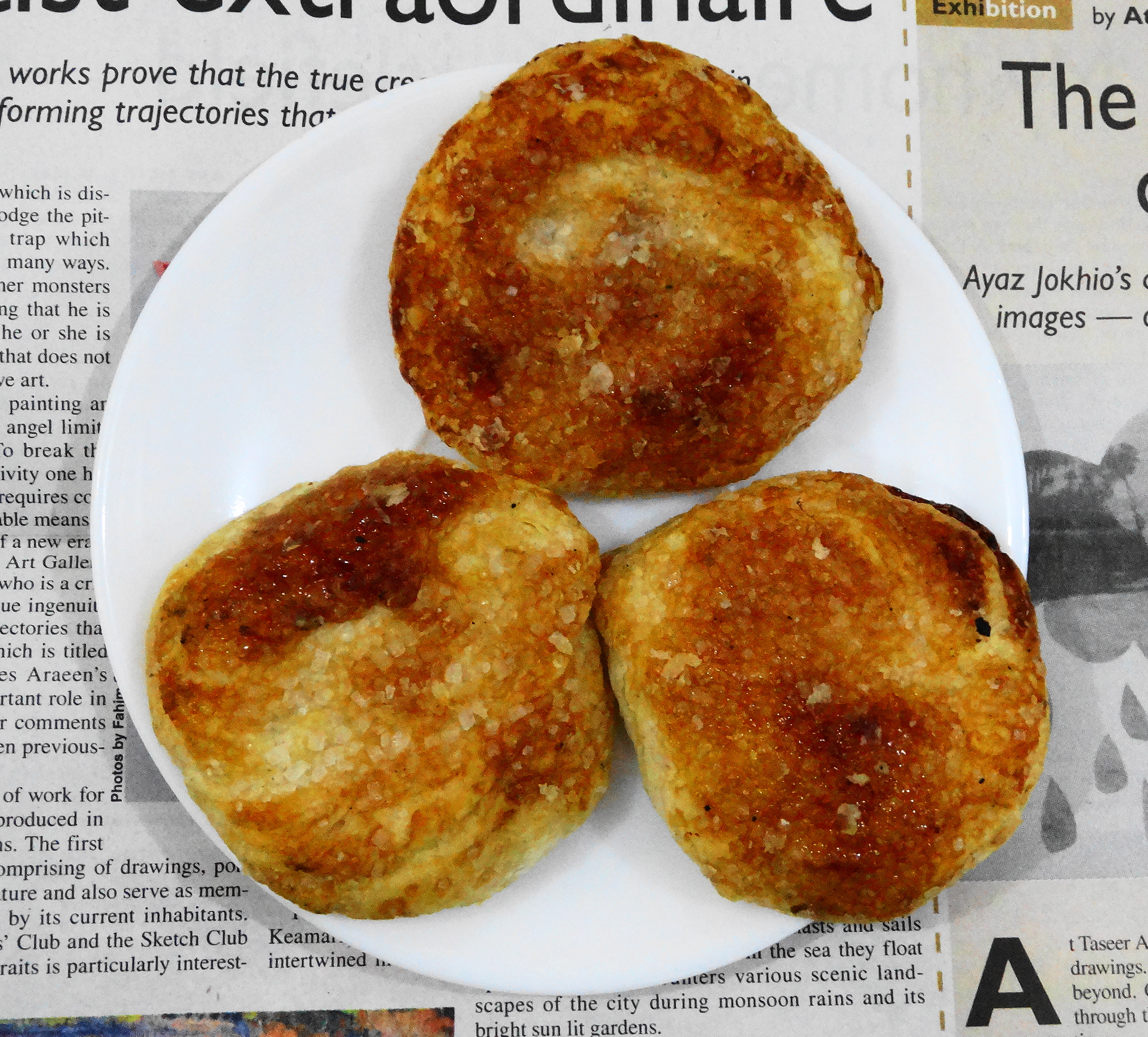
Baqerkhani

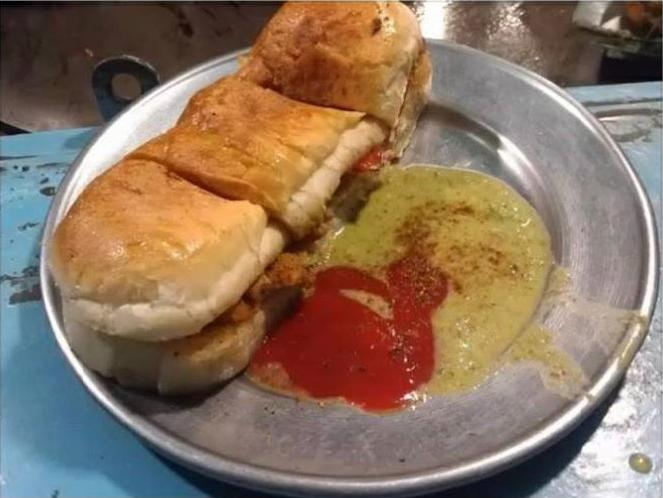
Bun kebab

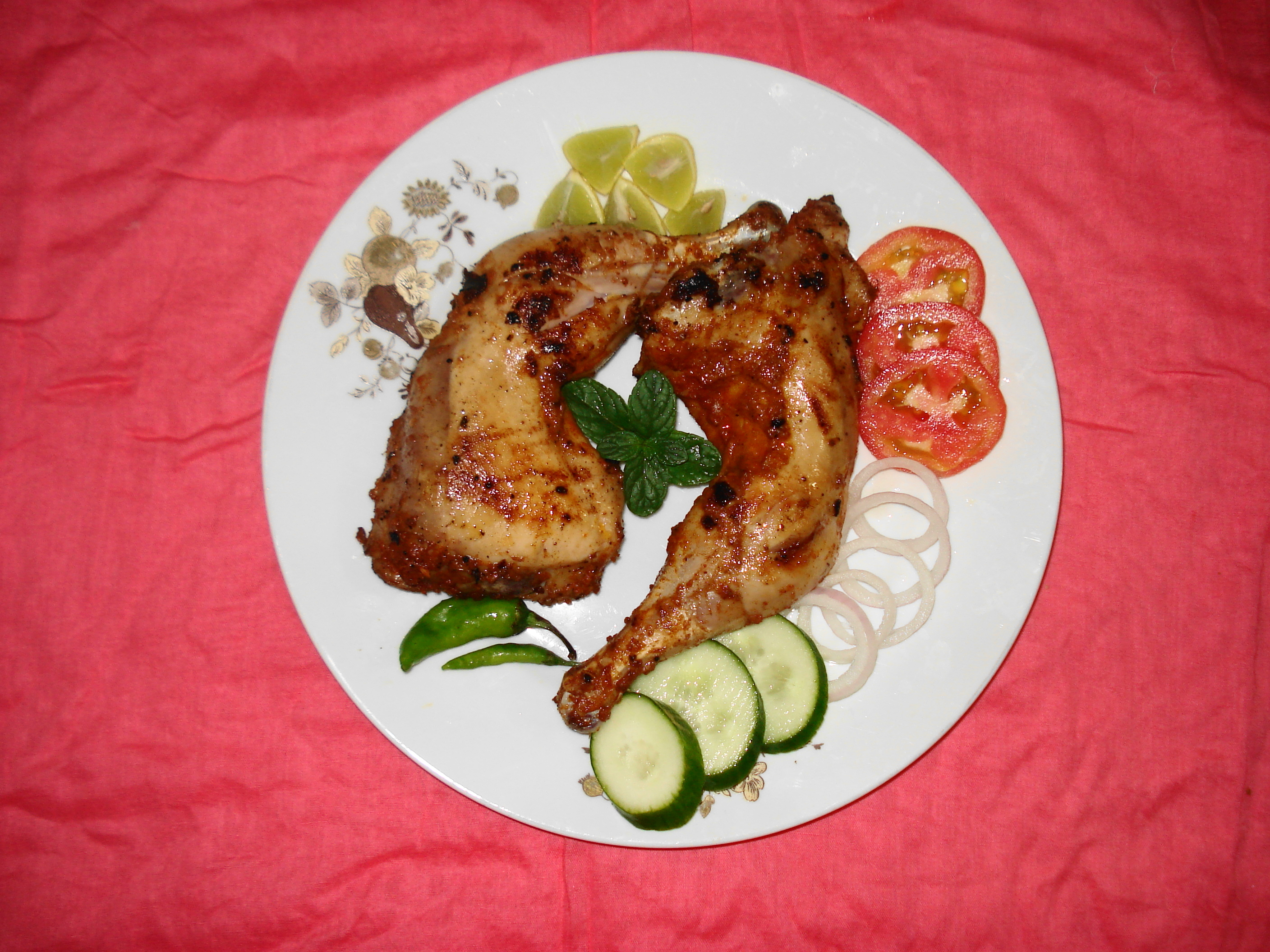
Chicken tikka

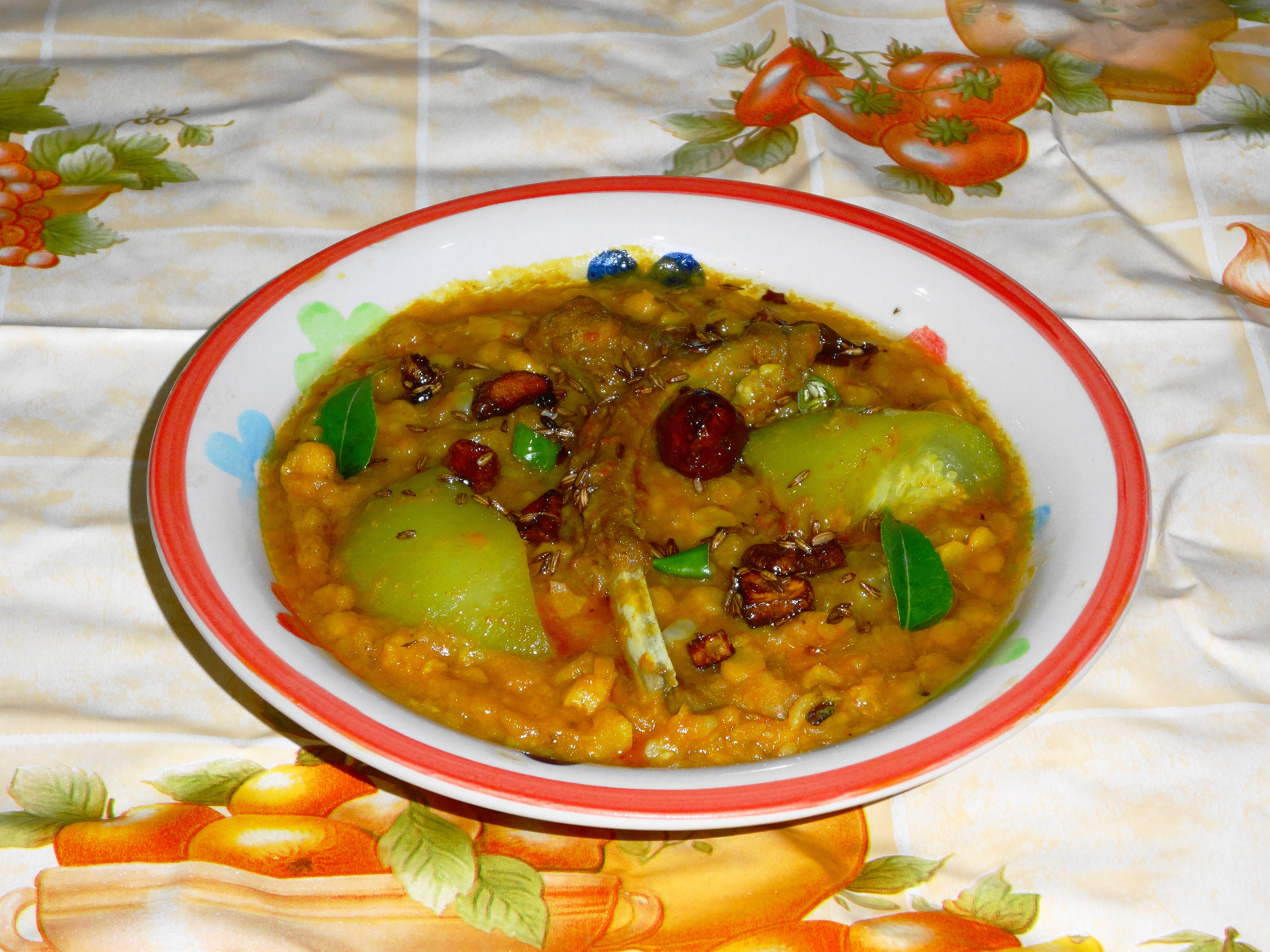
Dal Gosht

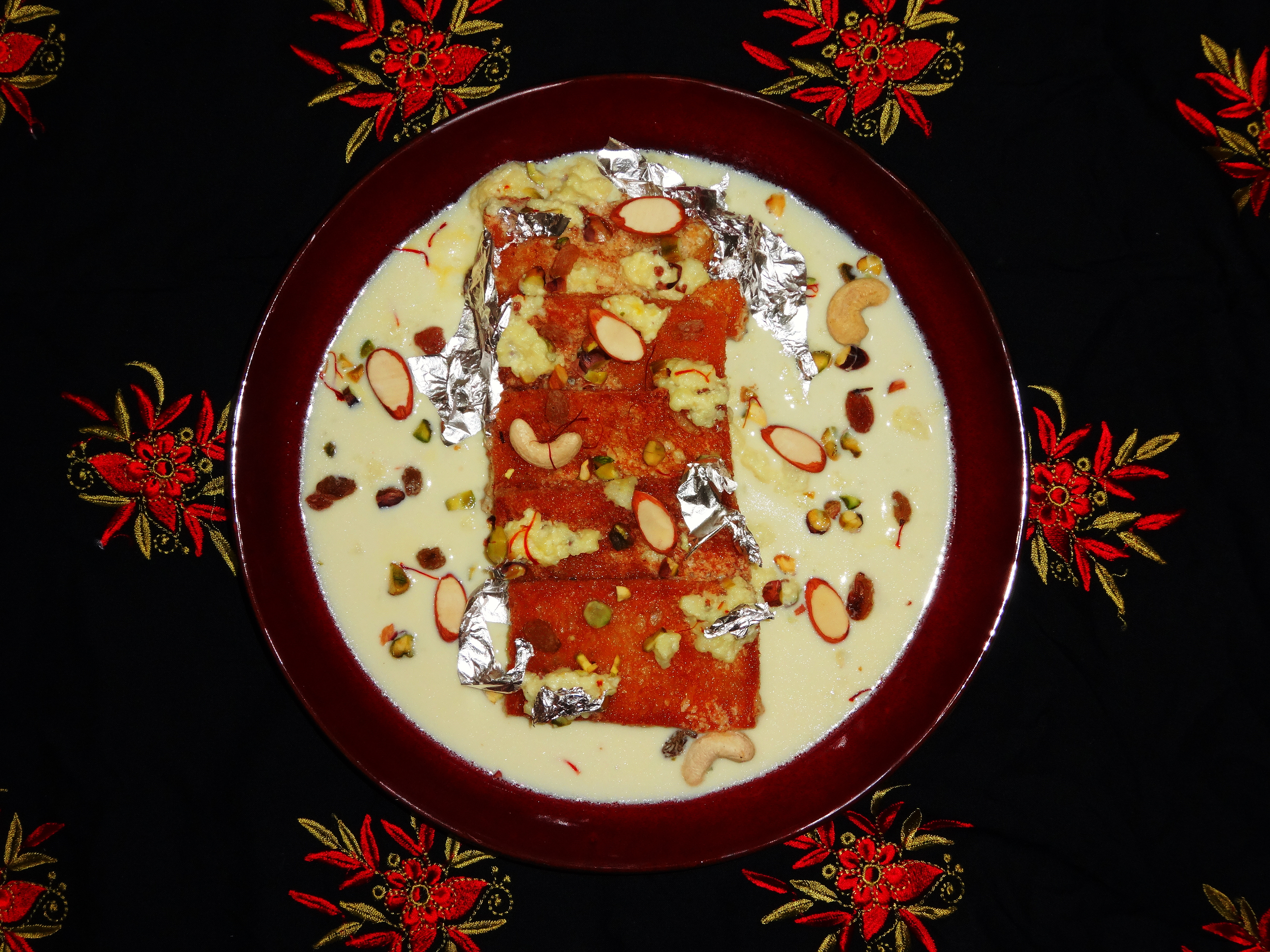
Double ka meetha

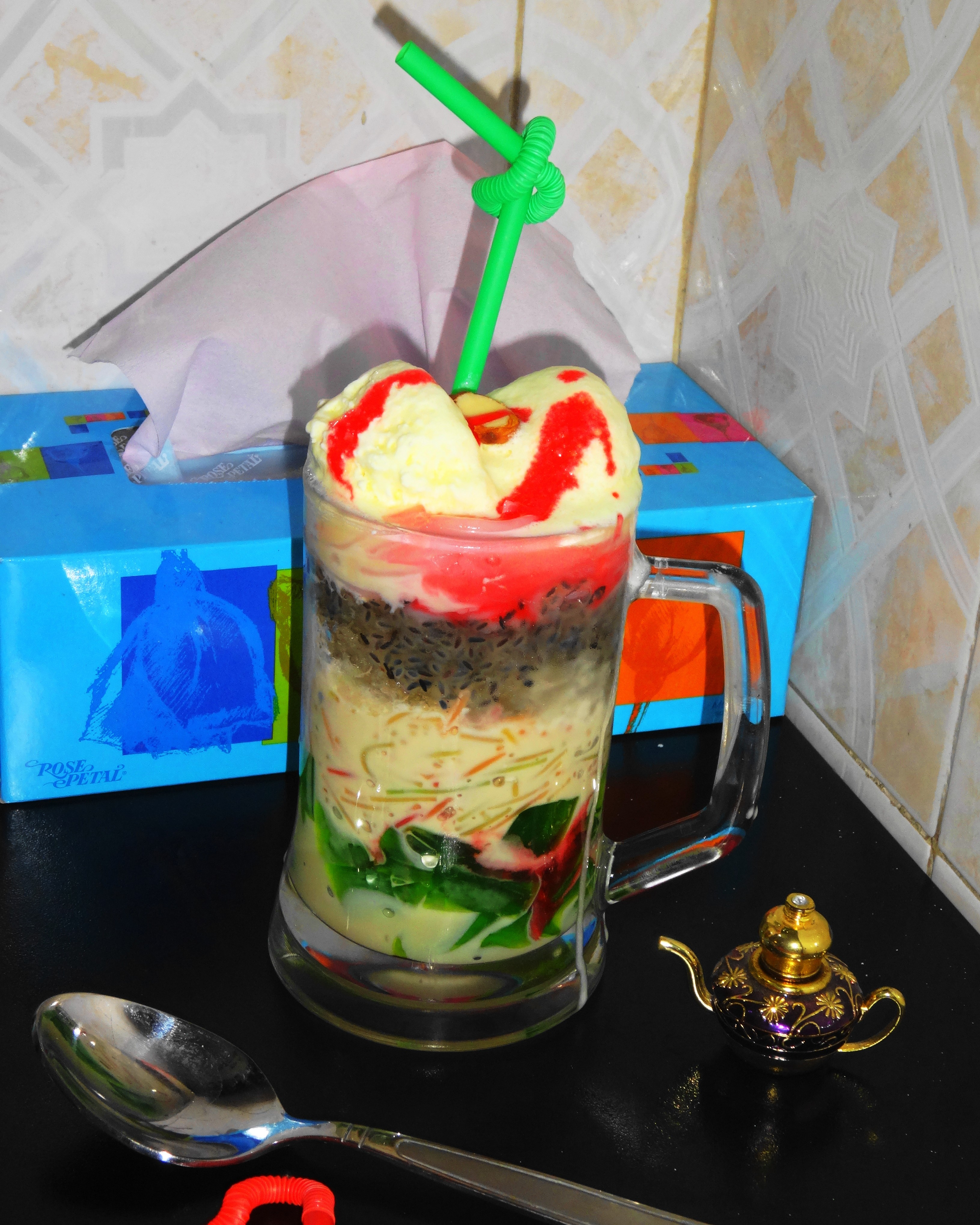
Falooda

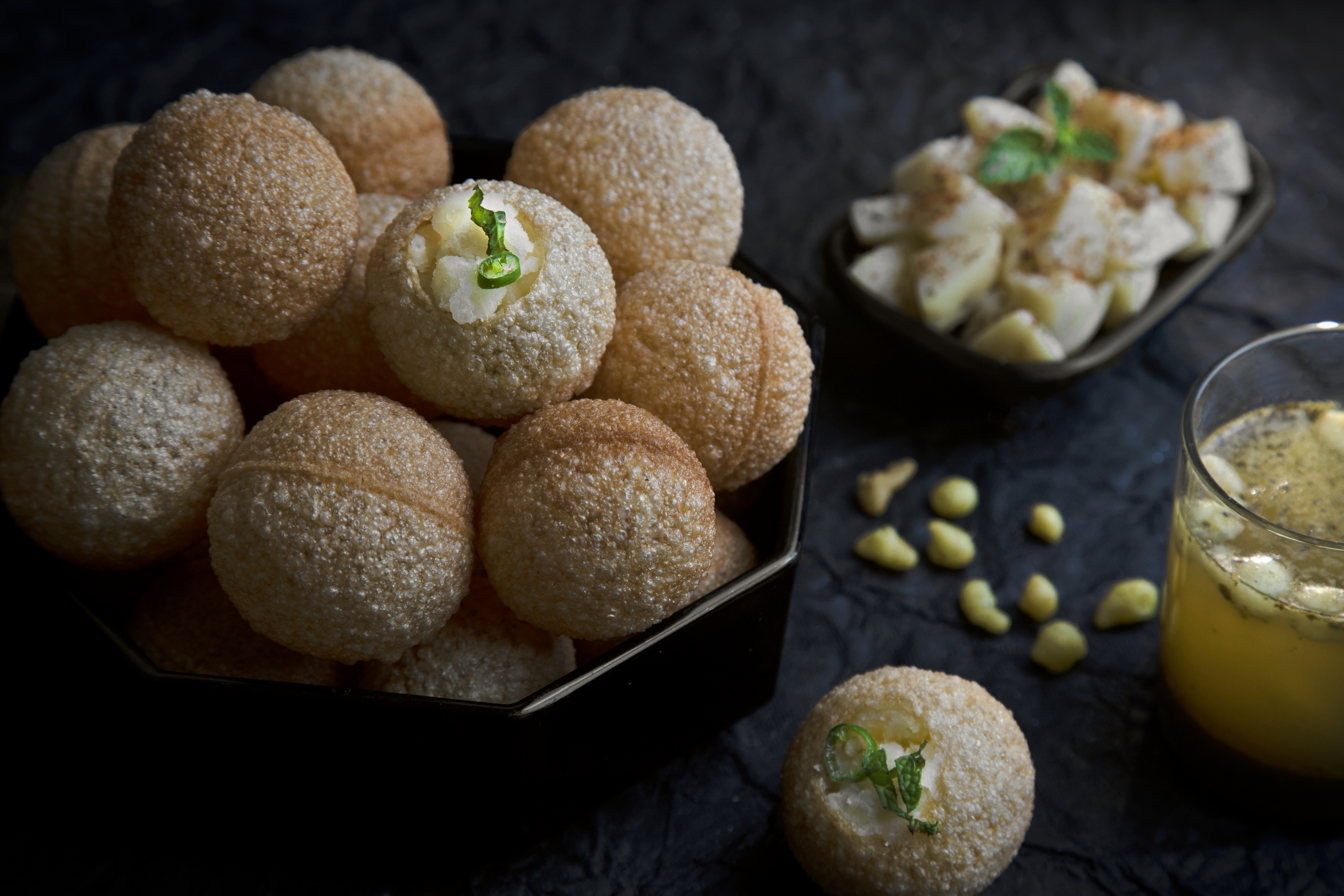
Golgappa/Panipuri

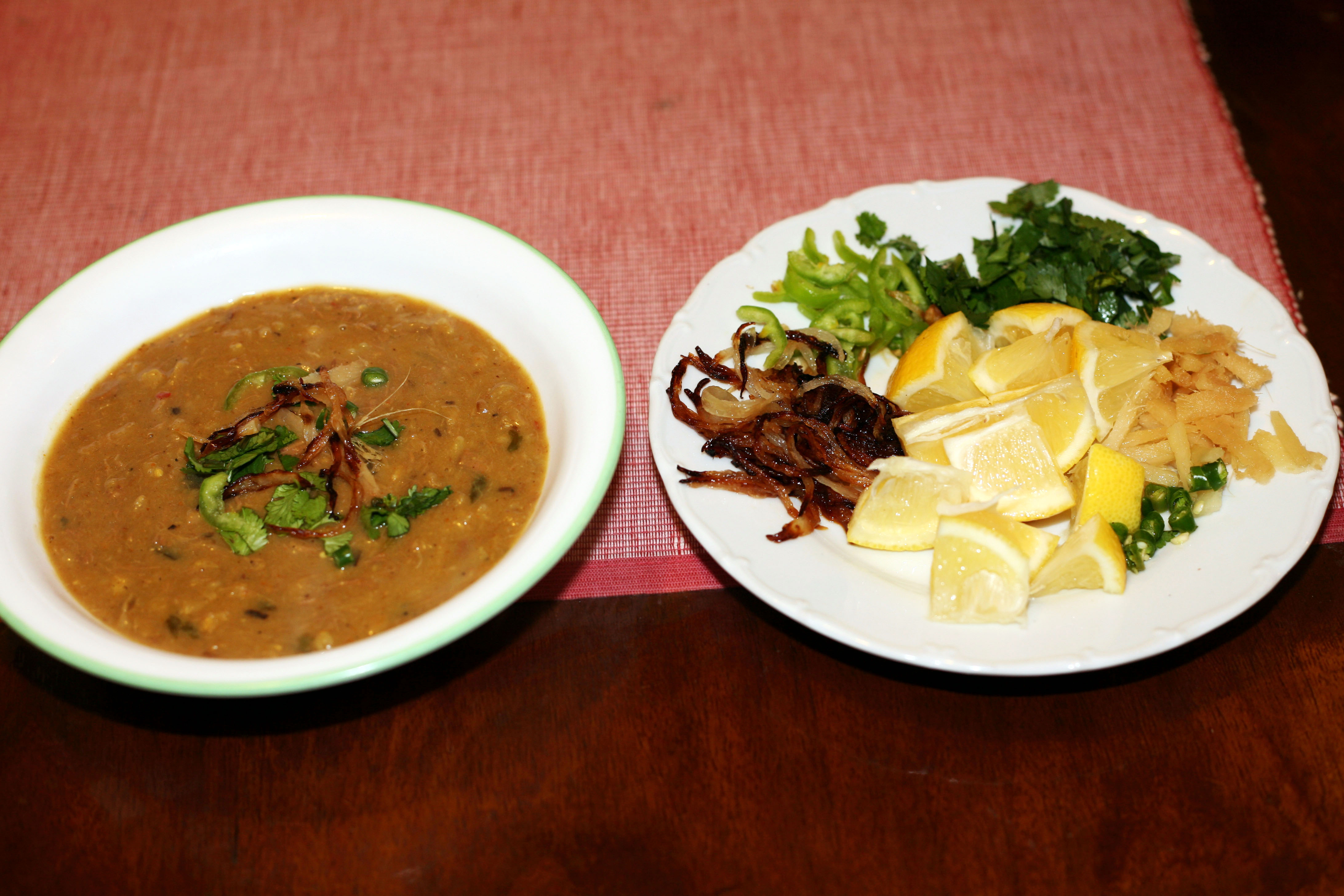
Haleem served with garnish

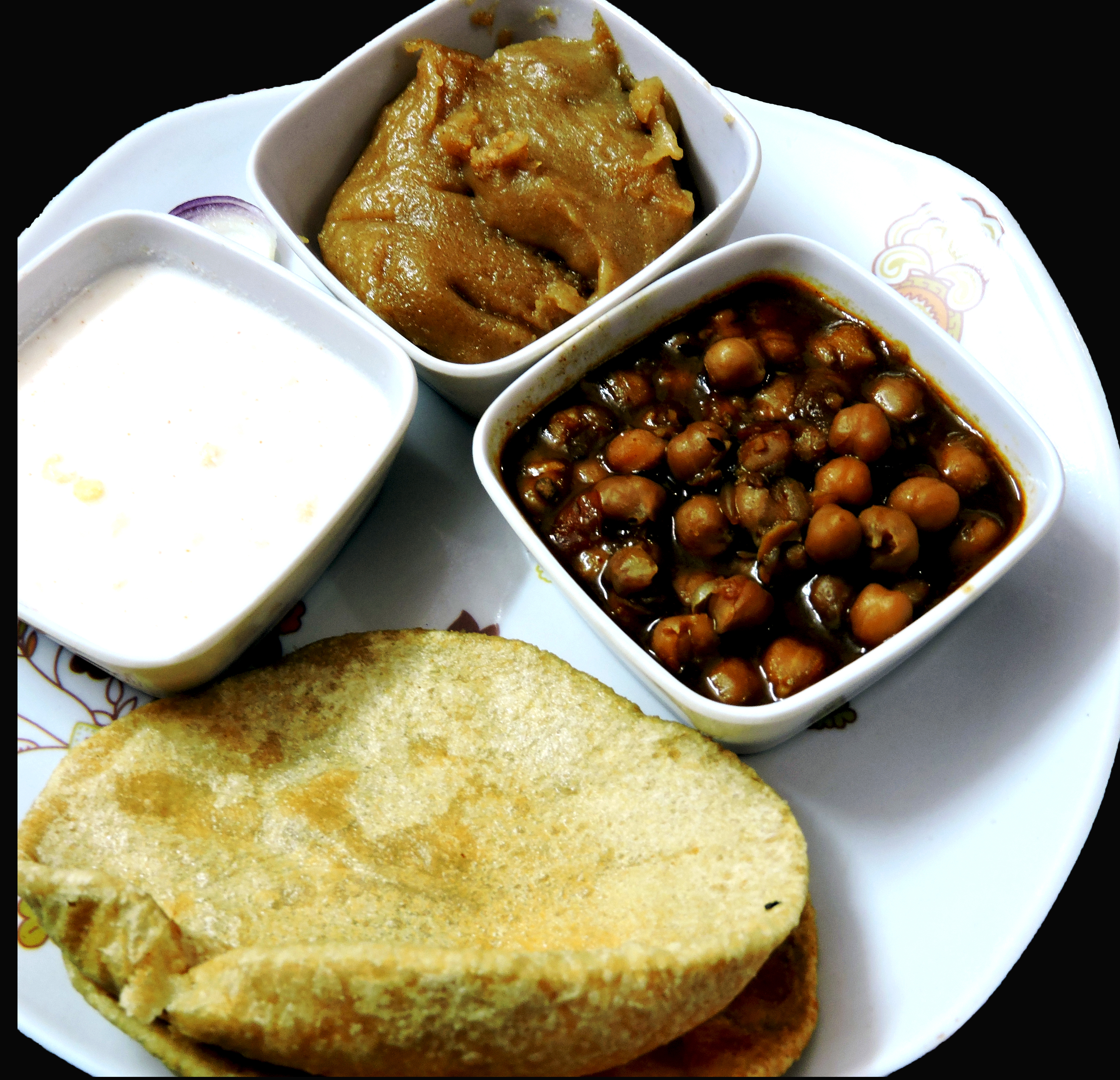
Halwa poori

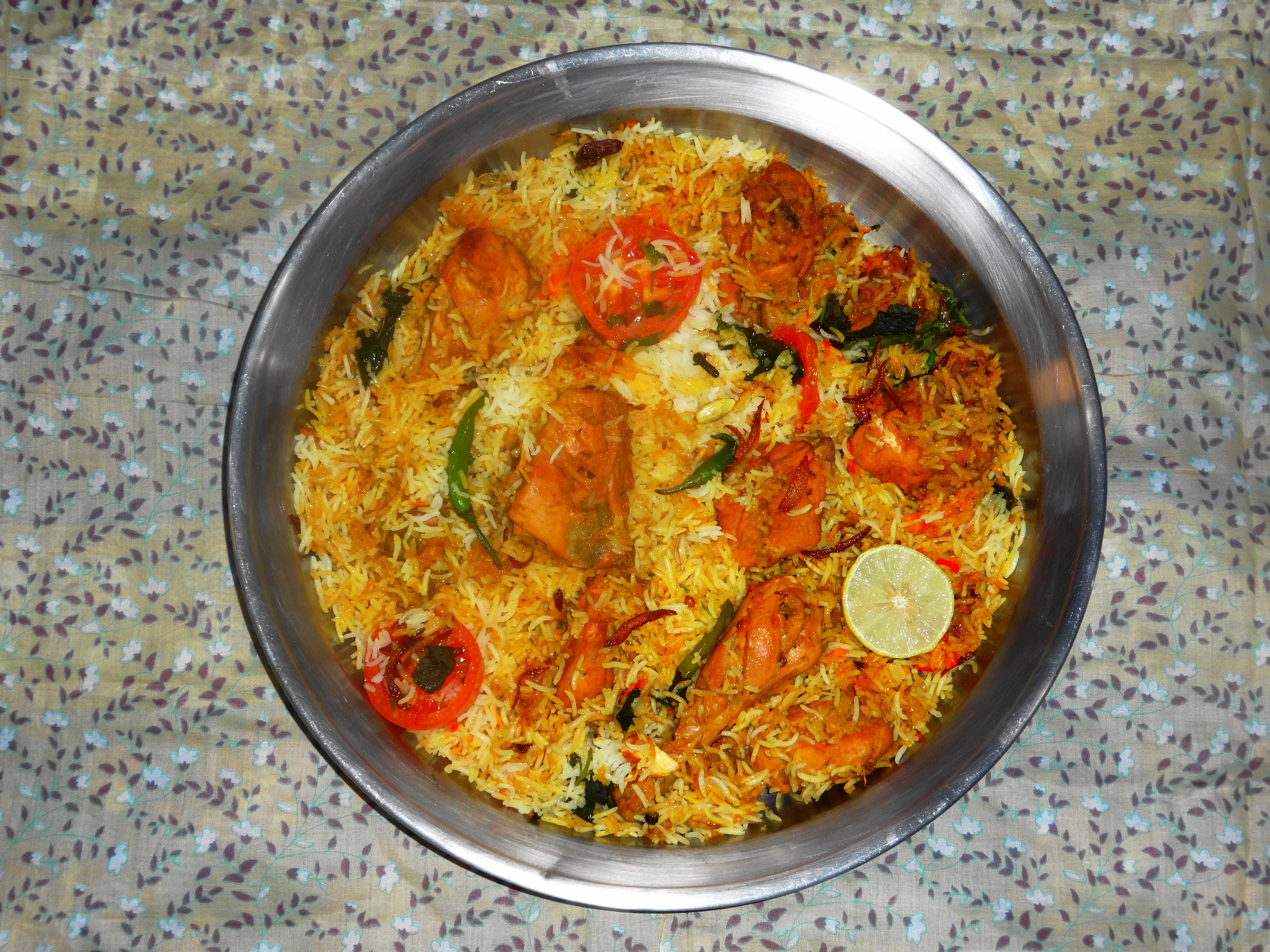
Sindhi biryani

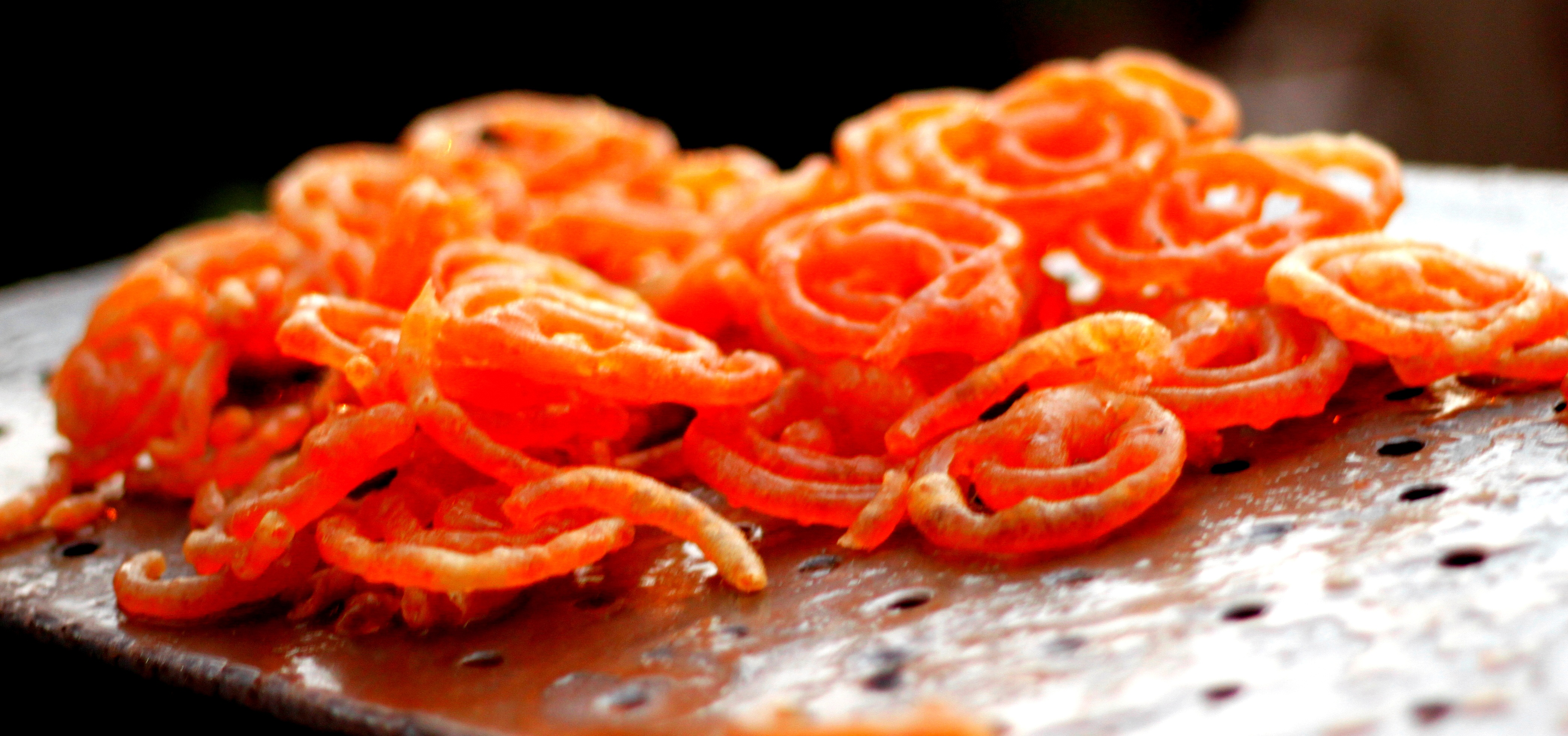
Jalebi

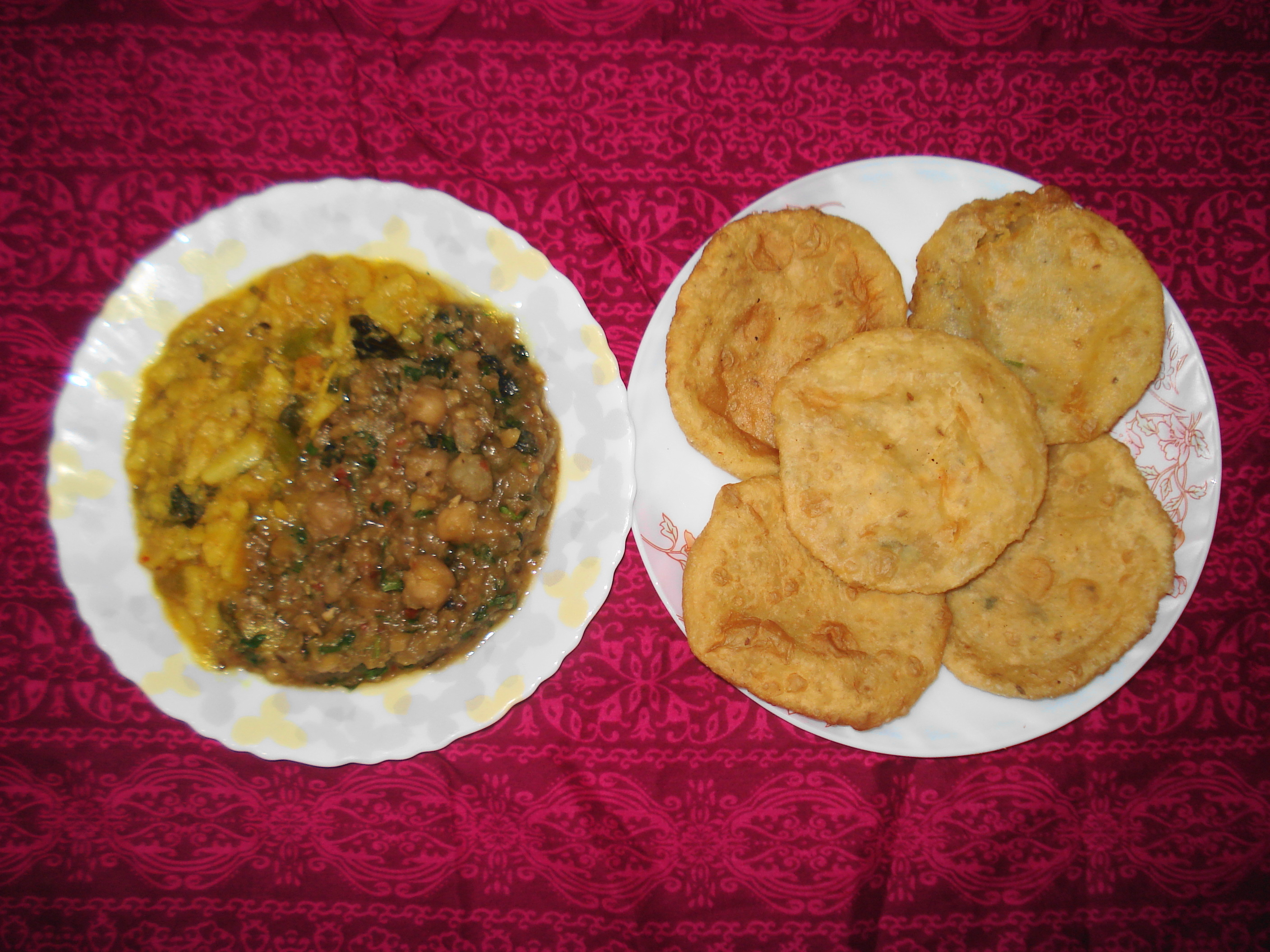
Kachori

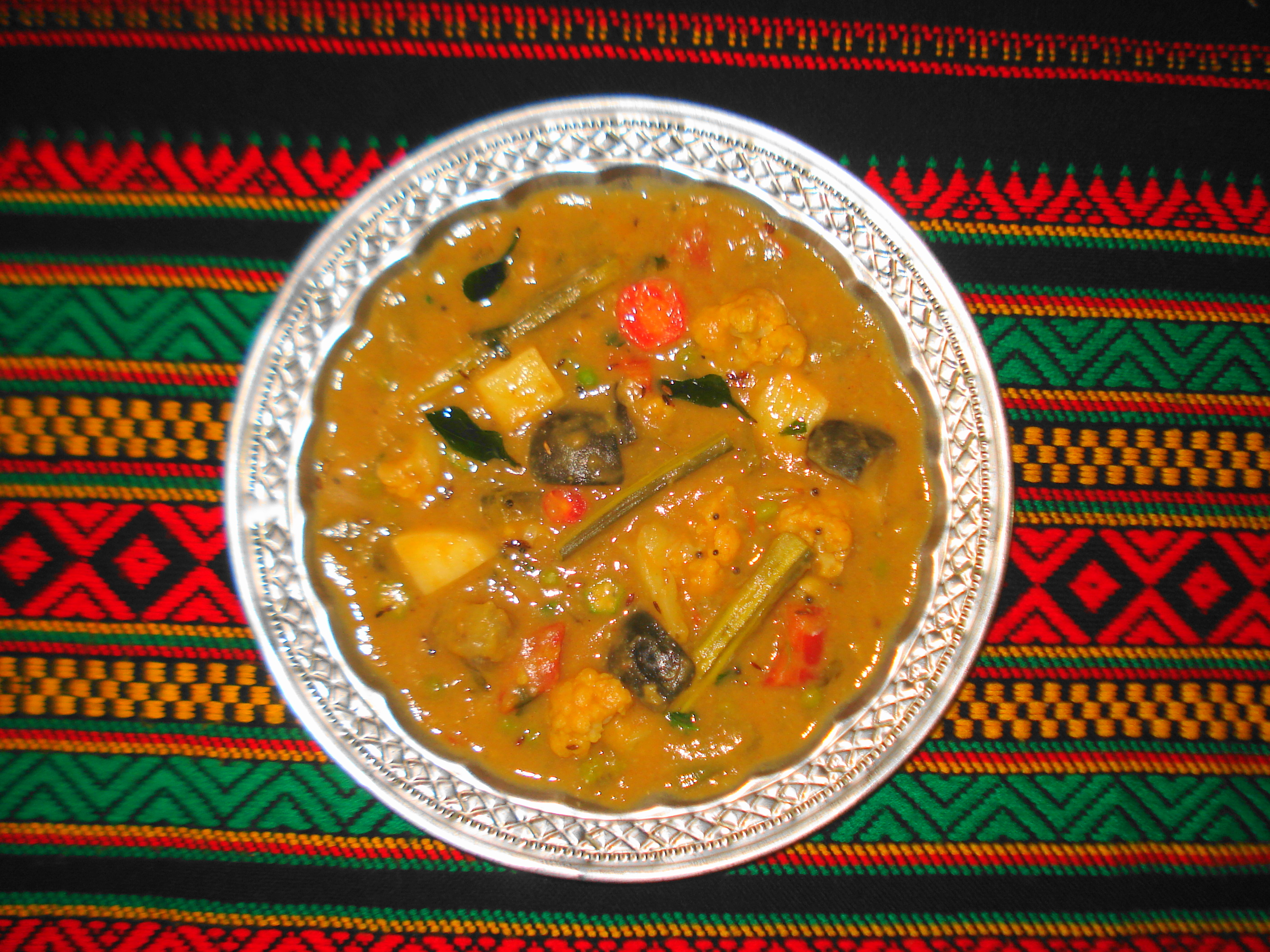
Sindhi Kadhi

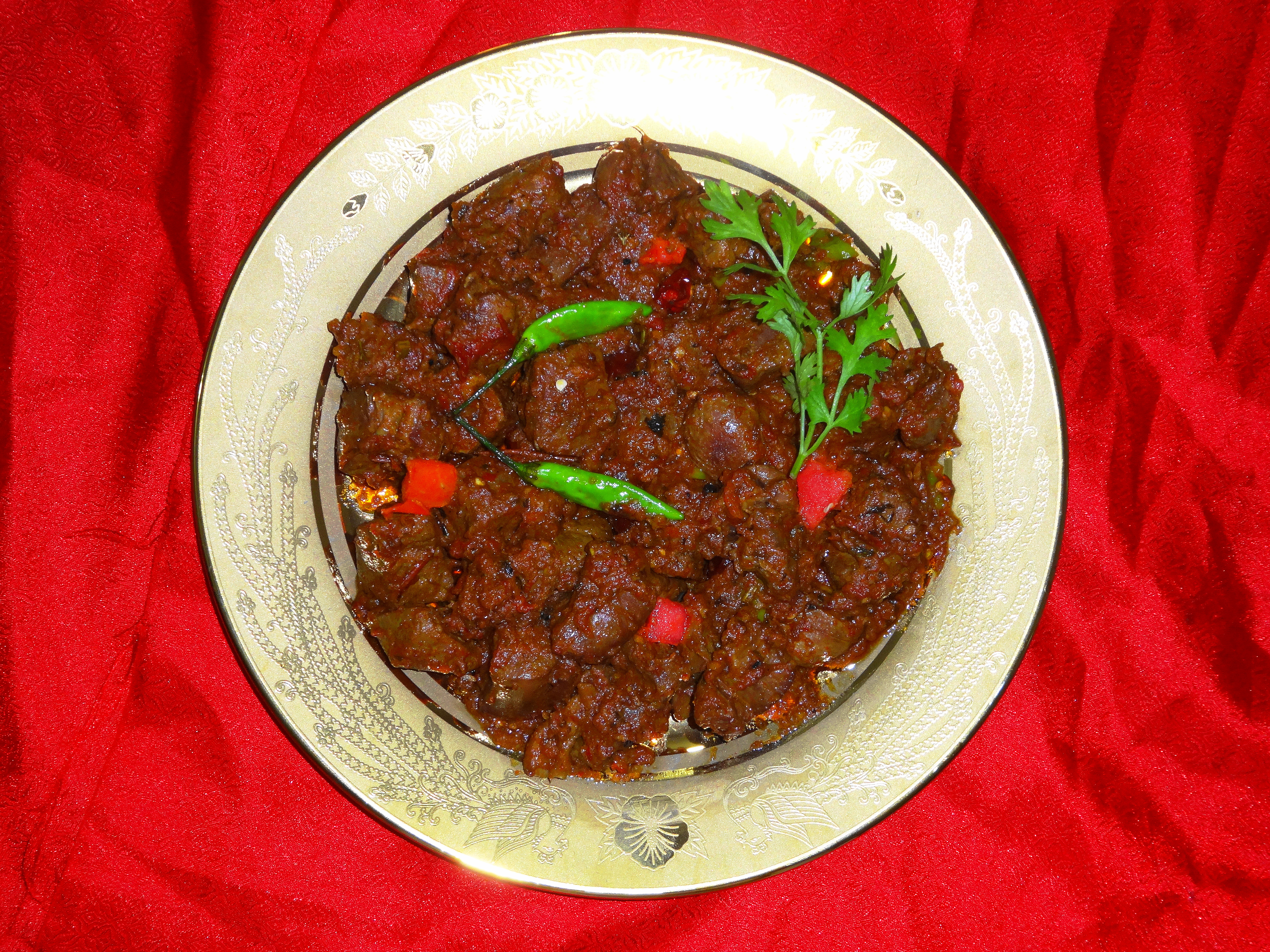
Kata-kat

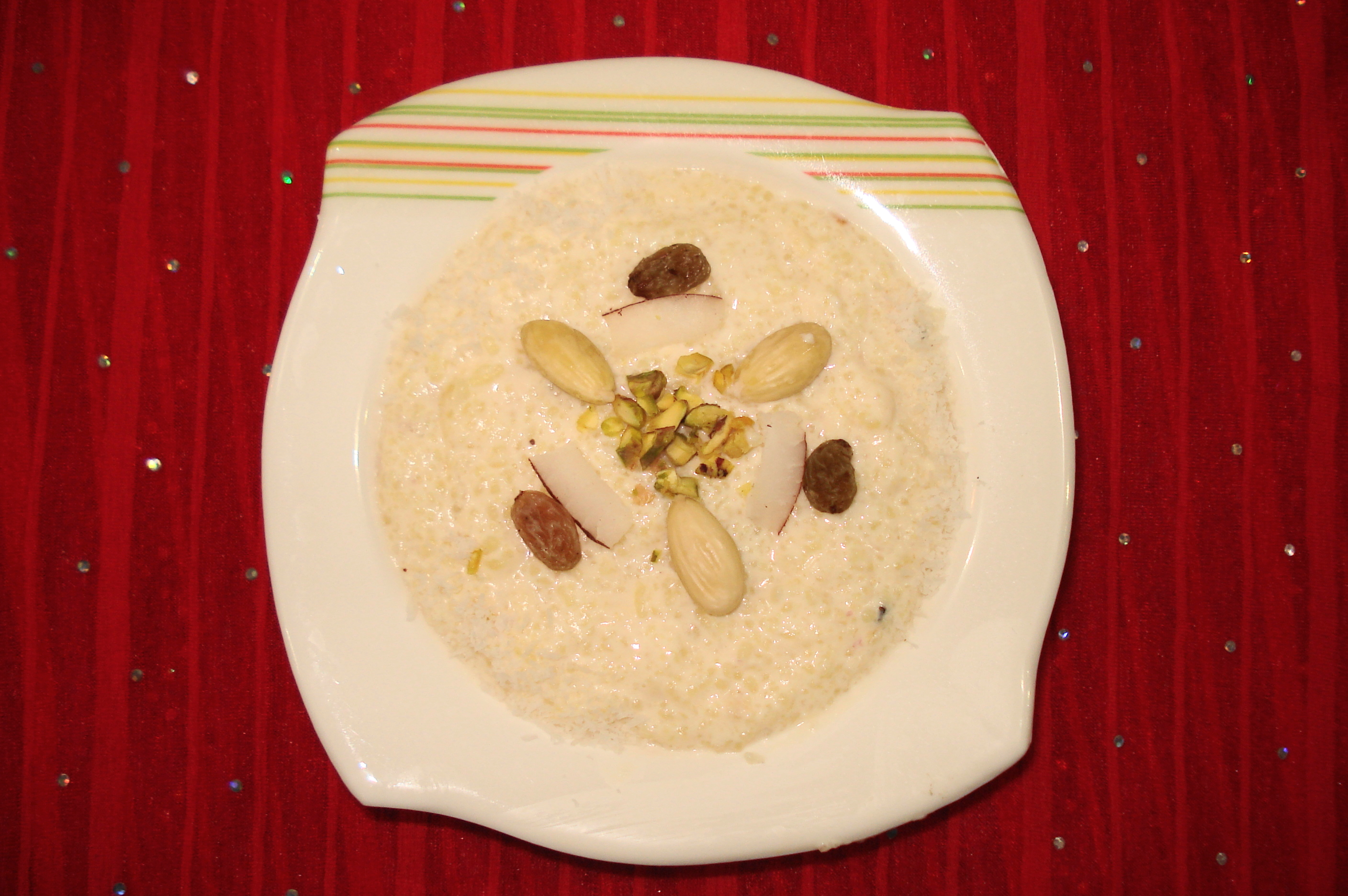
Kheer

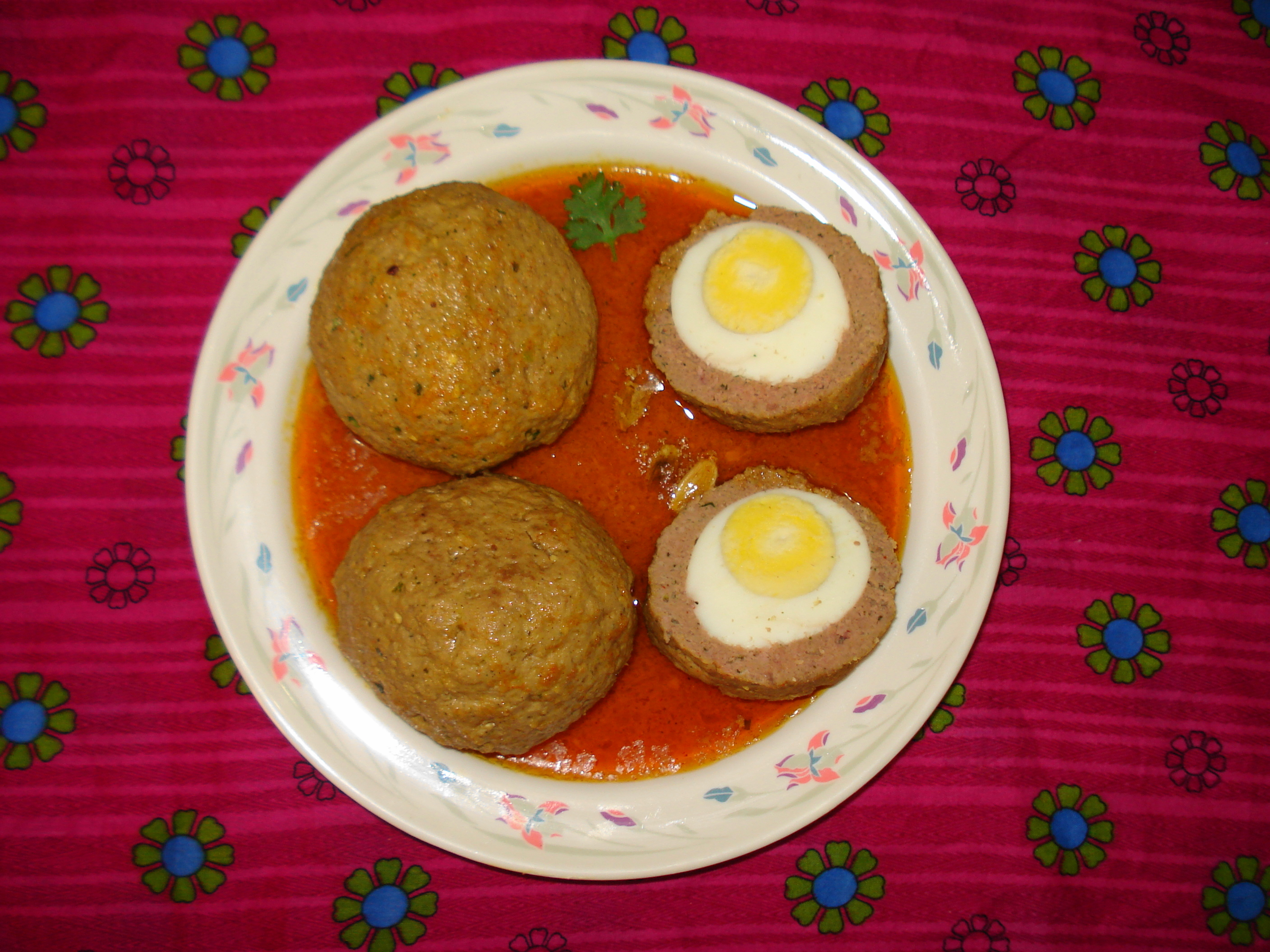
Kofta/Nargisi kofta

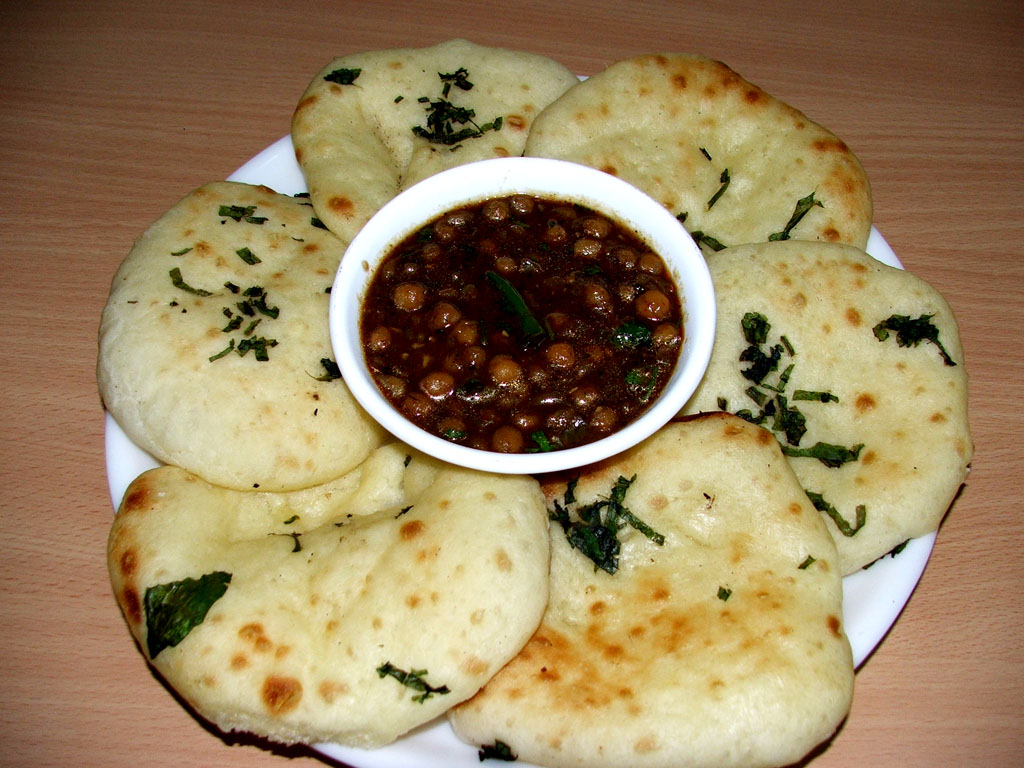
Kulcha with Choley

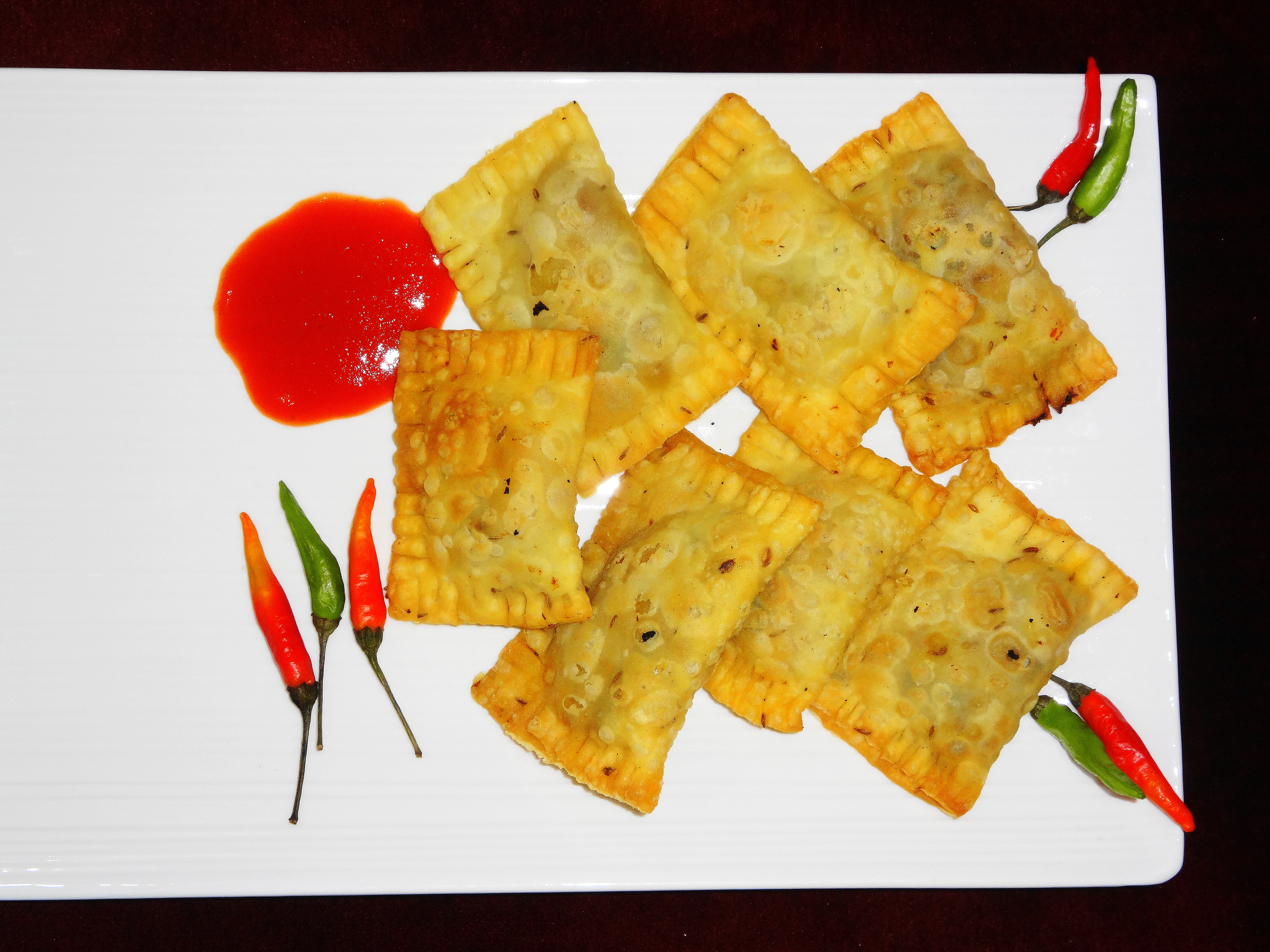
Lukhmi

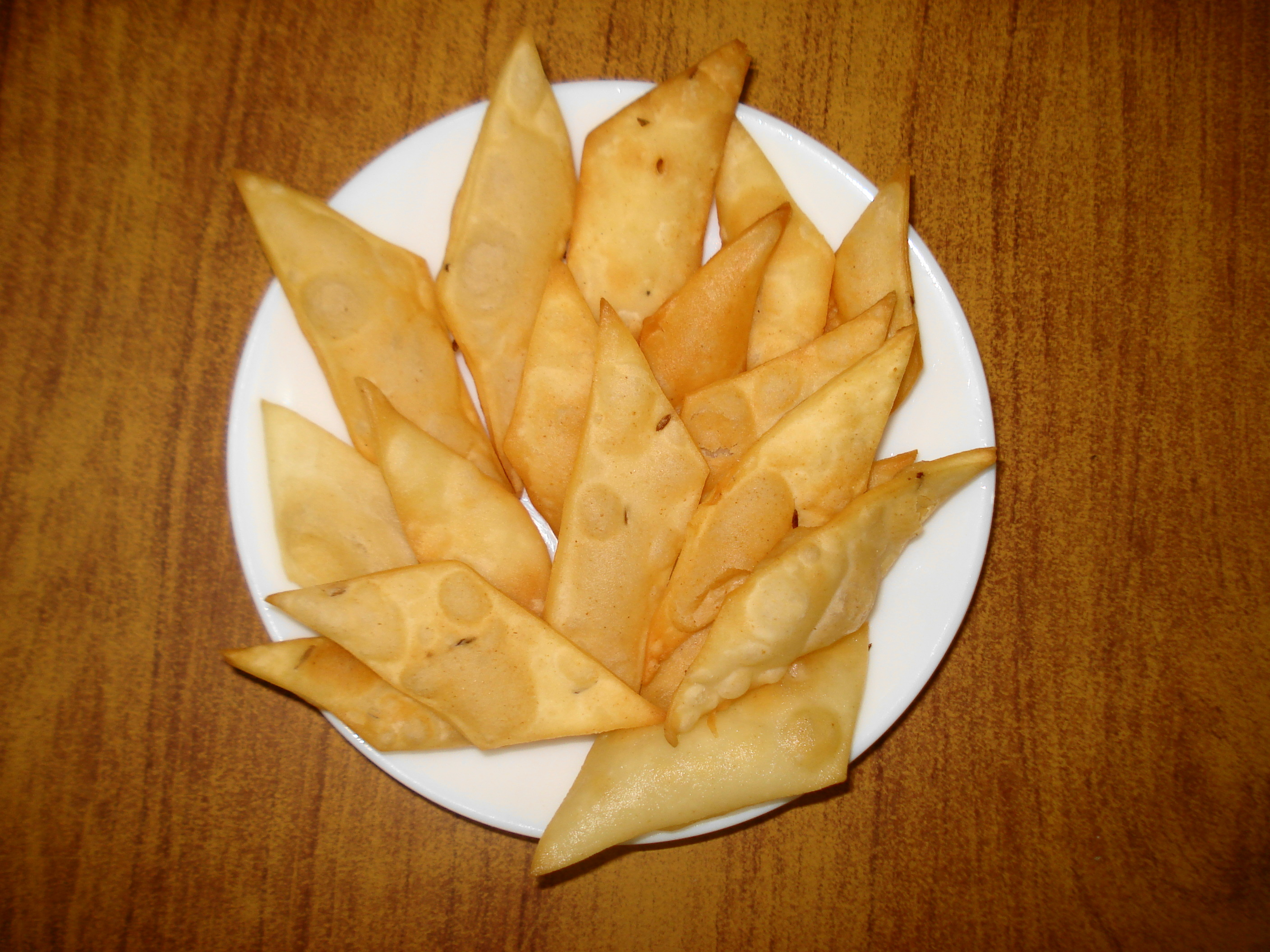
Namak Paray

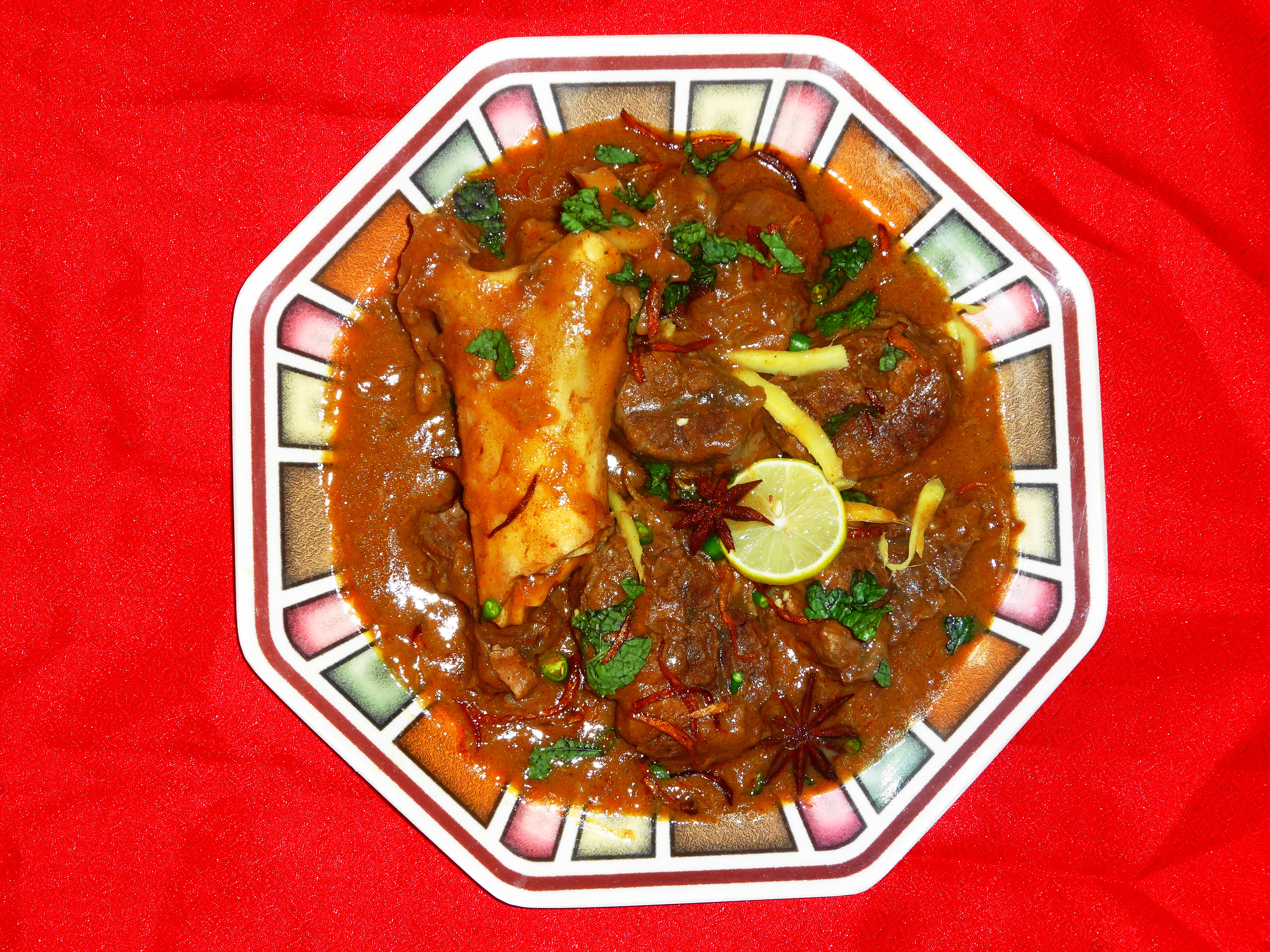
Nihari

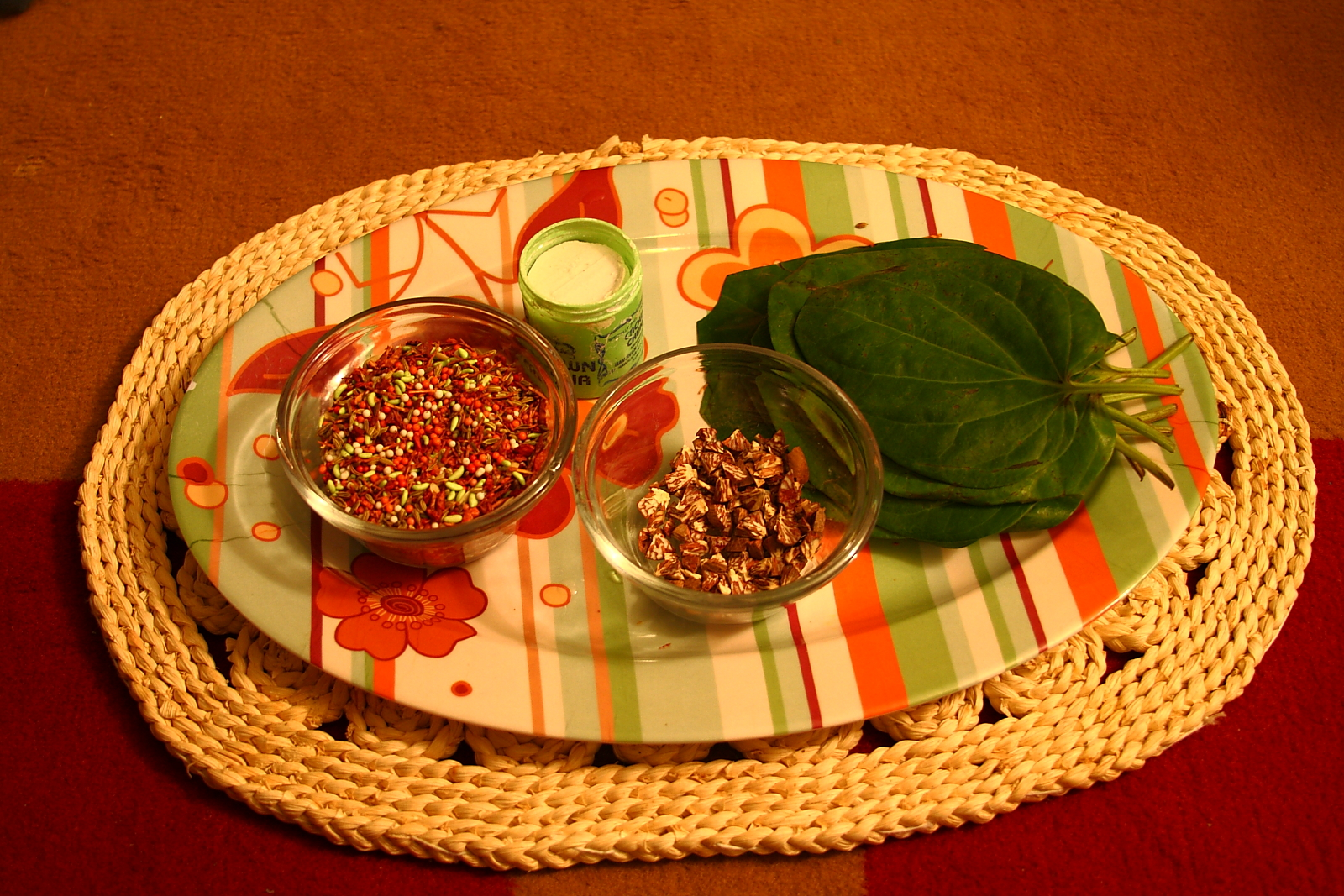
Paan

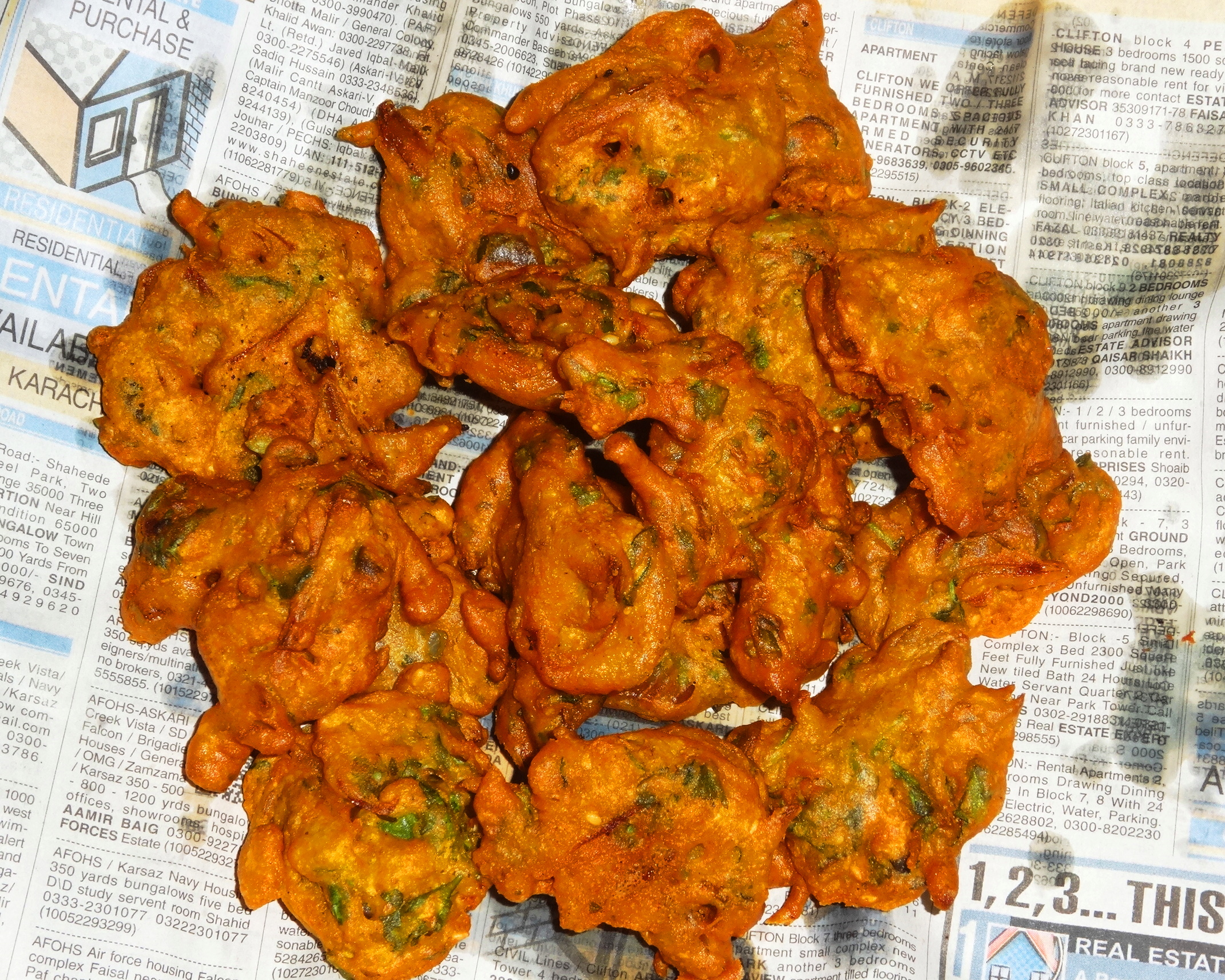
Pakora

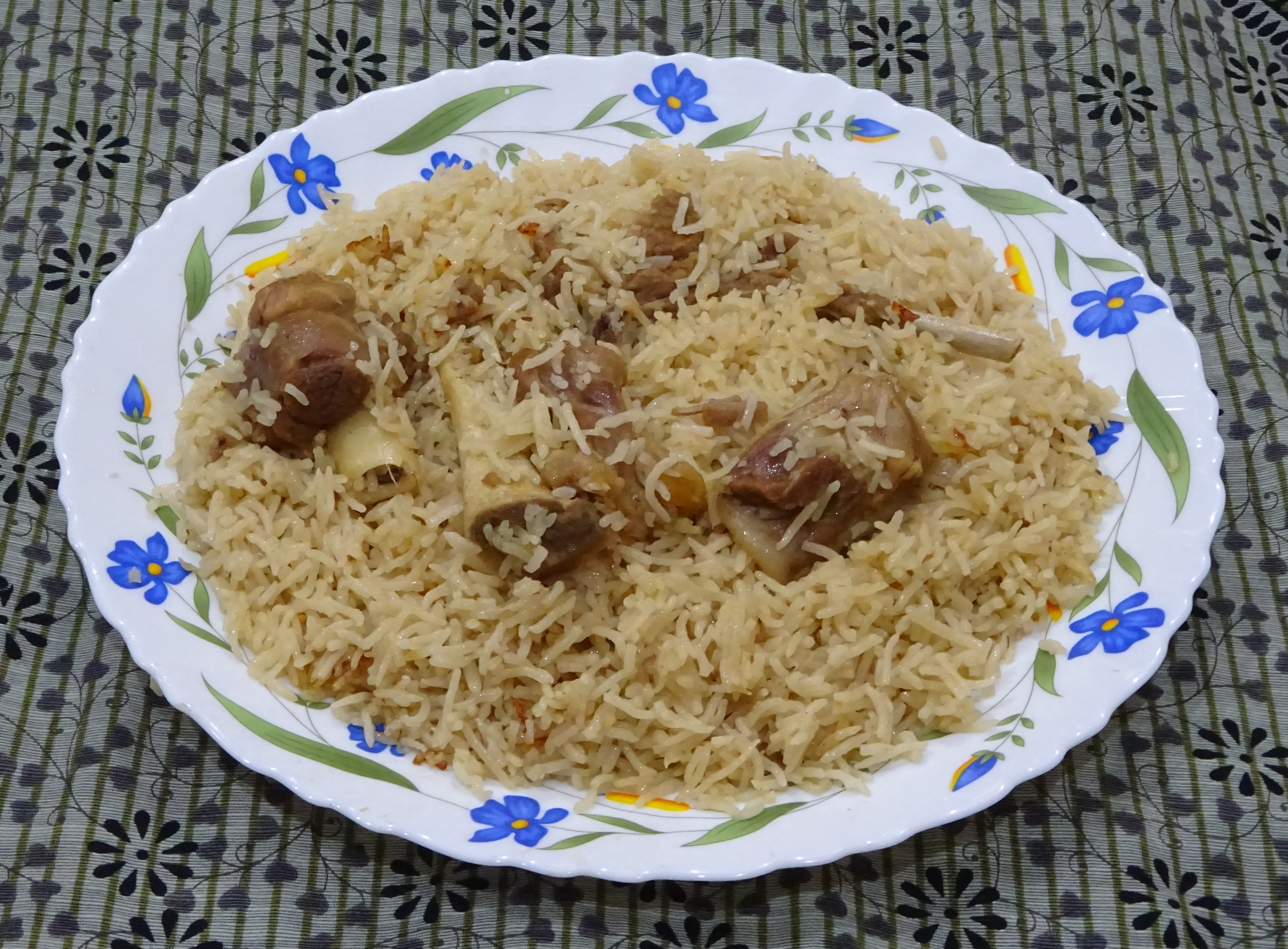
Pulao

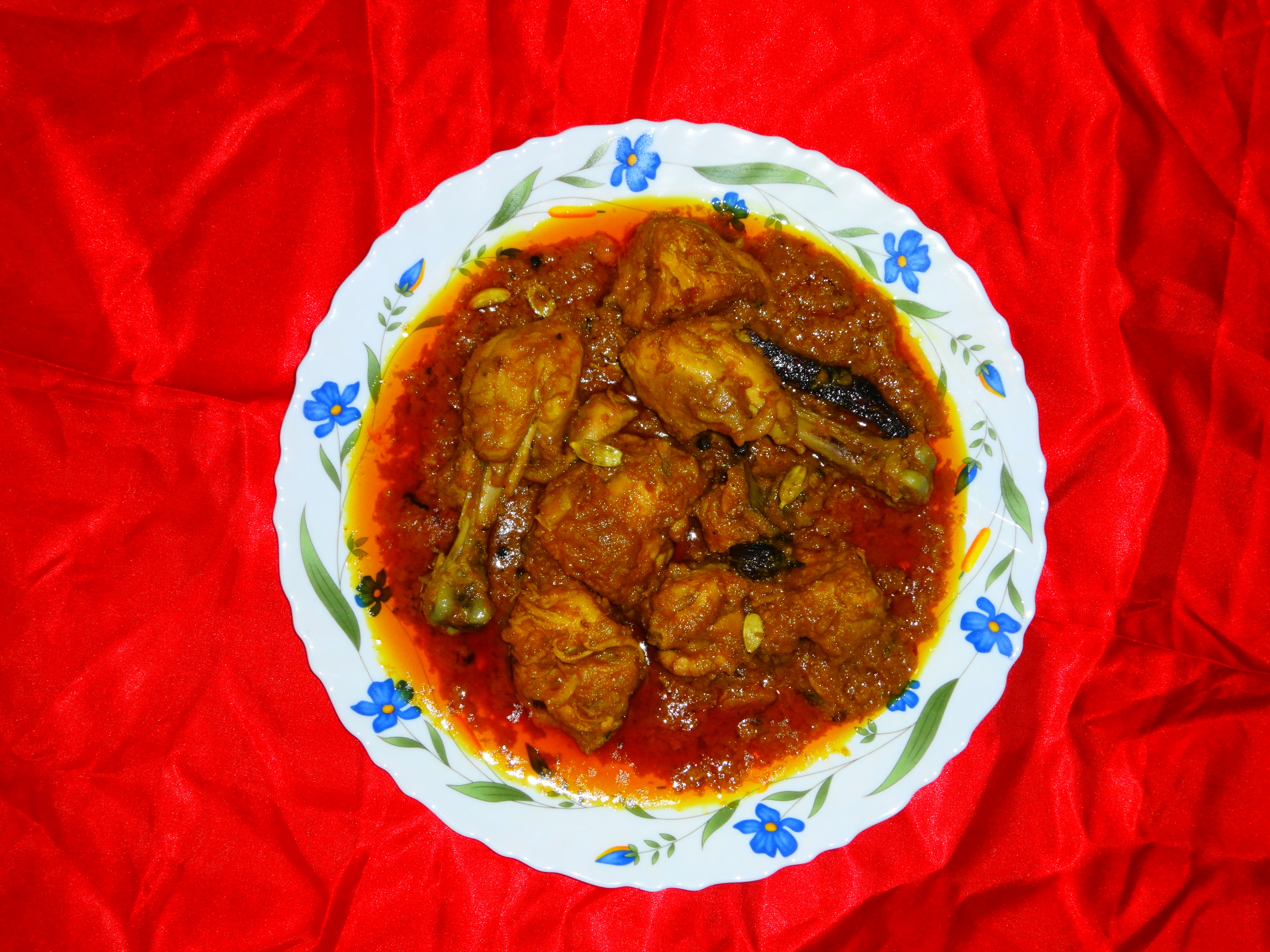
Qorma

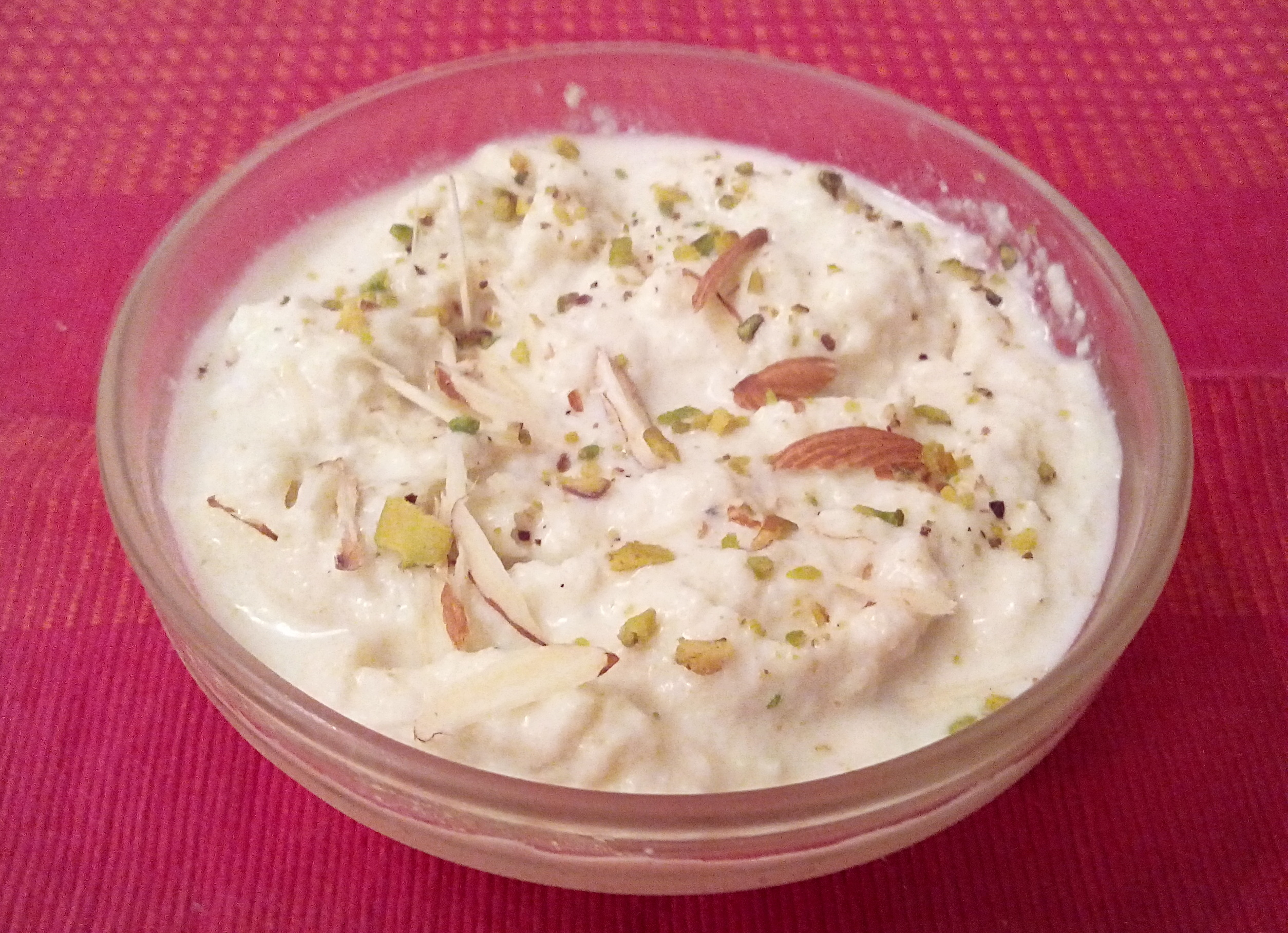
Rabri

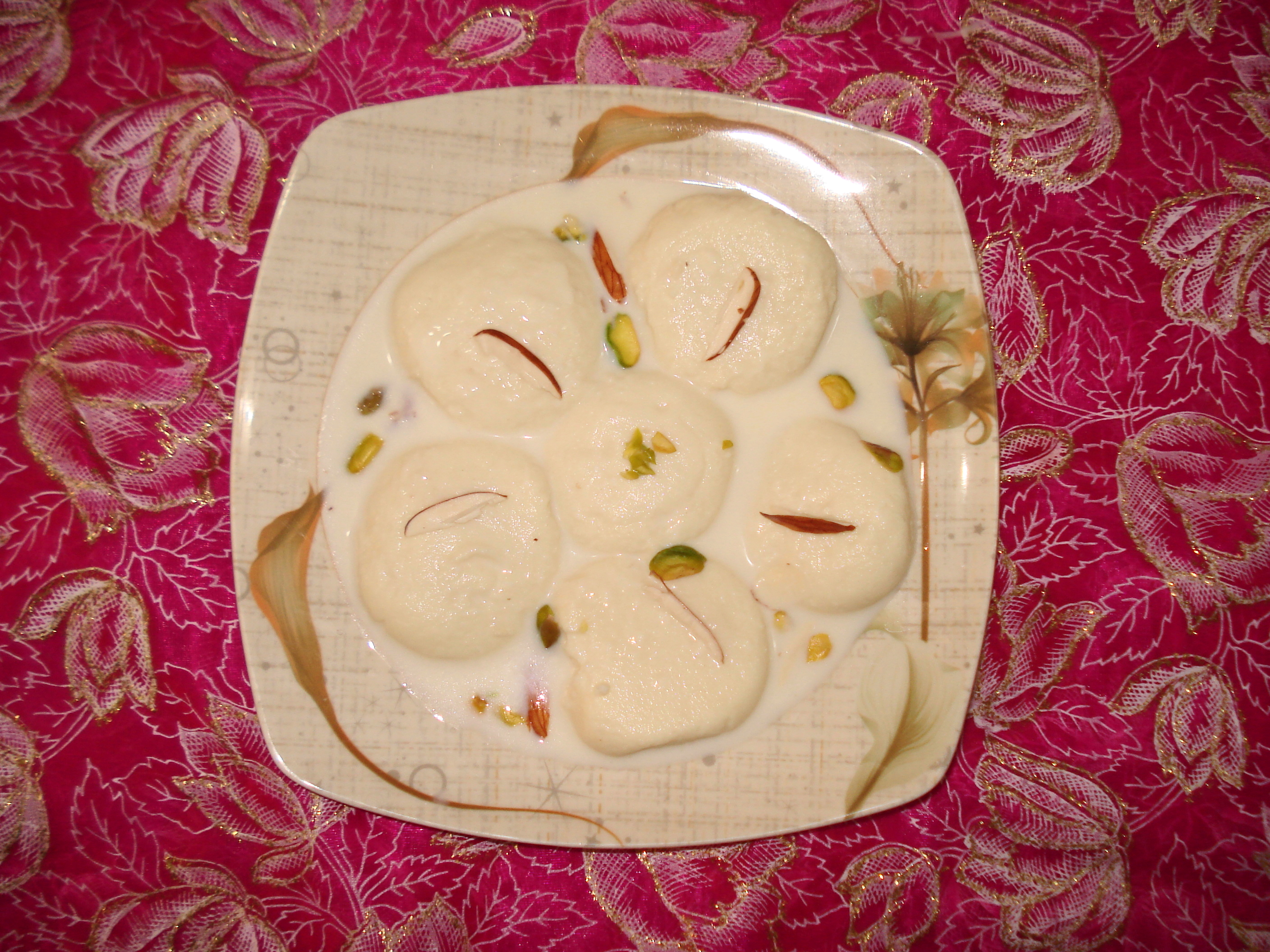
Ras malai

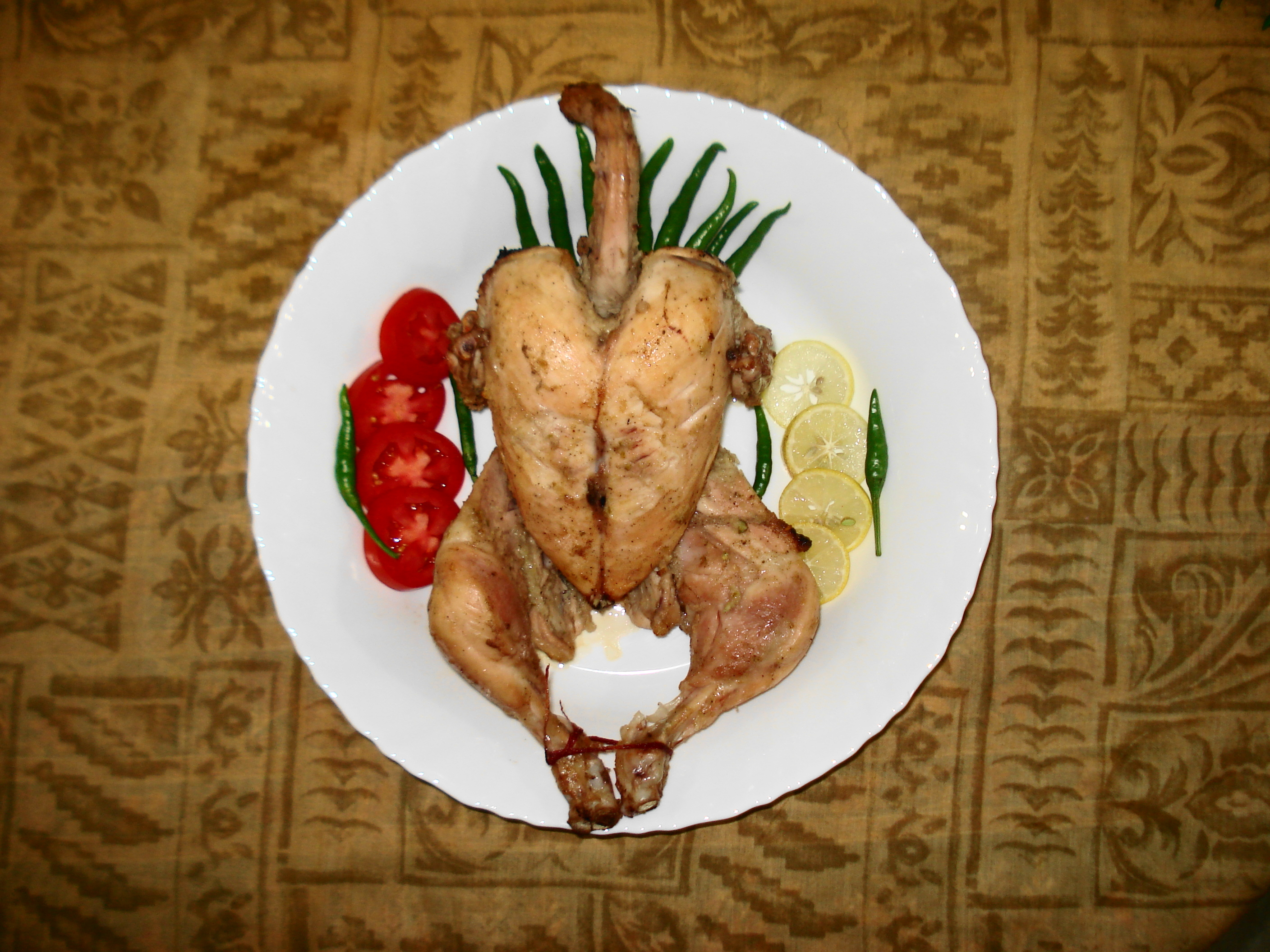
Sajji

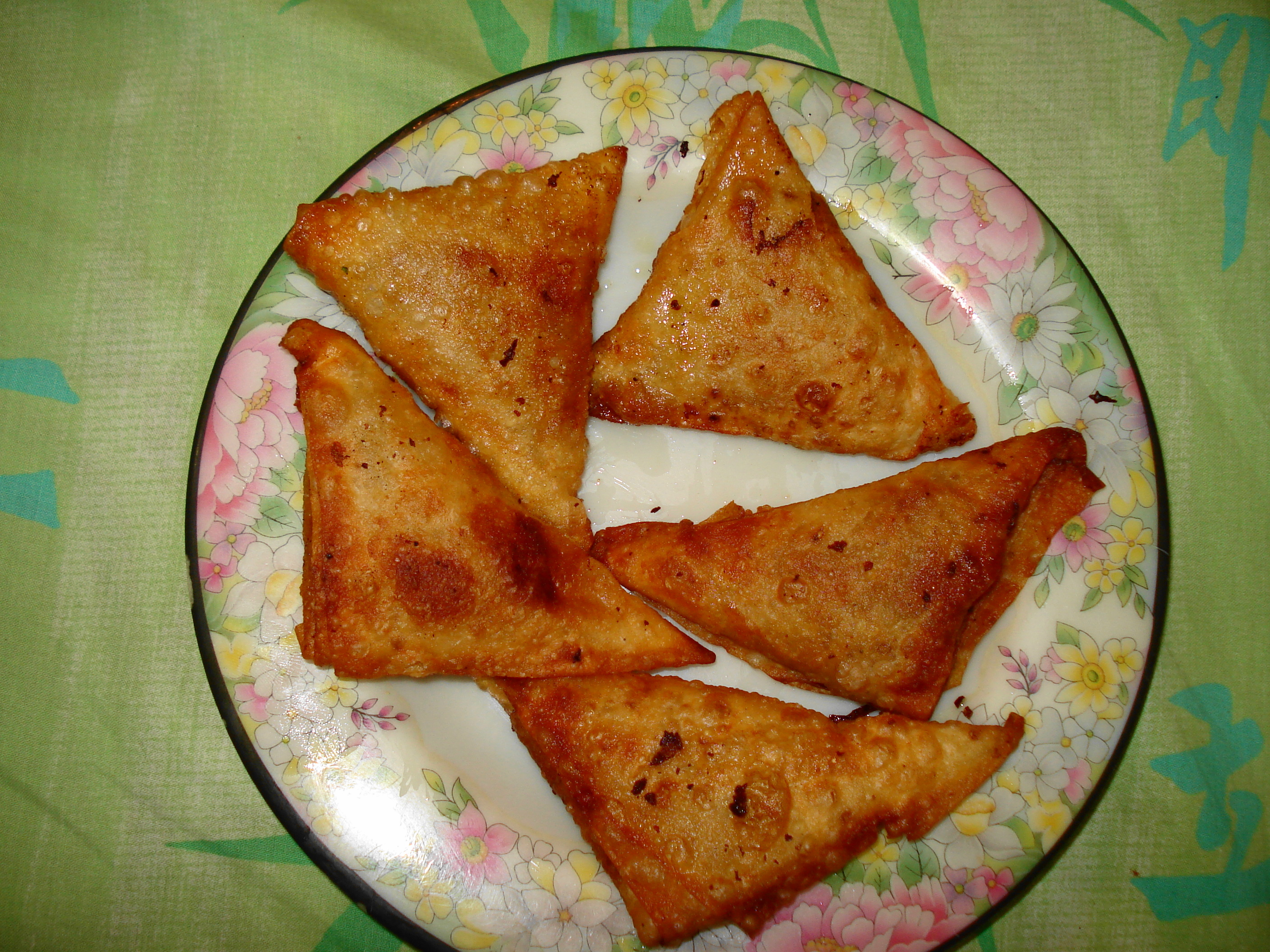
Samosa

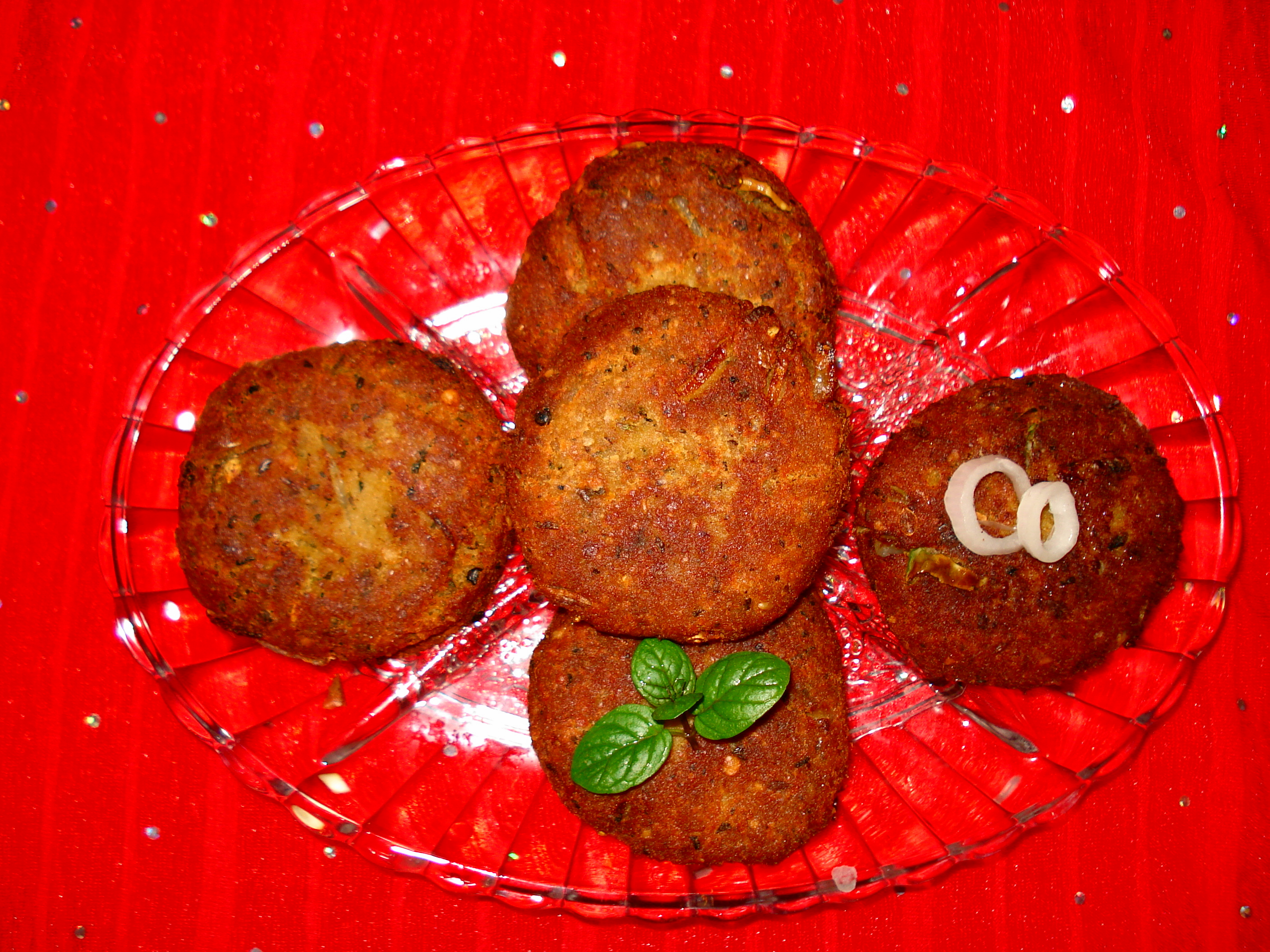
Shami kebab

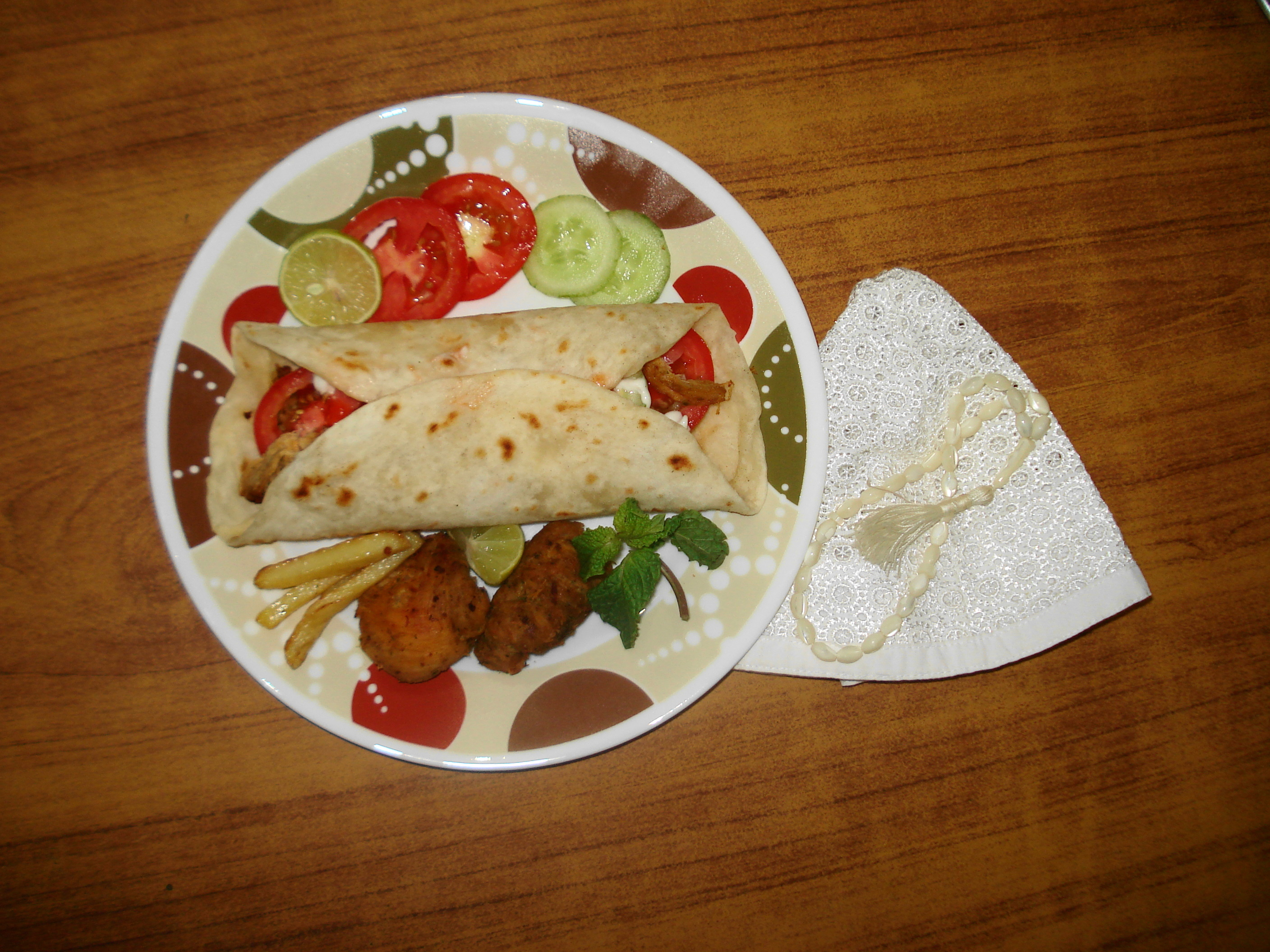
Shawarma

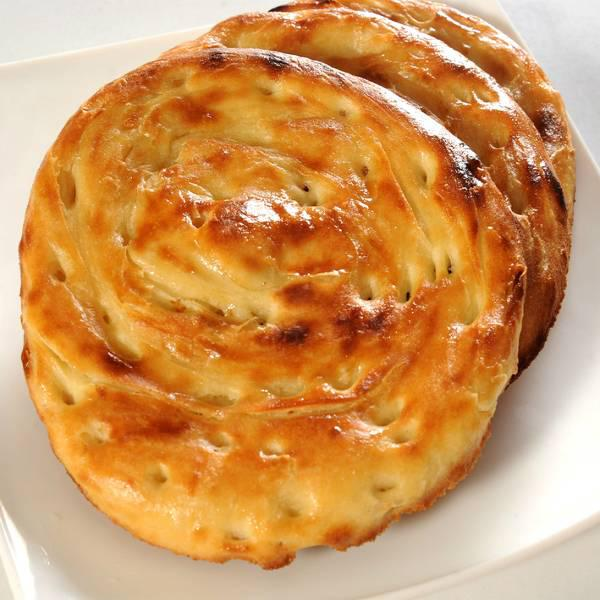
Sheermal

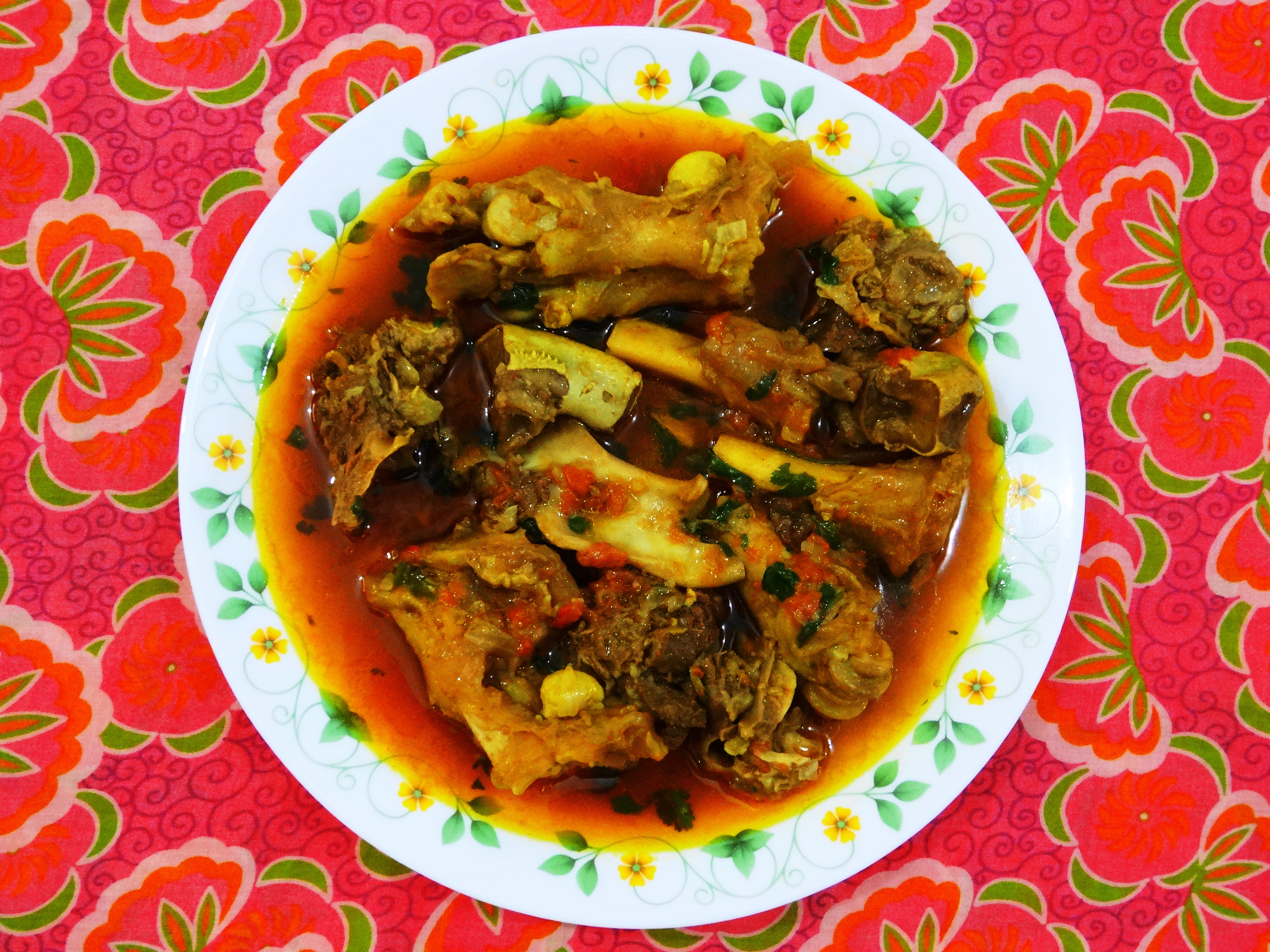
Siri paya

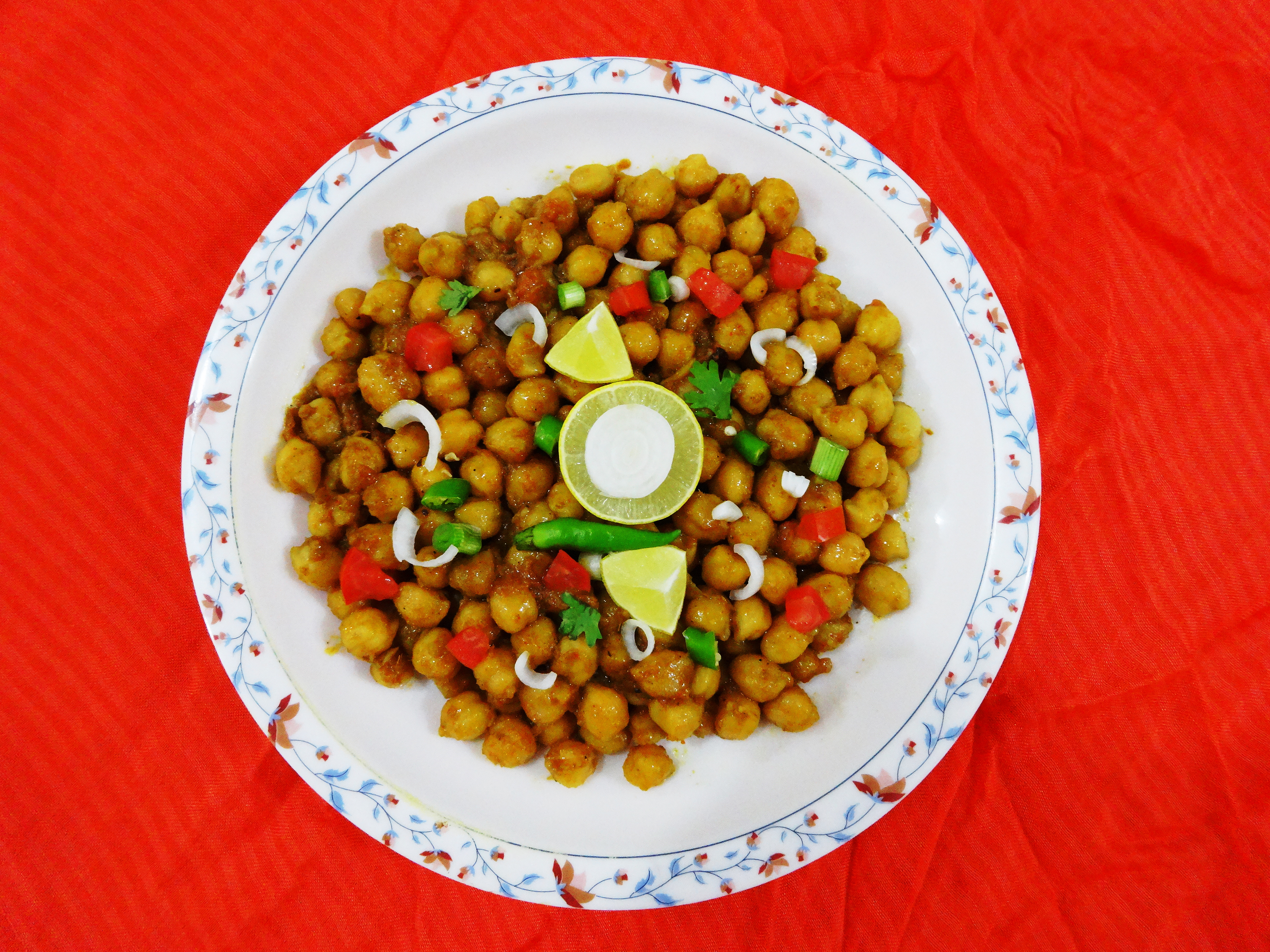
Chana Chaat / Cholay

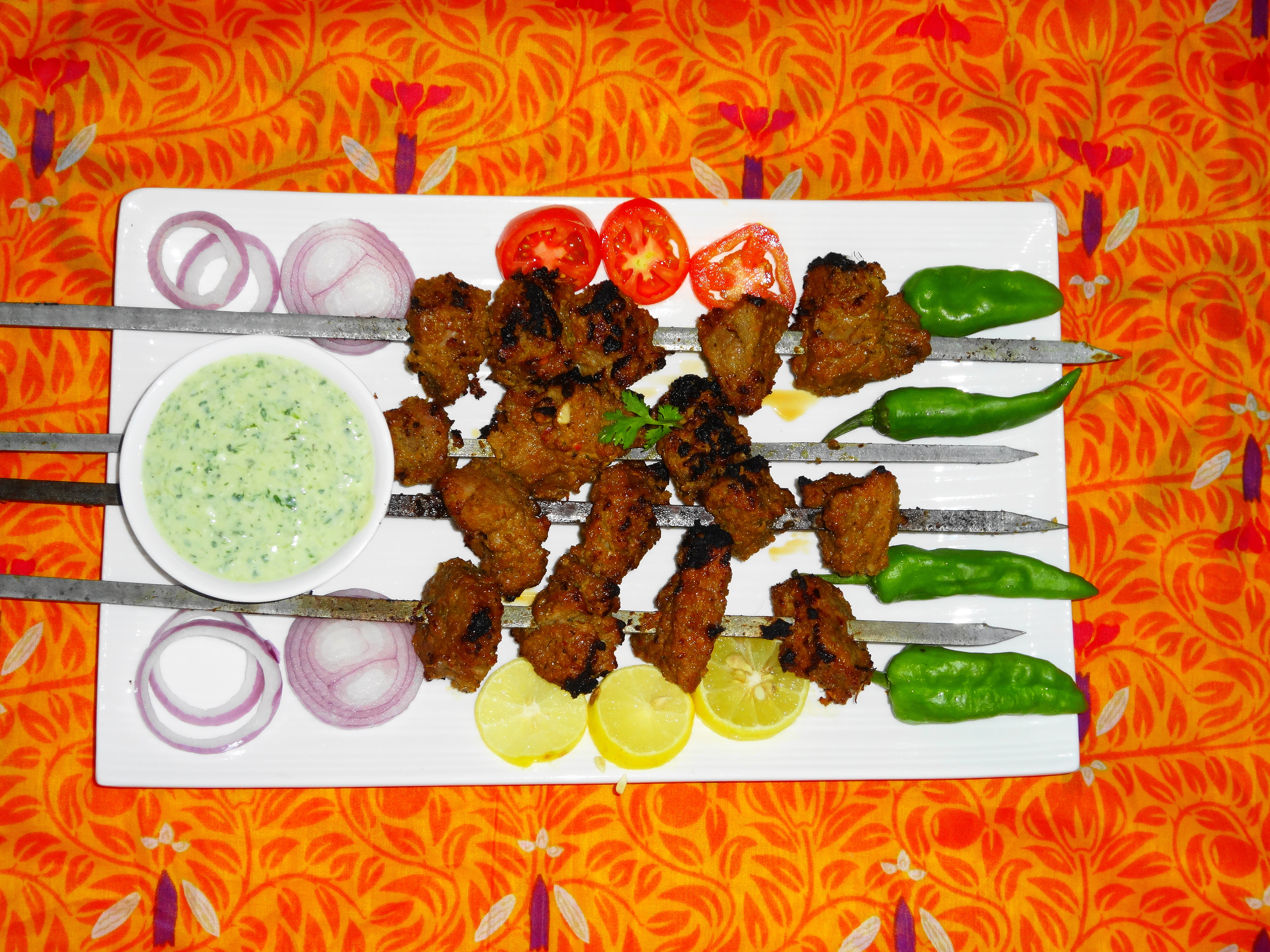
Bihari Kebab

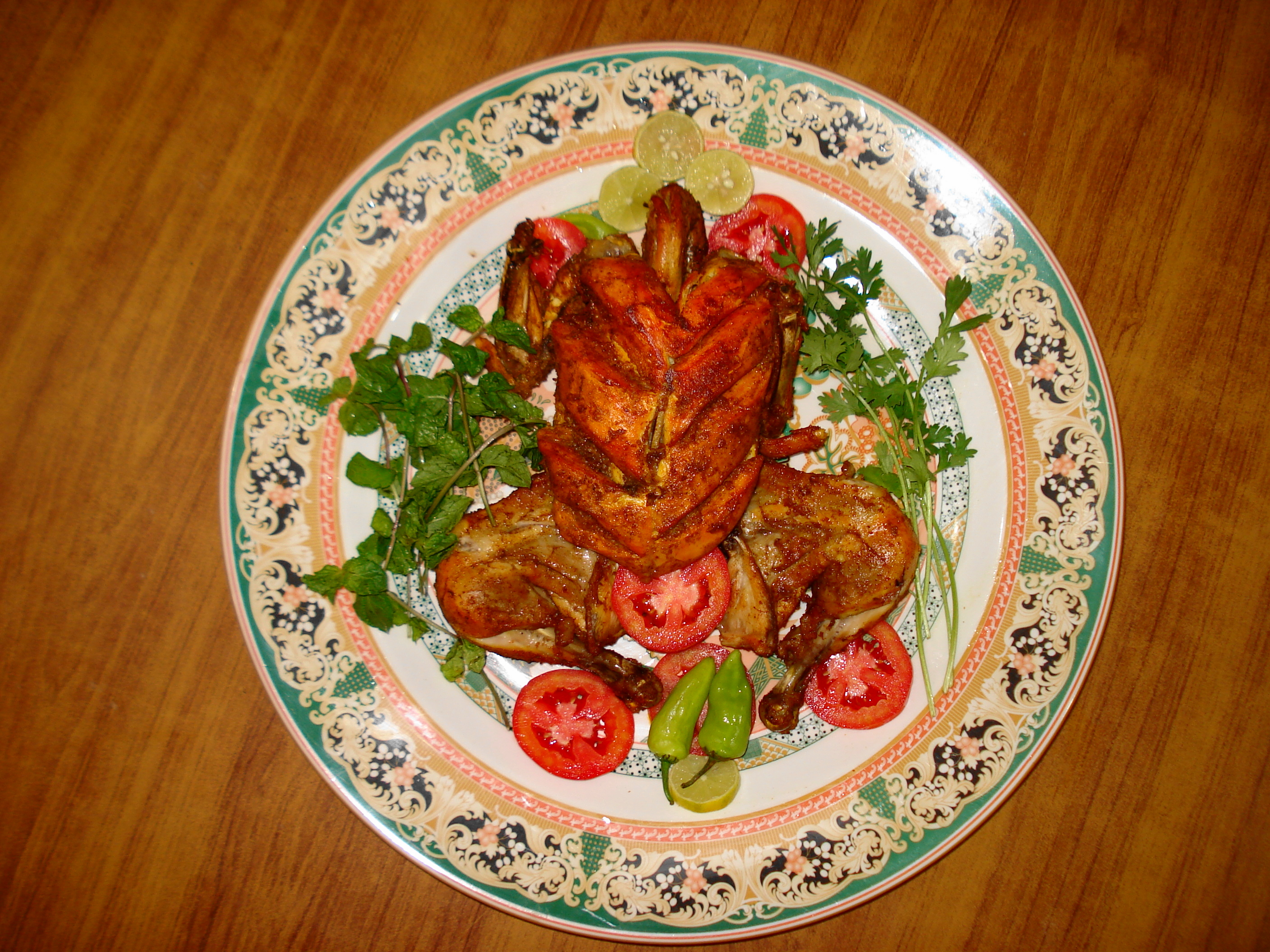
Chargah

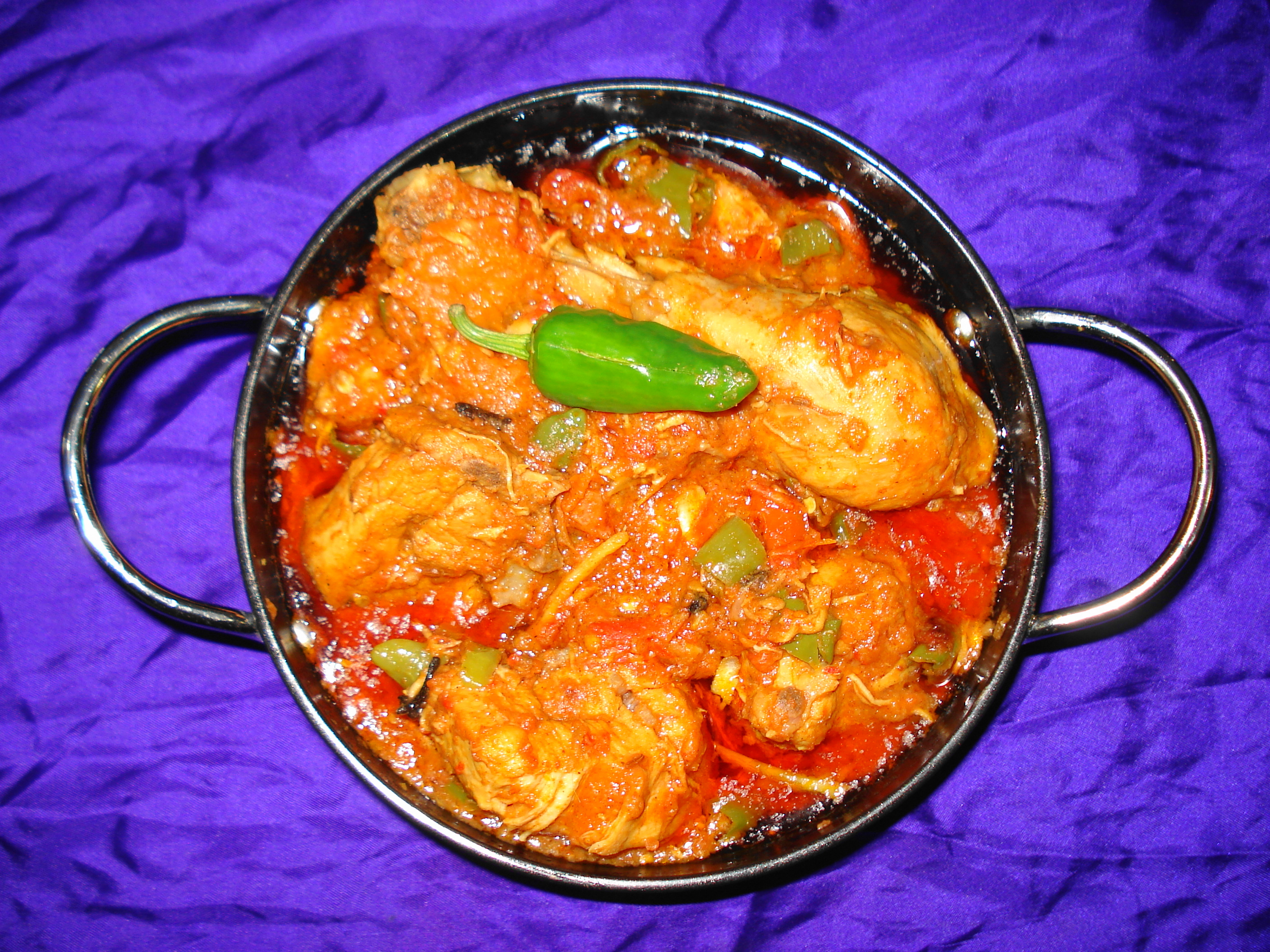
Chicken Karahi

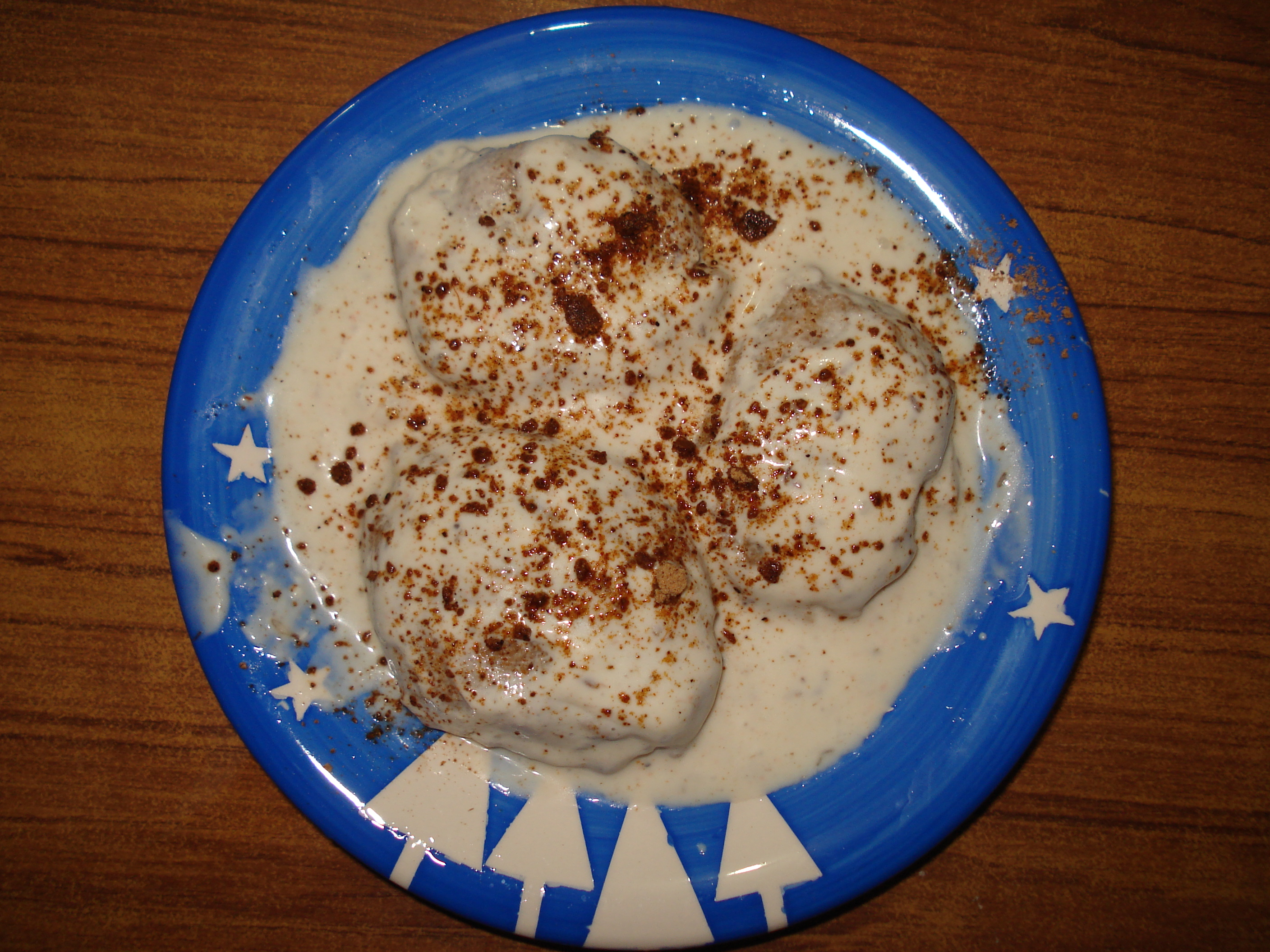
Dahi Baray

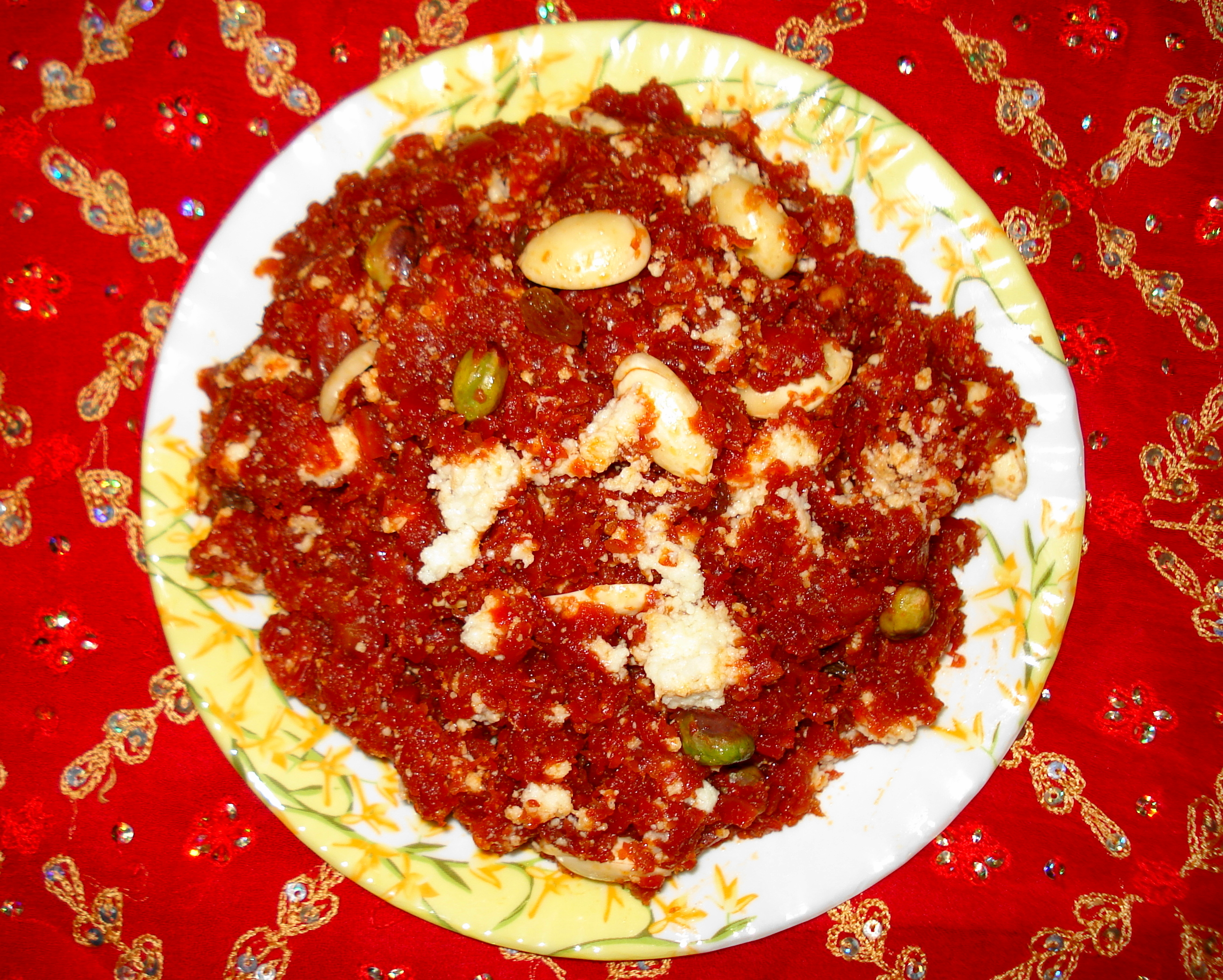
Gajer Ka Halwa

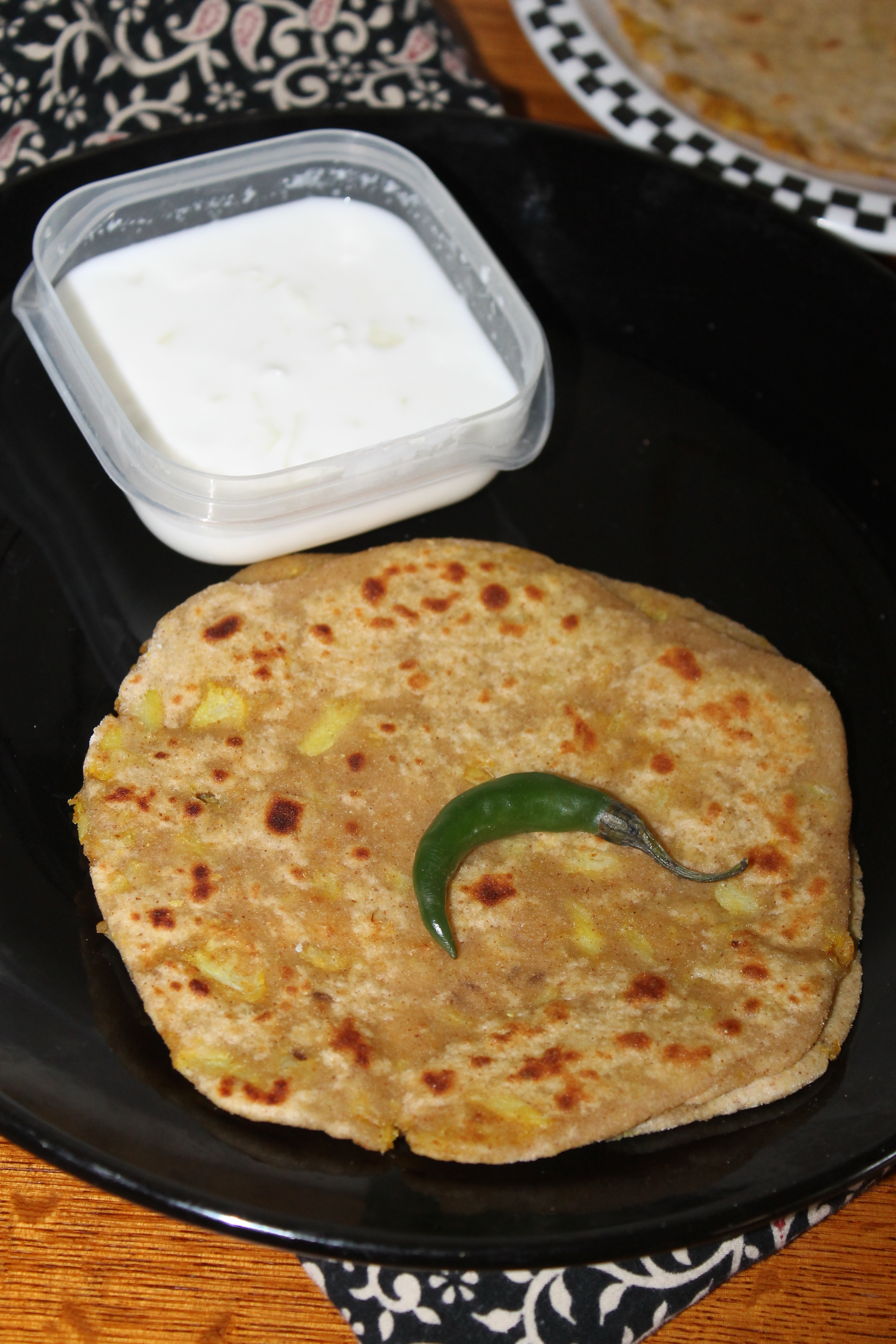
Gobhi Paratha with Yoghurt

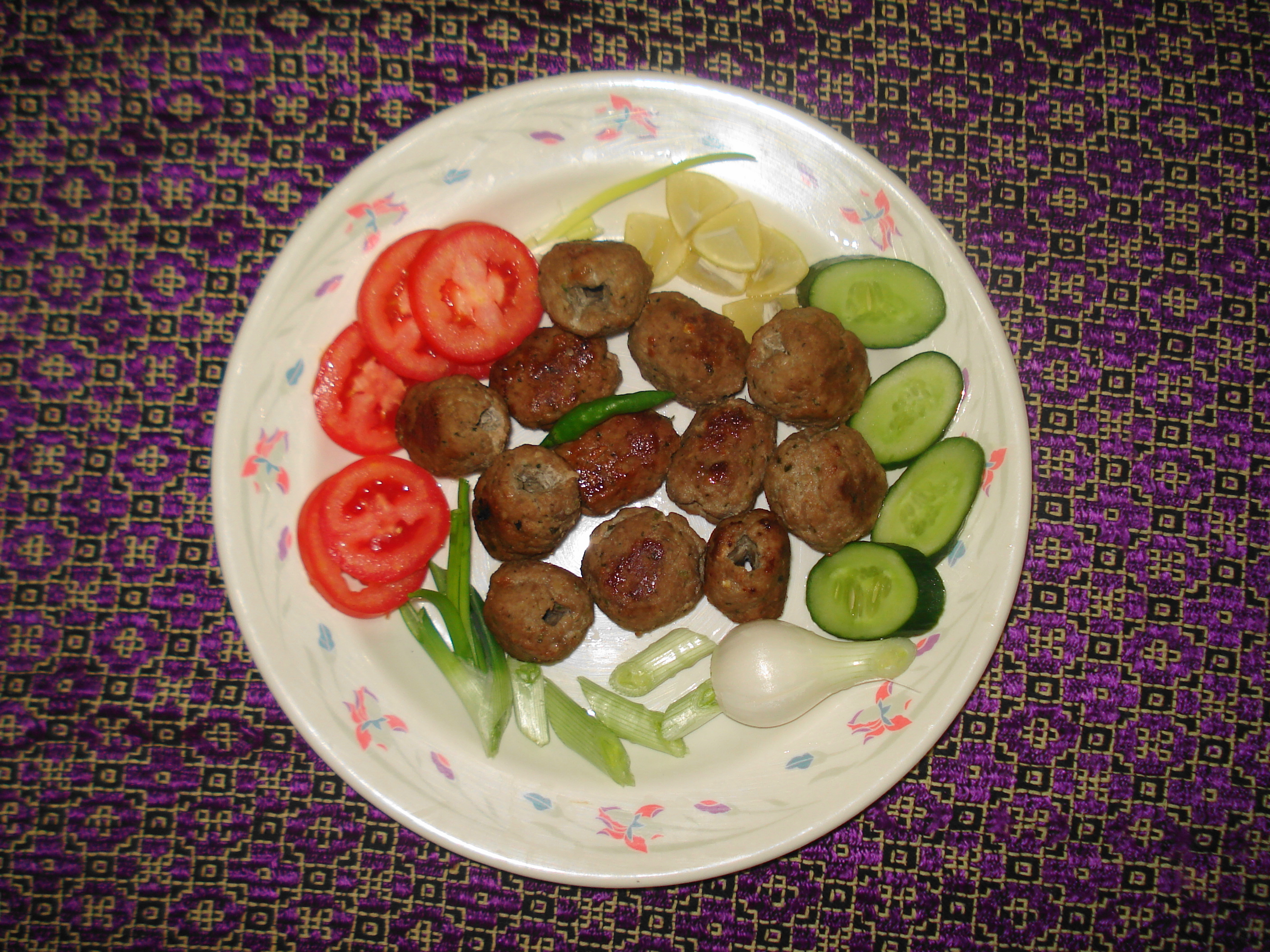
Gola Kebab

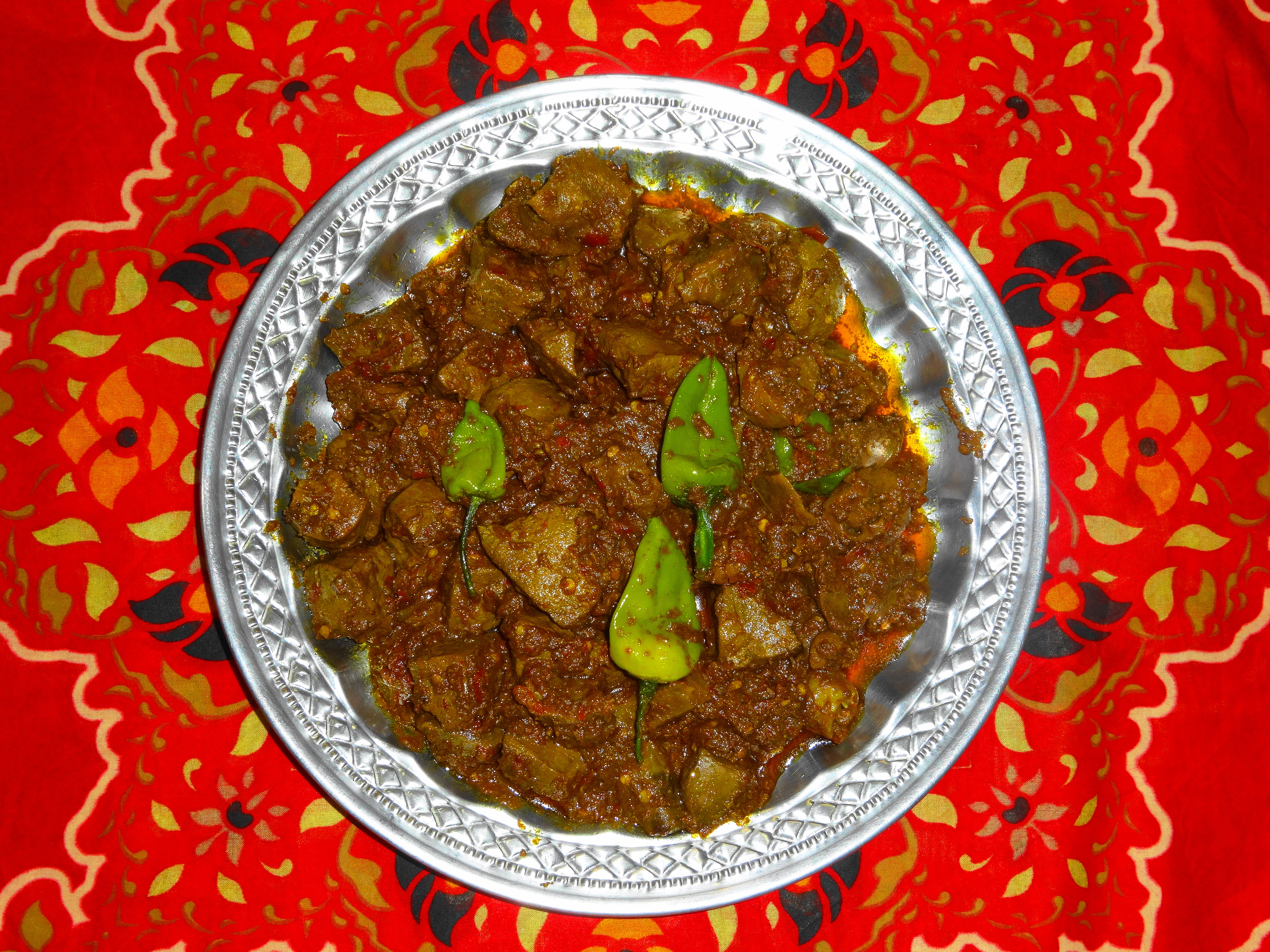
Kaleji (liver) Kabab

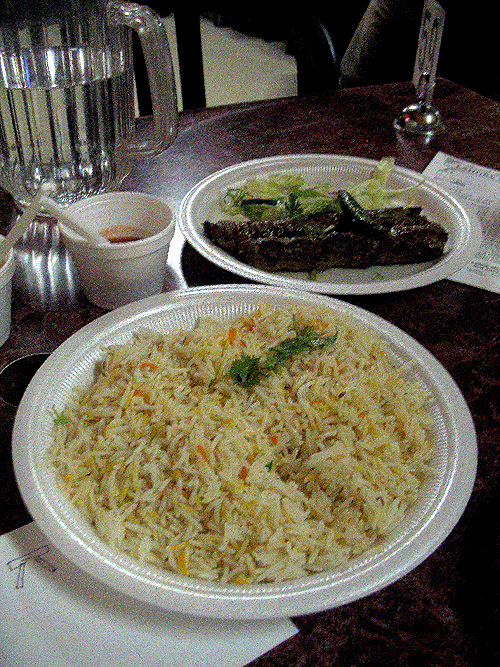
Lamb Tikka with Plain Rice

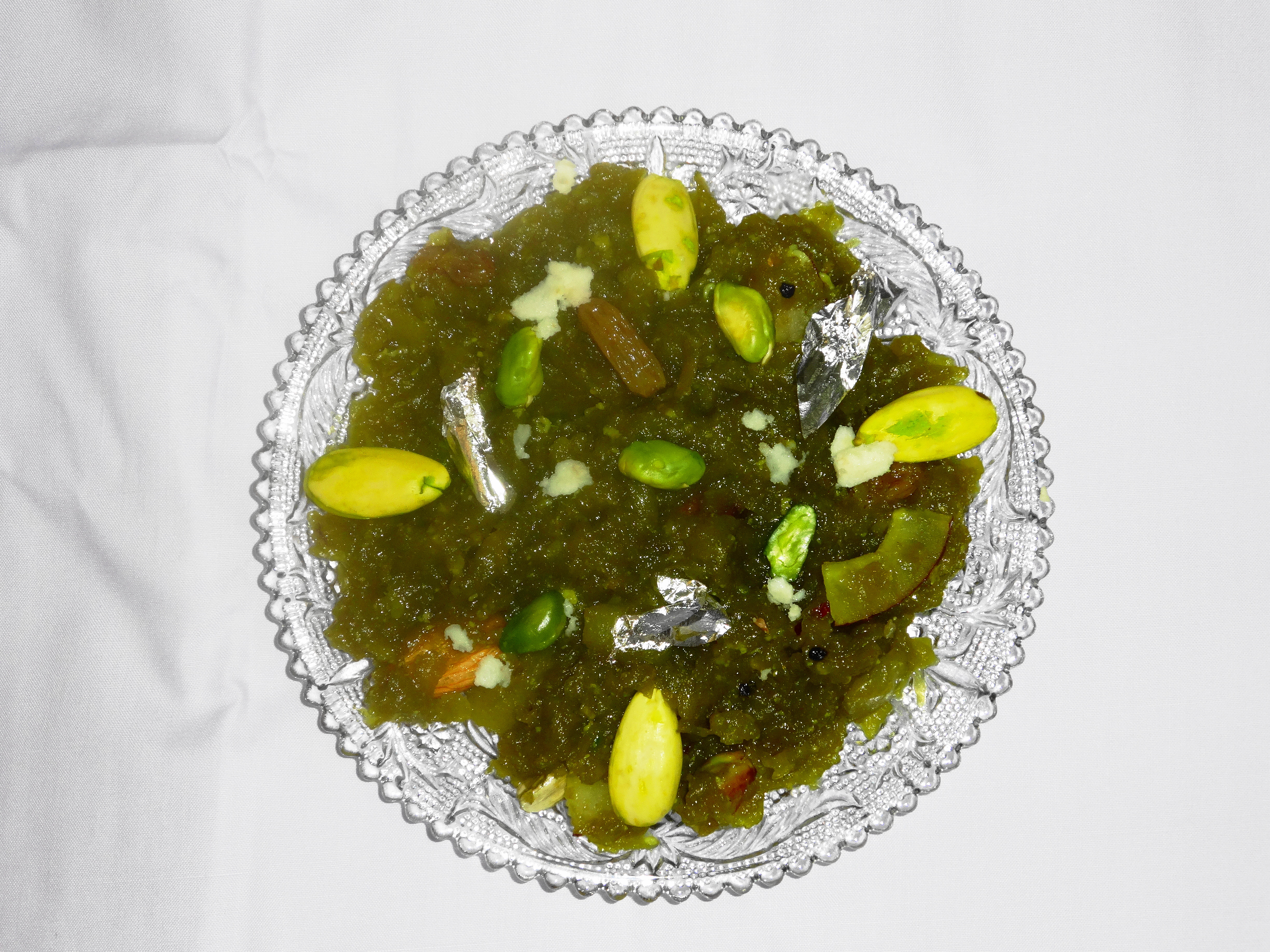
Lauki Ka Halwa

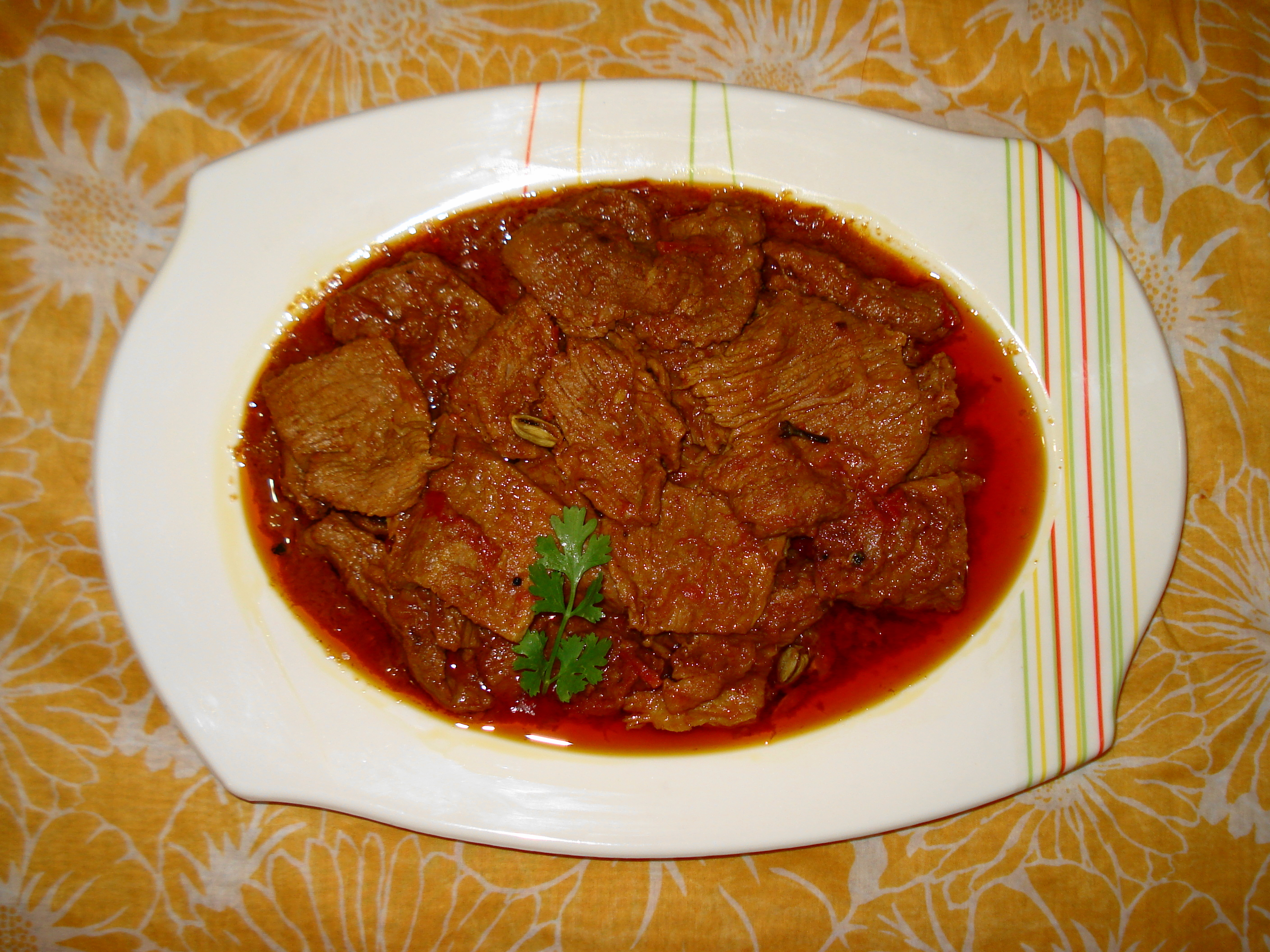
Pasanday

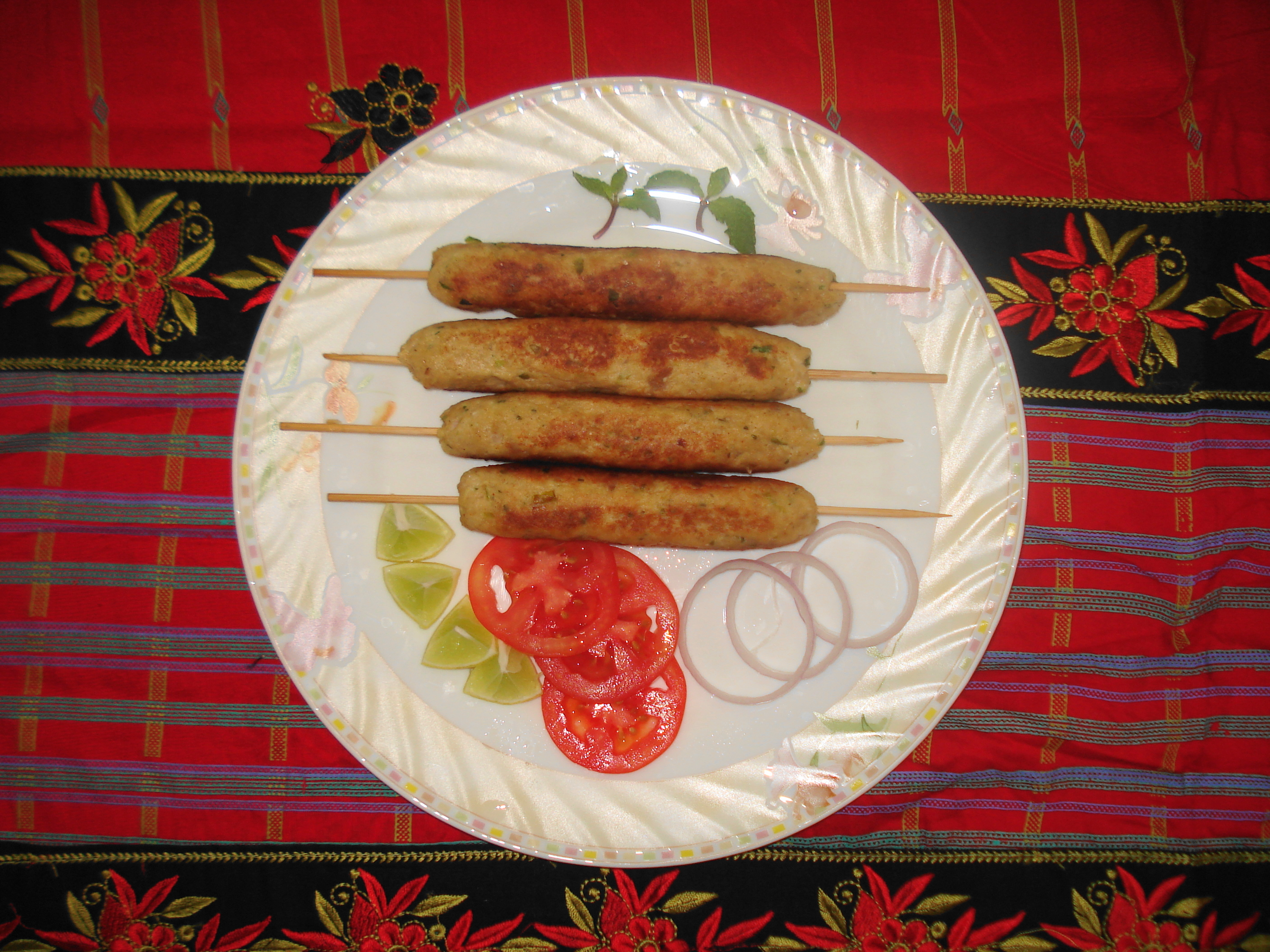
Reshmi Kebab

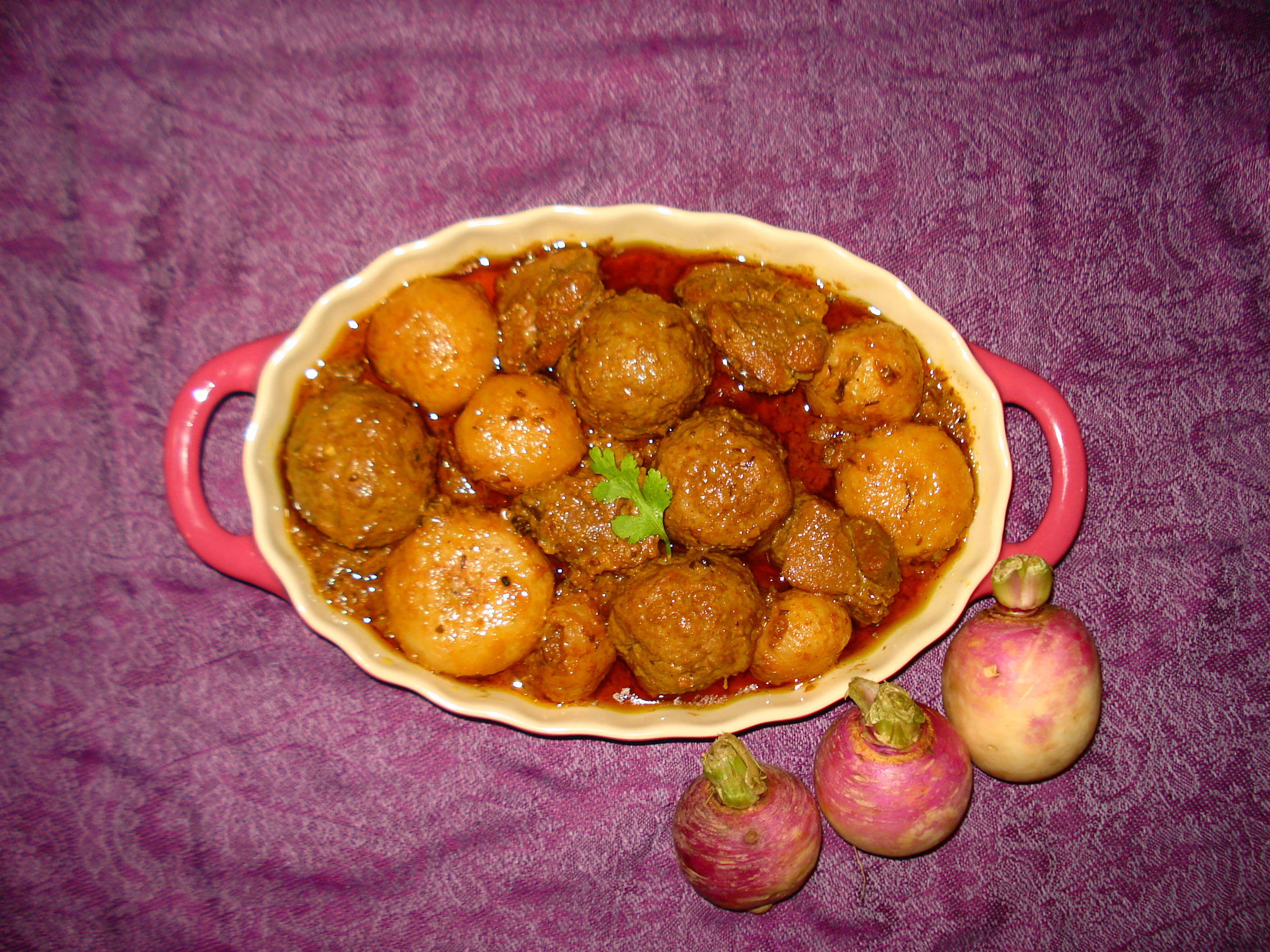
Shab Daig

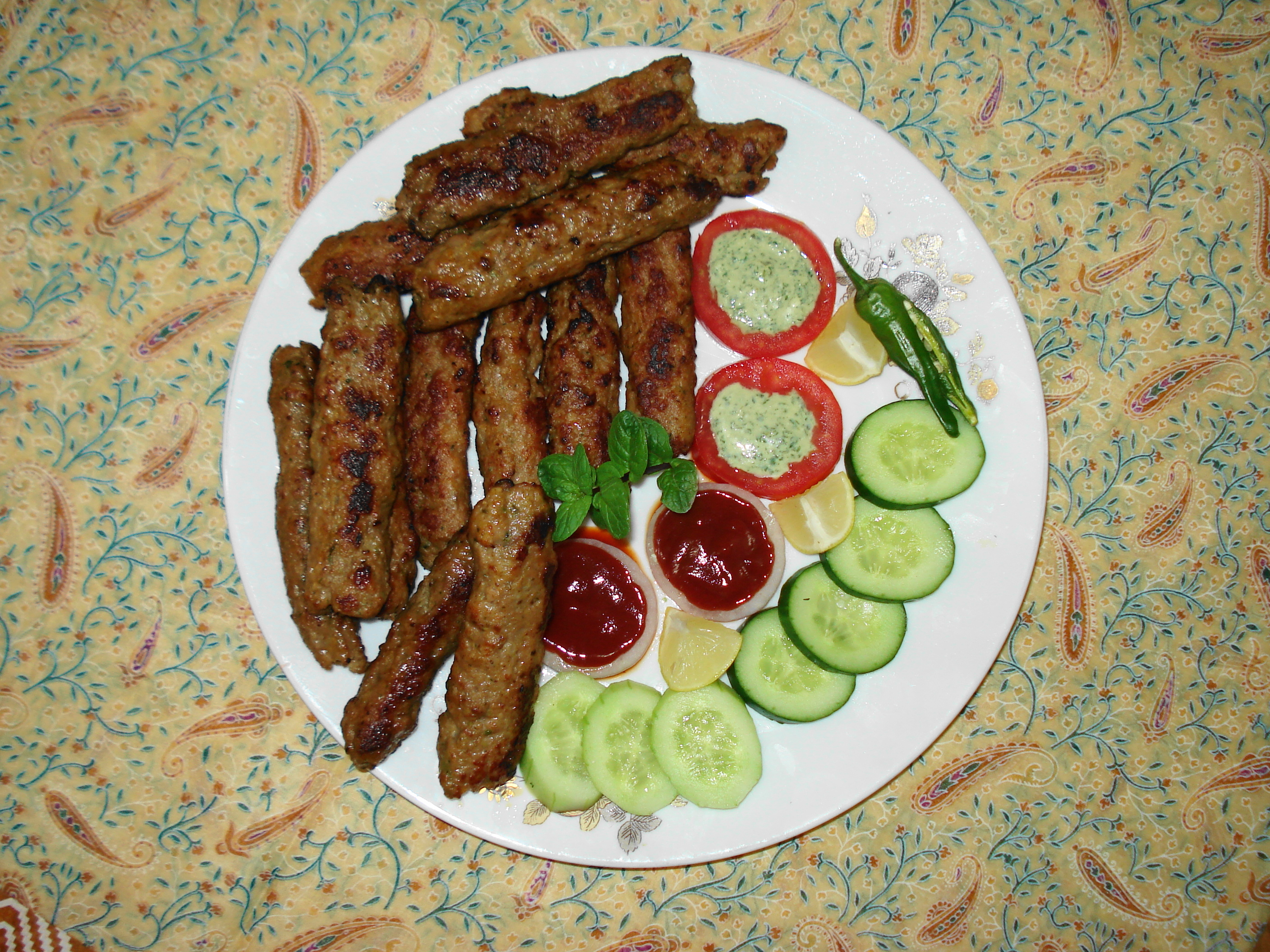
Seekh Kabab

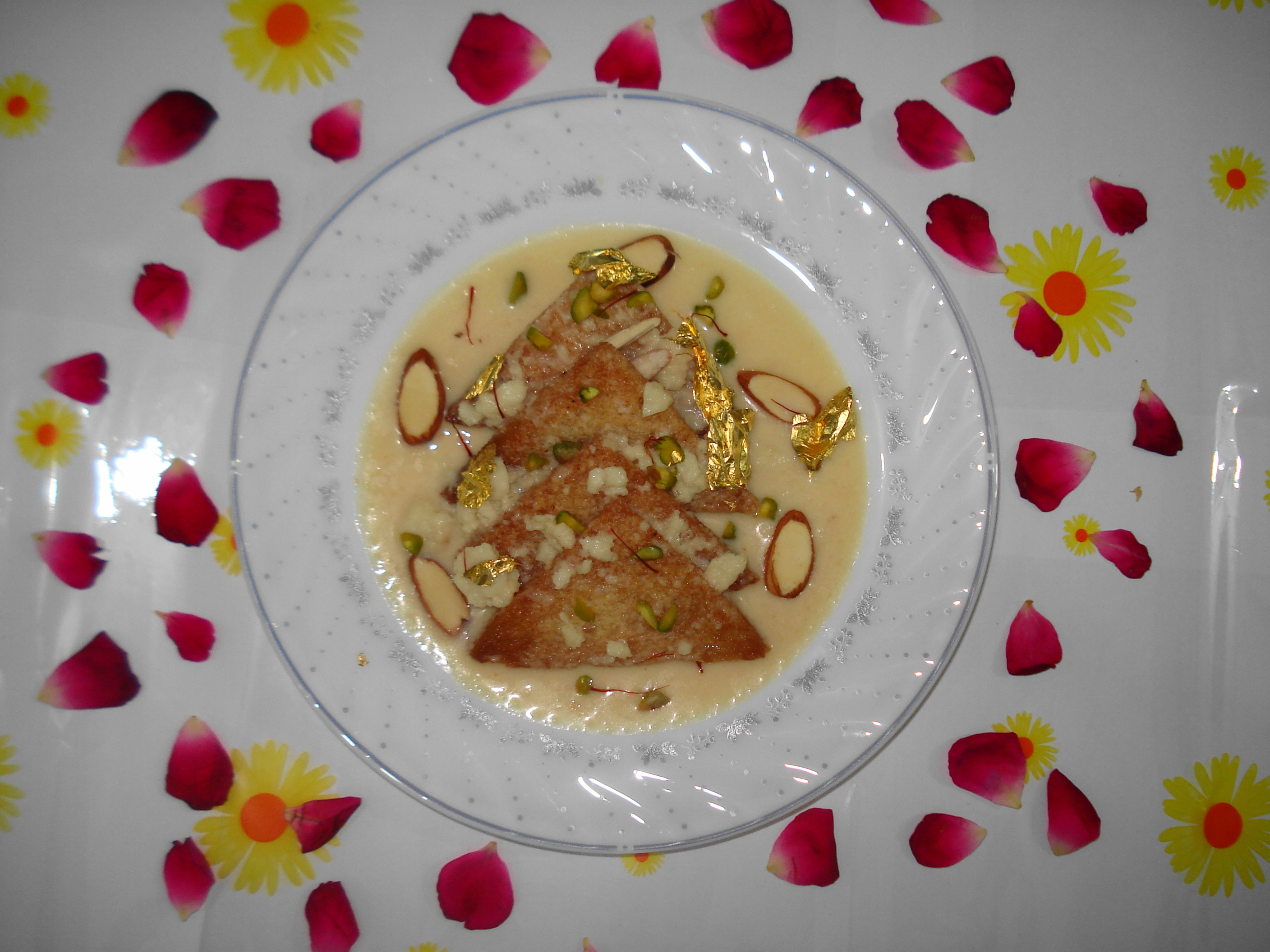
Shahi Tukray

== See also ==
- Pakistani cuisine
