= Roat =

Indian confectionery dish

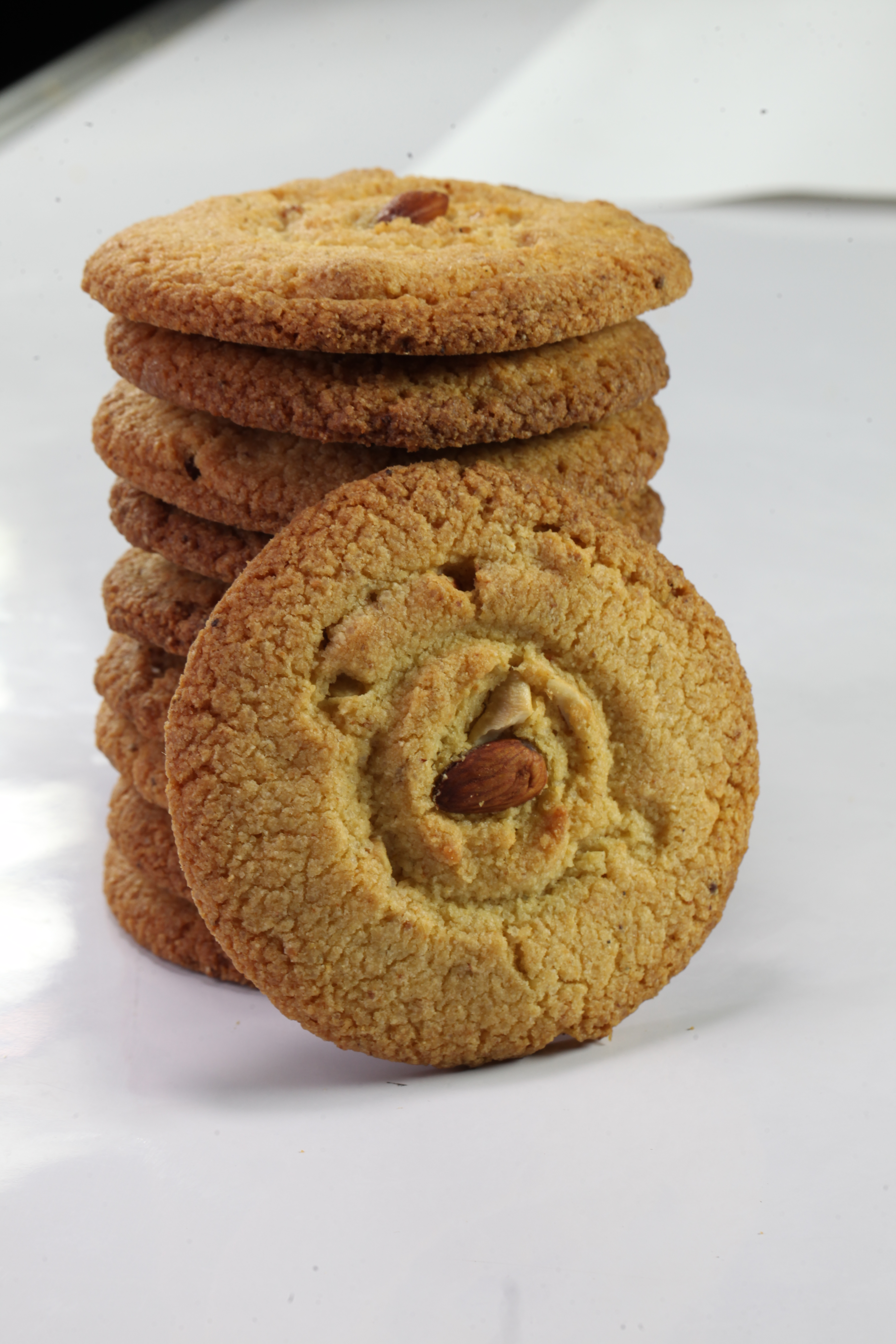
- Roat topped with almond and raisins
- Alternative names: Dum ke roat
- Type: Vegetarian
- Course: confectionery
- Place of origin: Hyderabad
- Associated cuisine: Hyderabadi cuisine
- Serving temperature: At room temperature
- Main ingredients: Semolina; maida (refined flour); ghee; khoa
- Ingredients generally used: Dry fruits; raisins; saffron; nutmeg

Roat also known colloquially as Dum ke Roat (Urdu: دم کے روٹ) is a sweet confectionery dish from Hyderabad. It is popular especially in the month of Muharram (the first month of the Islamic calendar) It is made by mixing semolina, refined flour, ghee, dry fruits, saffron and raisins into a dough and baking it in the oven.

== Etymology ==
Dum refers to being cooked with steam.

Roat refers to Roti (flatbread). Traditionally, women used to add sugar and extra ghee in the basic recipe of roti to make it tastier and it was used as an offering in Alam. However, as the recipe evolved over time, cooking rote on a stove became difficult. Due to this, it began to be baked instead.

== History ==
Roat has its origins from the Roti (flatbread) (see Etymology) It is said that during the ‘Nala-e-Mubarak’ Alam (an annual procession during Muharram in the Old City); the erstwhile Nizam of the Hyderabad; Mir Osman Ali Khan offered Roat for the safety and well-being of his grandson and heir apparent: Mukarram Jah. The practice has continued since. Roat is traditionally served after a majlis (gathering) in an Ashurakhana is completed.

Today they are made at homes or can be purchased from bakeries like Pista House, Karachi Bakery and Subhan Bakery.

== Ingredients ==
- All-purpose flour (maida)
- Semolina
- Ghee
- Khoa
- Warm milk
- Baking powder
- Cardamom
- Raisins
- Almonds
- Saffron
- Granulated sugar

== See also ==
- Hyderabadi cuisine
- Khubani-ka-Meetha
- Double ka meetha
- Osmania biscuit
