= Hyderabadi Zaiqa =

Halal Indian restaurant in New York City, USA

Coordinates: 40°45′52″N 73°59′15″W

Hyderabadi Zaiqa is a halal Indian restaurant in New York City founded featured in the MICHELIN Guide, best known for their authentic Hyderabadi dum biryani. The restaurant began its operations in Hell's Kitchen in August 2023 and then expanded to a larger full-service location in Curry Hill in January 2025. The two locations in New York City are on Lexington Avenue in Murray Hill and the other on West 52nd Street in Hell's Kitchen.

== History ==
Hyderabadi Zaiqa was founded with the mission to bring Hyderabadi halal food to New York City. The restaurant aims to share the unique spicy flavors of Hyderabad, located in South India, offering a menu that reflects regional variety ranging from Hyderabadi specialties to dishes influenced by North Indian masalas and Indo-Chinese cuisines. The founders describe their approach as providing authentic South Asian dishes to a wider audience in an accessible, affordable, and fast casual setting. The restaurant began its operations in a tiny three-table space in Hells Kitchen however, it has since expanded to a larger full service location in Curry Hill.

== Chefs and founders ==
Chef Mohammad Tarique Khan was raised in Rourkela, Odisha and leads the kitchen at Hyderabadi Zaiqa. In a W42ST interview, he mentions he grew up in a Muslim family in India and learned to cook biryani, a Hyderabadi Zaiqa specialty, from recipes developed by his mother and grandmothers. His culinary education and techniques draw influence from the cuisines of Pakistan, Bangladesh, and Persia. He founded the restaurant with his business partner Jayesh Naik. Khan's upbringing and culinary vision are directly drawn from his Indian Muslim heritage and his experience cooking across India prior to him settling in New York. His business partner, Mr. Naik, brings in additional hospitality experience and extensive training in diverse regional cuisines across India, allowing for a collaboration of culinary skills and business vision that has shaped the restaurant's success and influence in the New York City community.

== Cuisine ==
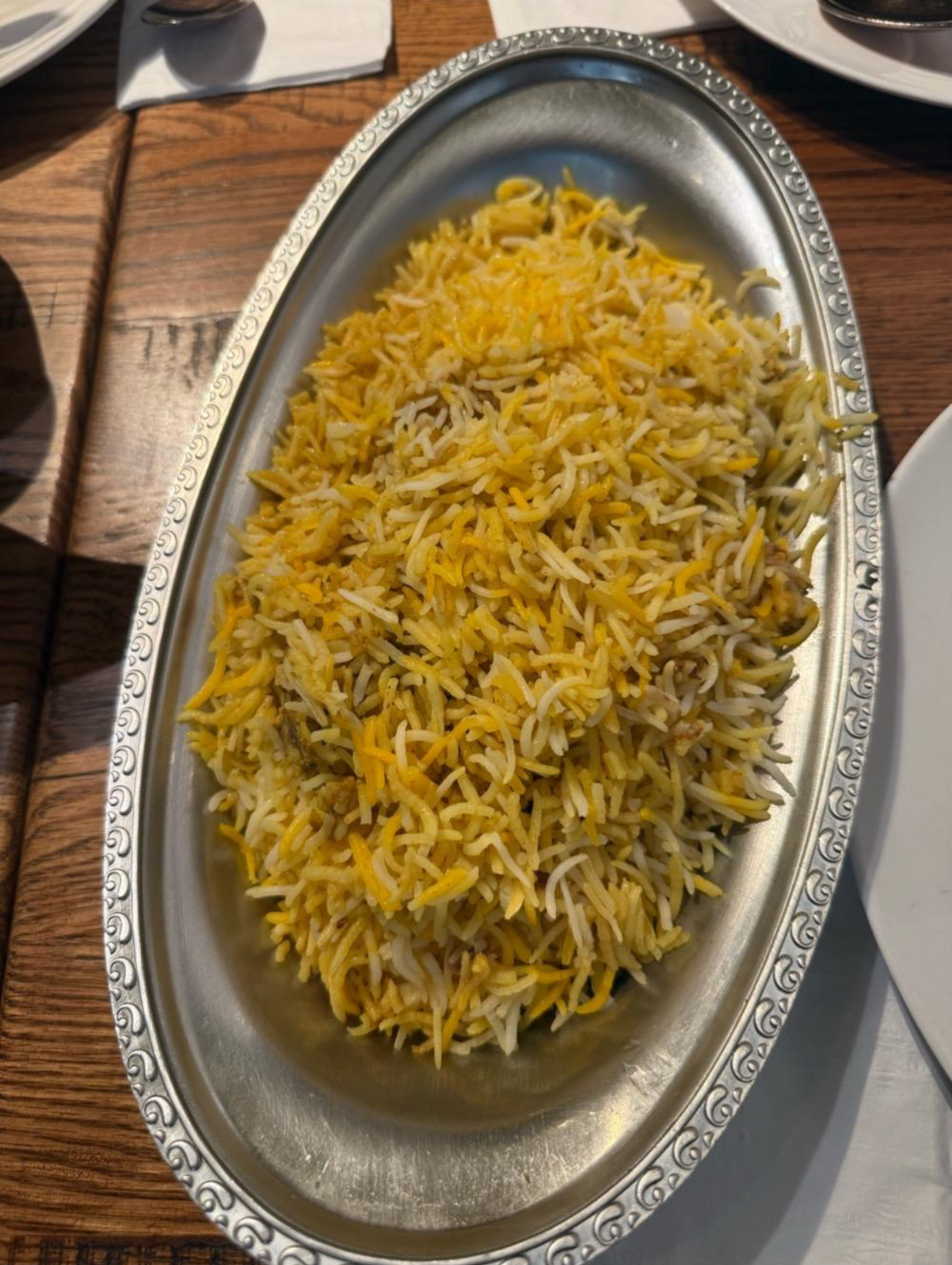
Chicken Dum Biryani from Hyderabadi Zaiqa

Hyderabadi Zaiqa is known for its Hyderabadi biryani, haleem, and other regional dishes that aim to highlight the diversity within Indian cuisine. The Infatuation's review notes that the restaurant focuses on flavorful, comforting dishes offered at an accessible price point. The extensively diverse menu features 15 different biryani options covering vegetarian and meat options of goat, lamb, chicken, fish, and shrimp. The special Hyderabadi biryani is the dum biryani, which is a cooking technique using a lidded pan that originated in Persia and seals the flavor as the rice cooks.

== Reception ==
The restaurant has received extensive attention from independent reviewers and public figures. The Infatuation highlights its strong customer following, while India West documented a visit from U.S. Senator Bernie Sanders and New York Mayoral elect Zohran Mamdani, which brought attention to the restaurant within the South Asian and political communities. Hyderabadi Zaiqa's inclusion in the MICHELIN Guide and its 2023 Eater Award of "Best $20 Spent" further confirms its notability and reputation for high-quality halal Indian dining in New York City.
