= Salan (disambiguation) =

Salan was a 9th-century Bulgarian duke who ruled in the territory of present-day Vojvodina, Serbia.

Salan may also refer to:

- Raoul Salan (1899–1984), general who led the 1961 putsch against the French government in Algeria
- a term for curry in Hindi and Urdu and other South Asian languages, e.g. Mirchi ka salan.
