= Tala huwa gosht =

Hyderabadi meat dish

Talawa Gosht
- Alternative names: Tala huwa Gosht
- Course: Main
- Place of origin: India
- Region or state: Hyderabad
- Serving temperature: Hot
- Main ingredients: Beef, lamb

Talawa gosht (lit. 'fried meat') is a Hyderabadi dish. It is a very simple meat preparation with lamb or beef and basic flavorings originating from Hyderabad, India. It is usually prepared with Mithi Dal or Khatti Dal, and is eaten with rice.

The proper Urdu name is Talaa-wa-Gosh. It is shortened to Talawa Gosht in the Hyderabadi Urdu dialect.
