= Travancore biriyani =

Rice and meat dish from Kerala

Travancore biriyani, also known as Trivandrum biriyani (Malayalam pronunciation: [t̪iɾuʋəndɾəm biɾijɑːni]), is a style of biriyani originating from Travancore, the erstwhile princely state corresponding to present-day Trivandrum. Made with long fragrant basmati or jeerakasala rice and meat (most commonly mutton, chicken, beef, or fish), the dish blends local Trivandrum culinary traditions. Travancore biriyani is known for its spicing, aromatic herbs, and richness from ghee or coconut oil.

== History ==
Travancore biryani evolved over time as culinary traditions spread through the region, incorporating local elements like shallots, coconut, fennel, and coconut oil.

Some claim that the dish "oonchoru", as mentioned in Sangam literature, which dates from between 200 BCE and 200 CE, is a predecessor of modern biryani. This dish, which was served to the soldiers of the Chera kings in Kerala, was said to be made of rice, ghee, meat, turmeric, coriander, pepper, and bay leaf.

== Signature style ==
A typical Trivandrum biryani is golden yellow in color, made with long-grained fragrant rice that is lightly spiced with whole spices such as cloves, cinnamon, bay leaves, ginger, and garlic. The dish contains pieces of tender meat (mutton, chicken, beef, or fish) layered with the rice. It is garnished with fried cashew nuts, raisins, fresh coriander, and mint leaves. A boiled egg is traditionally placed at the center of the biryani, a hallmark of the Travancore style. The biryani is typically served with a mild raita made from finely sliced onion, tomato, and green chili, coconut chutney, lime or date pickle, and generous helpings of crispy pappadam. The use of ghee or coconut oil adds a rich aroma and depth of flavor.

== Ingredients and preparation ==
Key ingredients include:

- Rice: Basmati or Jeerakasala (kaima) rice
- Protein: Mutton, chicken, beef, or fish; vegetarian variants use jackfruit or mushroom
- Spices: Cloves, cinnamon, cardamom, bay leaves, fennel seeds, and star anise
- Aromatics: Shallots (preferred over onions), garlic, ginger, green chili
- Fats: Ghee or coconut oil
- Herbs: Coriander and mint leaves
- Garnish: Fried cashew nuts, raisins, boiled egg

The meat is marinated in yogurt and spices, then slow-cooked until tender. The rice is cooked separately with whole spices and then layered with the meat mixture. The assembled biryani is then cooked in the dum style—sealed and steamed—sometimes wrapped in banana leaves for additional aroma

== Unique characteristics ==
- Mild and aromatic
- Preferential use of shallots instead of onions
- Often cooked in coconut oil, especially in southern Kerala households
- Includes a boiled egg as a defining element
- Served with raita, coconut chutney, pickles, and pappadam

== See also ==
- Hyderabadi biryani
- Kerala cuisine
