= Hyderabadi biryani =

Variant of biryani

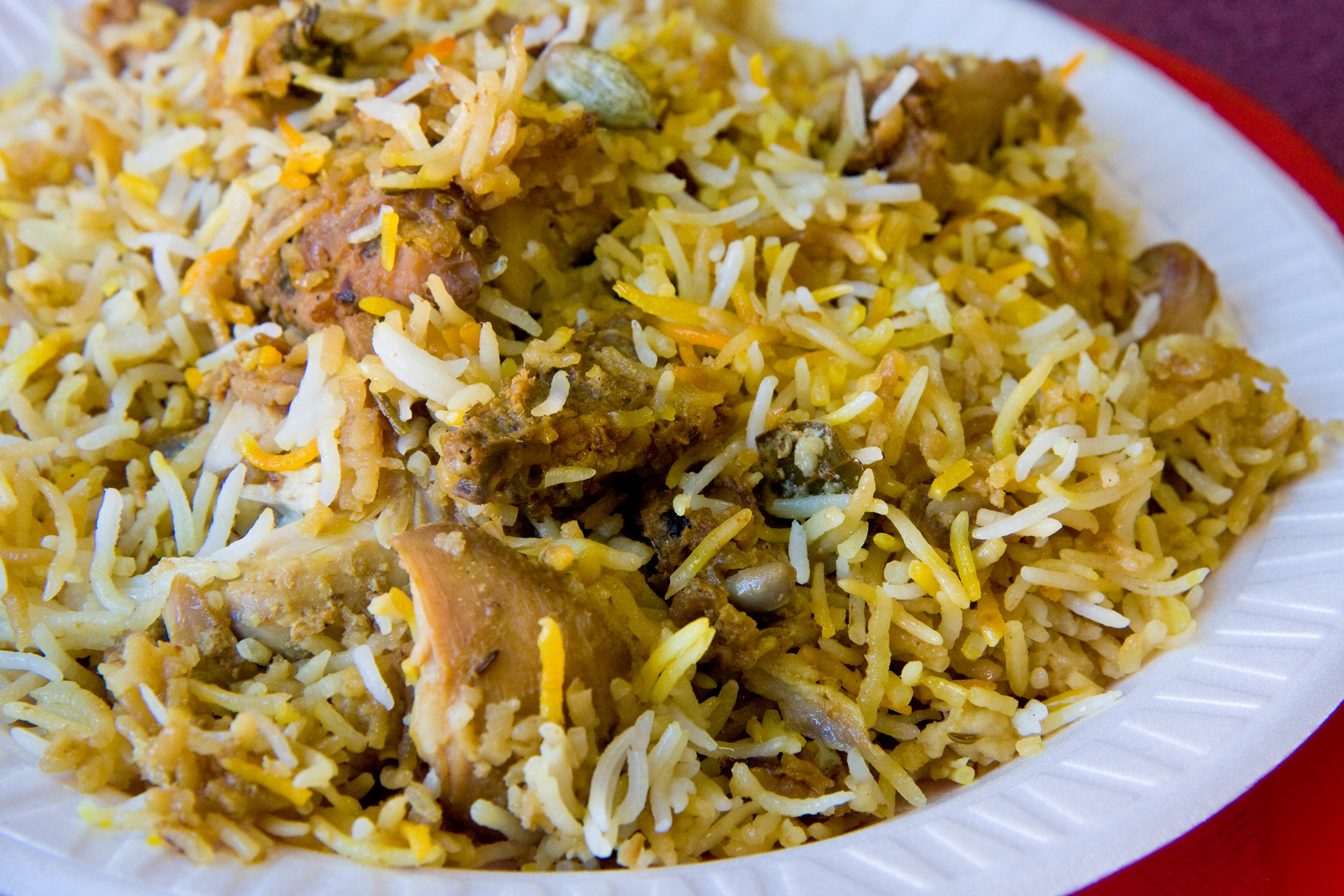
- Hyderabadi biryani
- Place of origin: India
- Region or state: Hyderabad
- Main ingredients: Basmati rice; Goat meat; Beef; Chicken; Vegetables; Spices

Hyderabadi biryani (also known as Hyderabadi dum biryani) is a style of biryani originating from Hyderabad, India made with basmati rice and meat (mostly goat meat). Originating in the kitchens of the Nizam of Hyderabad, it combines elements of Hyderabadi and Mughlai cuisines. Hyderabad biryani is a key dish in Hyderabadi cuisine and it is so famous that the dish is considered synonymous with the city of Hyderabad.

== History ==
Hyderabad was conquered by the Mughals in the 1630s, and ruled by its Nizams. Mughlai culinary traditions joined with local traditions to create Hyderabadi cuisine. Local folklore attributes the creation of Hyderabadi biryani to the chef of the first Nizam, Nizam-ul-Mulk, Asaf Jah I, in the mid-18th century, during a hunting expedition. In 1857, when the Mughal Empire declined in Delhi, Hyderabad emerged as the center of South Asian culture, resulting in a mix of innovations in Hyderabadi biryani.

=== Origin ===
The exact origin of the dish is uncertain. Despite legends attributing it to the Nizam's chef, the biryani is of Iranian origin, derived from pilaf varieties brought to South Asia by Arab traders. Pulao may have been an army dish in medieval India. Armies would prepare a one-pot dish of rice with whichever meat was available. The distinction between "pulao" and "biryani" is arbitrary. Hyderabadi biryani incorporated Deccani or Telangana flavors of, perhaps in the Nizam's kitchen.

== Ingredients ==
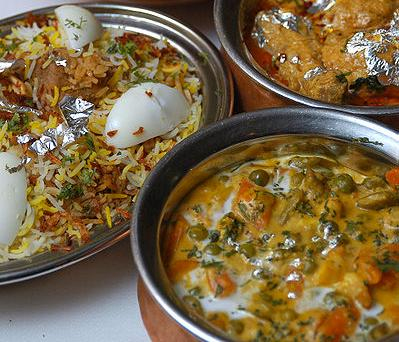
Hyderabadi biryani (on the left) served with other Indian dishes.

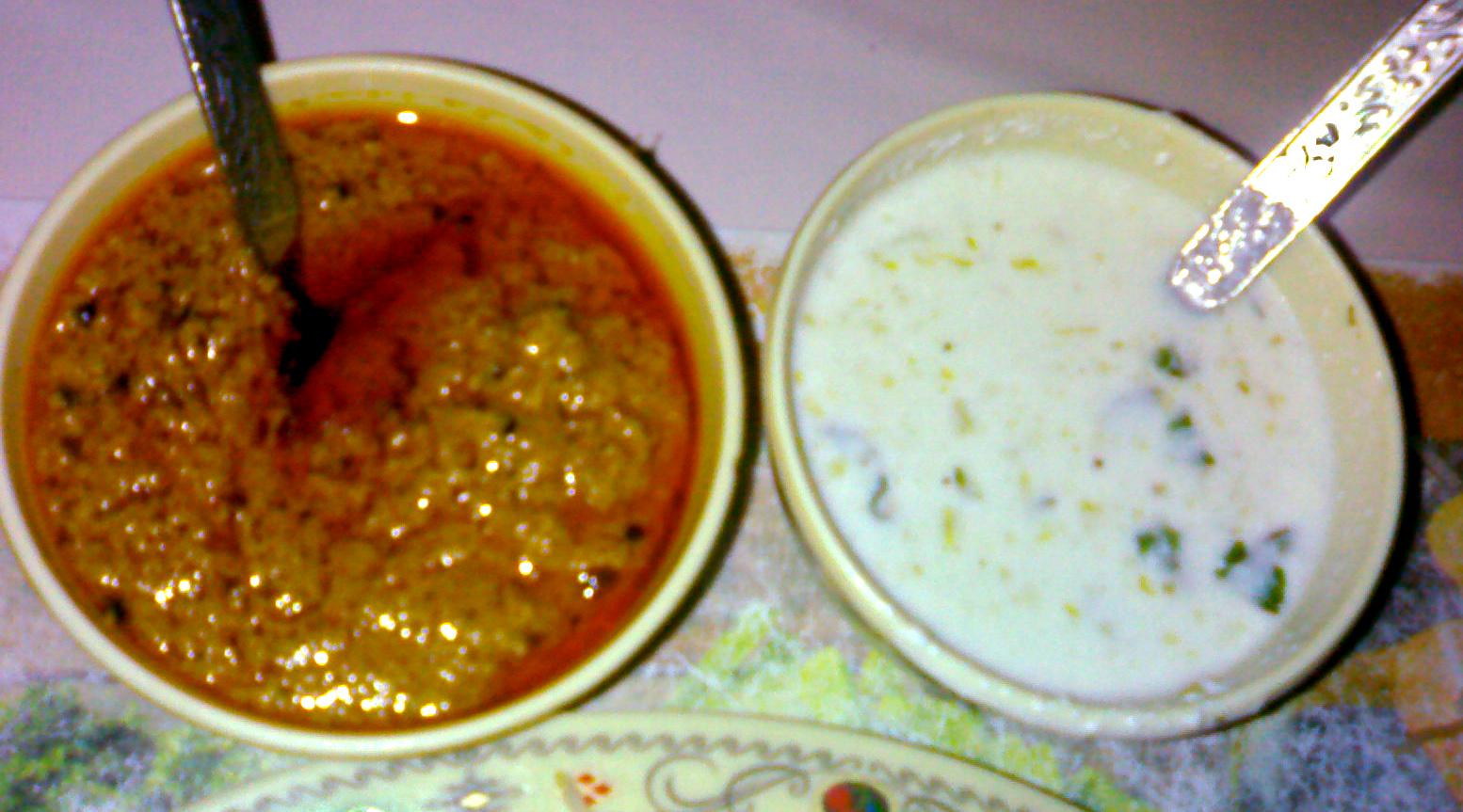
Two biryani accompaniments: mirchi ka salan and raitha/dahi chutney.

Base ingredients are basmati rice, meat (usually goat, but sometimes also chicken or beef), dahi, fried onion and ghee. Spices include cinnamon, cloves, cardamom (elaichi), bay leaves, nutmeg, papaya paste, caraway (shahi jeera), mace flower (javitri), star anise, Garam Masala, (biryani flower), lemon, and saffron.

Hyderabadi biryani is of two types: the kachchi (raw) biryani, and the pakki (cooked) biryani.

=== Kachche-gosht ki biryani ===
The kachchi biryani is prepared with kachchi gosht (raw meat) marinated with spices overnight and then soaked in curd (dahi) before cooking. The meat is layered at the bottom of special Hyderabadi Biryani degh (vessel) layerd with fragrant basmati rice and cooked "in dum" after sealing the handi (vessel) with dough. This is a challenging process as it requires meticulous attention to time and temperature to avoid over- or under-cooking the meat.

=== Vegetable dum biryani ===
The vegetable biryani is prepared with mixed vegetables in a similar manner to dum biryani with meat. It is popular among vegetarian population in North India and suitable for vegetarians.

== Accompaniments ==
A biryani is usually served with dahi chutney and mirchi ka salan. Baghaar-e-baingan is a common side dish. The salad includes onion, carrot, cucumber, and lemon wedges.

== See also ==
- Hyderabadi cuisine
- Hyderabadi haleem
- Travancore biriyani
- Biriyani
