= Sebastien Manrique =

17th-century Portuguese traveler

Sebastião Manrique
- Born: c. 1590; Porto, Portugal
- Died: 1669; London, England
- Occupation: Augustinian friar
- Known for: Missionary, traveler

Fray Sebastien Manrique (Portuguese: Sebastião Manrique; c. 1590 – 1669) was a Portuguese Augustinian missionary and traveler. He traveled around countries of the East for about sixteen years during 1628–1643. In 1653, he published his work, titled Itinerario de las Missiones Orientales del P. Manrique (Itinerary of the Oriental Missions of Father Manrique), in Rome.

Manrique traveled to India and reached Dhaka in September 1640 to inspect the Portuguese Catholic Church. He spent about 27 days in Dhaka.

In 1628–29, he travelled from Cochin to Bengal, residing in Hoogly for some months. He spent five years in Arakan, following which he travelled to Goa. He sailed for Japan, but was stopped by Portuguese authorities in Manila and Macao. After that, he returned to India. He returned to Europe by land, passing through Qandahar, Baghdad and Damascus. He had left India in 1641 and reached home in July 1643.

Particularly noted among his writings are the ones relating to Arakan, where he recorded the customs of the court and people that were mixed with Buddhist, Muslim and animist ideas. The first volume of the Itinerario is one of the few pre-19th-century western accounts of the kingdom.

He was murdered in 1669 in London by his Portuguese servant.

== See also ==
- Biryani – Manrique's account is one of the dish's earliest attestations
