= Khatti Dal =

Hyderabadi lentil curry

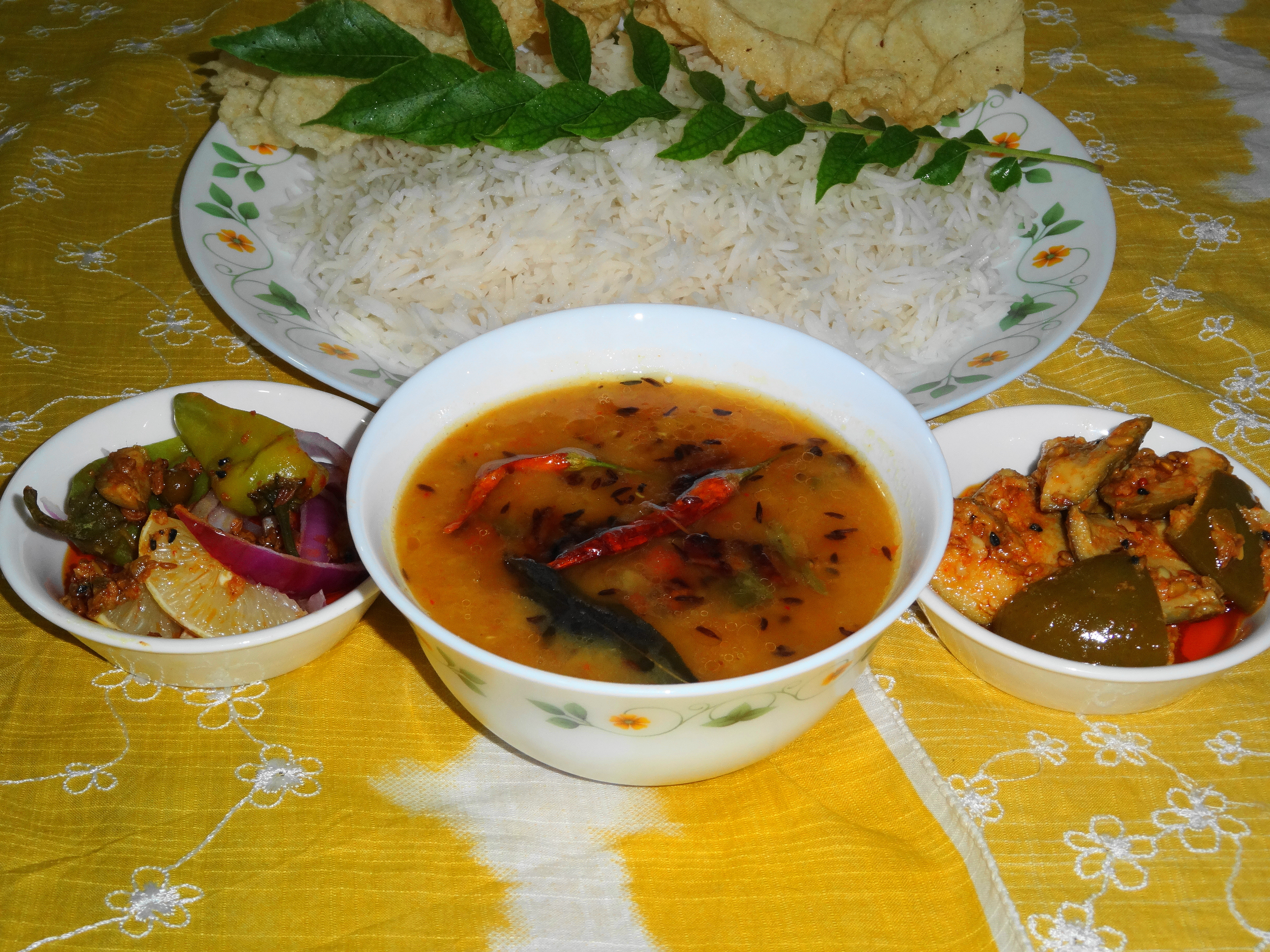
- Course: Main
- Place of origin: Deccan
- Region or state: Hyderabad
- Main ingredients: Dal, Tamarind

Khatti Dal is a sour lentil curry central to Hyderabadi cuisine. It is a type of dal made using Masoor dal or Toor dal. The word khatti literally means "sour". It refers to the tangy taste which is essential to the dish brought about by adding tamarind. Khatti dal is typically served with rice and other meat or vegetable dishes.

== See also ==
- Hyderabadi cuisine
- Dal
