= Double ka meetha =

Indian bread pudding

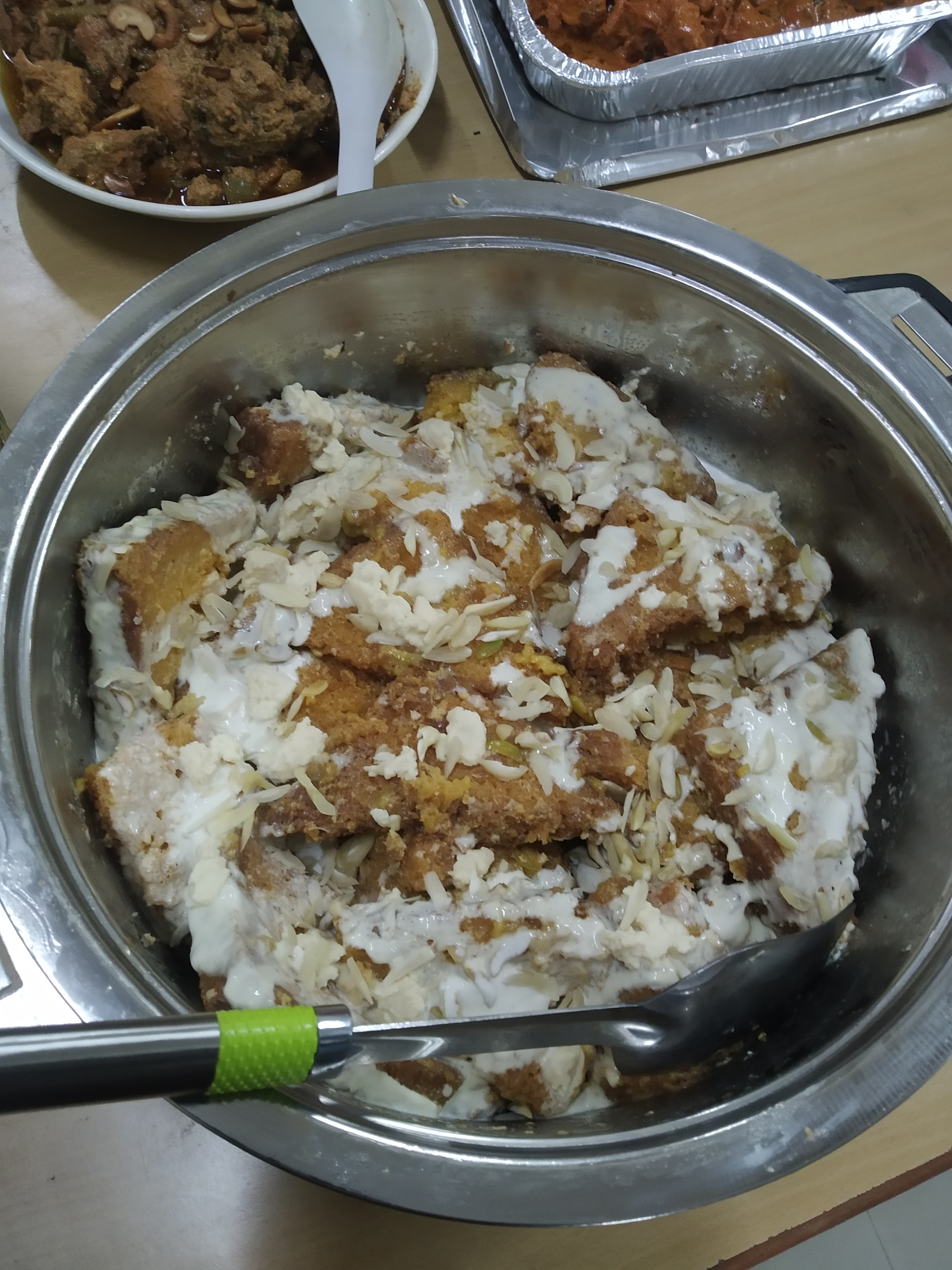
- Course: Dessert
- Place of origin: India
- Region or state: Old Hyderabad State; today popular in Maharashtra, Karnataka, Telangana, and Andhra Pradesh
- Main ingredients: Bread, milk, and nuts
- Variations: Shahi tukra

Double ka meetha is a traditional Hyderabadi dessert arising from Deccani Mughlai cuisine. The name "double ka meetha" combines the colloquial term double roti, referring to leavened milk bread that rises to nearly double its size during baking, and meetha, meaning “sweet” in Hindi and Urdu. As such, the dish literally translates to "sweet of the double bread." Double ka meetha is a staple at Muslim weddings, Eid celebrations, and other festive occasions, often served alongside or after a course of biryani.

The origins of double ka meetha date back to the time of the Nizams of Hyderabad, whose royal kitchens fostered the development of Hyderabadi cuisine. Double ka meetha is believed to have been inspired by shahi tukda, a dessert popular in Mughal-era North India, but was adapted locally using available bread and infused with regional flavorings such as saffron and kewra water.

The dish is made using a few simple yet indulgent ingredients. At its core is double roti, which is deep-fried in ghee until golden brown and crisp. A sugar syrup is prepared with sugar, water, and aromatic ingredients like cardamom, saffron, kewra water, and rose water. Once the bread is fried, it is soaked in the syrup to absorb the flavors. Often, a layer of rabri or mawa is added for extra richness. Nuts such as almonds, pistachios, and cashews are roasted in ghee and sprinkled on top. On festive occasions, a delicate layer of varak is often added for an opulent finish. The dessert is allowed to rest so that the bread soaks up the syrup while retaining a slightly chewy texture. Double ka meetha can be served warm or chilled, depending on preference.

While the basic recipe remains unchanged, modern variations include baked versions for reduced oil content, versions made with condensed milk for convenience, and even vegan alternatives such as plant-based milks. Contemporary restaurants may serve small portions in dessert glasses or fusion-style platings.

== See also ==
- Qubani ka meetha
