= Hyderabadi cuisine =

Native cooking style of Hyderabad, India

Hyderabadi cuisine (native: Hyderabadi Ghizaayat), also known as Deccani cuisine, is the cooking style characteristic of the city of Hyderabad and its surrounding area in Telangana, India.

Hyderabadi cuisine is an amalgamation of Indian, Mughalai, Turkic, and Arabic also influenced by the culinary habits of common people in the Golconda Sultanate. Hyderabadi cuisine comprises a broad repertoire of rice, wheat, and meat dishes and the skilled use of various spices, herbs and natural edibles.

The haute cuisine of Hyderabad began to develop after the foundation of the Bahmani Sultanate, and the Qutb Shahi dynasty centered in the city of Hyderabad promoted the native cuisine along with their own. Hyderabadi cuisine had become a princely legacy of the Nizams of Hyderabad as it began to further develop under their patronage. Hyderabadi cuisine has different recipes for different events, and hence is categorized accordingly, from banquet food, to weddings and parties, festival foods, and travel foods. The category to which the recipe belongs itself speaks of different things like the time required to prepare the food, the shelf life of the prepared item, etc.

== History ==
=== Medieval period ===
The Deccan Plateau in which Hyderabad is located is a large inland region in India. Its cuisine was largely local and traditional until the days of the Vijayanagara Empire. When Muhammad bin Tughluq moved the capital of his dominion from Delhi to Daulatabad, the region was exposed to and adopted dishes from other areas. This grew to include influences from Turkish cuisine when in the 14th century when the Bahmani Sultanate was formed and turkish nobles were appointed to high positions in the region's government.

Two centuries of inbound migration accompanying great political and cultural change introduced further culinary influences to the region.

In Deccan medieval cuisine, banquets were common among the aristocracy. Multiple courses would be prepared and served in Dastarkhān style, placed on a long cloth laid on the floor. Food was generally eaten without utensils, both by nobility and the general population. Dishes based on meat became more common and the use of spices increased. Fresh fruit became a common dessert. A drink of Kahwa became a popular digestive. Ingredients used in dishes varied according to the seasons and festivals, and many items were preserved in the form of pickles.

=== Modern period ===
The modern cuisine was evolved during the Nizams in the mid-17th century, and elevated to a sublime art form. Hyderabad has a history of continuous influx of migrants from all over the world and in general from the Indian sub-continent, particularly since 1857. Most of the foreign food had been improved to suit the culinary preferences, resulting to form the unique derivative cuisine that excels over the original. Biryani and Haleem (Arabic) for instance is prepared all over India, but the Hyderabadi variety is ultimately from the Hyderabadi Biryani and Hyderabadi Haleem. Til ke chatuni with Arabic tahini, Persian dried lamb with beans is modified with dalcha, tandoori naan of Uzbek (Central Asia) to create Sheermal. Most of the modern day desserts in Hyderabadi cuisine were introduced and invented during the times of Nizams, today that had become an integral part of cuisine.

Hyderabadi cuisine is an integral part of the cuisines of the former Hyderabad State that includes the state of Telangana and the regions of Marathwada (now in Maharashtra) and Kalyana-Karanataka (now in Karnataka). The Hyderabadi cuisine contains city-specific specialties like Hyderabad (Hyderabadi biryani and Hyderabadi Haleem) and Aurangabad (Naan Qalia), Parbhani (Biryani and Tahari), Bidar (Kalyani Biryani) and others. The use of dry coconut, tamarind, and red chillies along with other spices are the main ingredients that make Hyderabadi cuisine different from the North Indian cuisine.

== Course ==
Hyderabadi dinner also known as Dastarkhwan are usually of five course meal; Aghaz (Soup), Mezban (appetizers), Waqfa (Sorbet), Mashgool Dastarkhwan (Main course) and Zauq-e-shahi (dessert).

== Starters ==
=== Lukhmi ===
Deep fried minced meat stuffed lukhmi

Lukhmi is a regional non-vegetarian variation of the samosa, though it is shaped into a flat square patty. It is made from flour and stuffed with minced mutton or beef, known as kheema. It is eaten as an evening snack or served as a starter at celebrations.

=== Murtabak ===
Murtabak is often described as spicy folded omelette pancake with bits of vegetables. It is the most common form of Murtabak; which is egg-filled pancake, sometimes mixed with green onion and minced meat, made from pan fried crepes which is folded and cut to squares.

=== Hyderabadi Haleem ===
Hyderabadi Haleem is a popular dish of Hyderabad. It is a stew composed of mutton, lentils, spices and wheat. It originates from Harees, an Arab dish brought to Hyderabad by Arab migrants. Harees is still prepared in its original form in Barkas. It is sometimes served as a starter at celebrations, but it is usually only prepared during the month of Ramadan for the Iftar meal.

=== Biryani ===
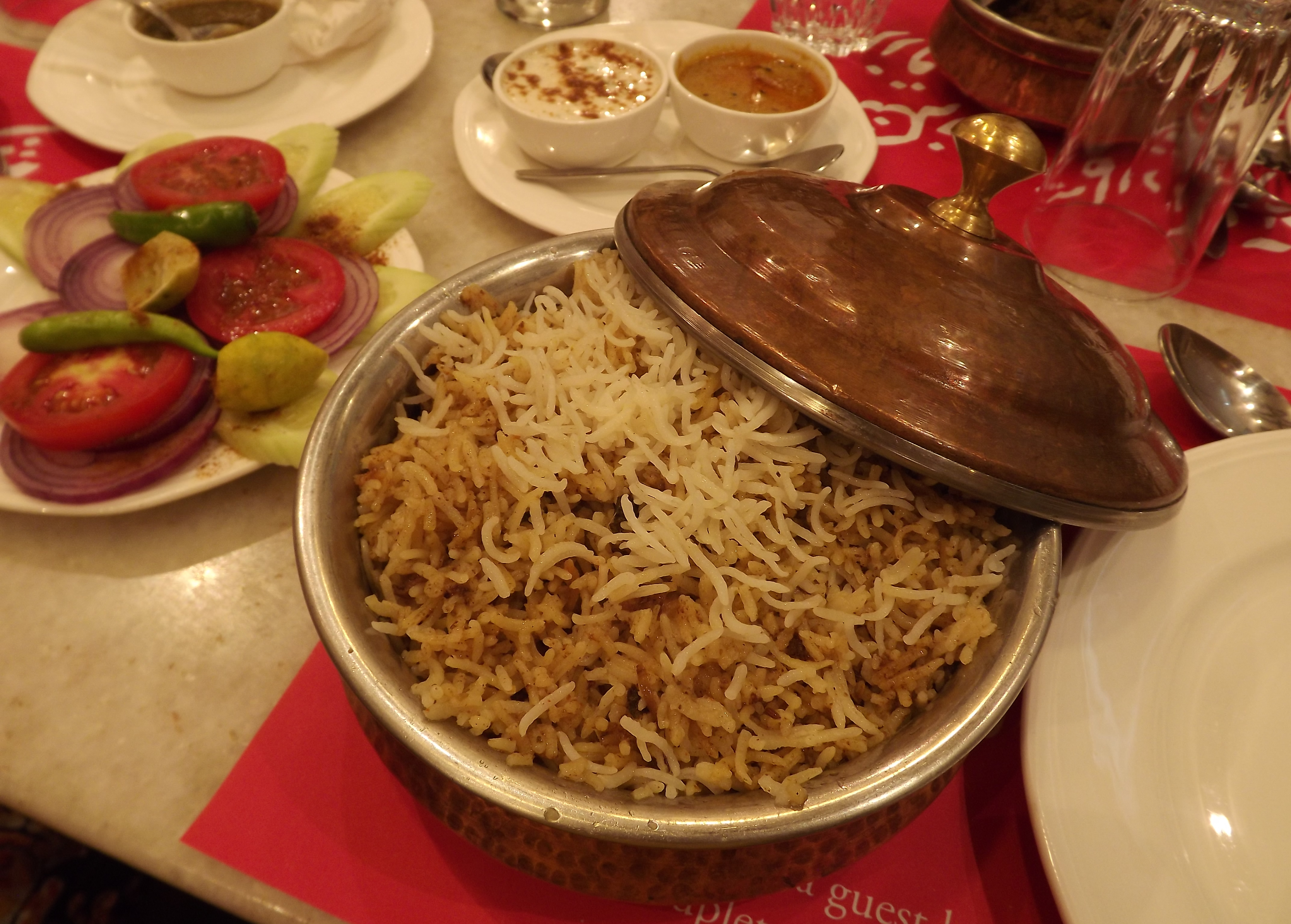
Hyderabadi Biryani with salad (left), Mirchi-ka-Salan (top right), and Dahi-ki-Chutney (top left). The layer of meat is hidden under the layer of rice.

Hyderabadi Biryani is one of the most popular dishes of the city. It is distinctly different from other variations of the Biryani, originating from the kitchens of the Nizams of Hyderabad. It is a celebration dish of basmati rice and mutton, along with yoghurt, onions and various spices. It is a key dish to the cuisine and it is said that the dish is considered synonymous with the city of Hyderabad.

=== Variants ===
- Kalyani Biryani is a variant of the Hyderabadi Biryani using beef instead of lamb or mutton. This meal was started after Kalyani Nawabs of Bidar came to Hyderabad sometime in the 18th century. The Kalyani biryani is made with small cubes of beef, regular spices, onions and many tomatoes. It has a distinct tomato, jeera (cumin), dhania (coriander) flavour.
- Tahari, made by the Hyderabadi Muslims is a rice and meat dish. Unlike biryani in which rice is precooked and then layered with meat, rice in tahari is cooked in meat. Occasionally vegetables, more commonly potatoes, are also added. It is served with dahi ki chutney.

== Main entrees ==
Pathar-ka-gosht heating on a wide stone

=== Pathar-ka-gosht ===
Pathar-ka-gosht is a mutton kebab. It is named for the traditional method of preparation, on a stone slab. (Pathar means 'stone' in Urdu as well as Hindi.)

=== Hyderabadi khichdi ===
The Hyderabadi version of khichdi is distinct from the many variants in other parts of India. It is eaten with kheema (minced mutton curry). It is consumed as a breakfast item, as well as during the month of Ramadan for the Sehri meal.

While most khichdi preparations use toor or moong dal, the Hyderabadi version uses masoor dal. Also, turmeric doesn’t feature in the ingredients list although some people use it in the modern preparations. The colouring of the dish comes from the caramelized onions that are an important flavour of the dish. As opposed to the semi-liquid, moist preparation of khichdi elsewhere in the country, the dish made here has a drier texture, and each grain of rice stands out.

— Nawab Mehboob Alam Khan, culinary expert

=== Talawa gosht ===
Tala huwa gosht, or talawa gosht (in Hyderabadi dialect) is a simple mutton or beef dish usually accompanied by khatti dal. It may be eaten with roti or rice.

== Desserts ==
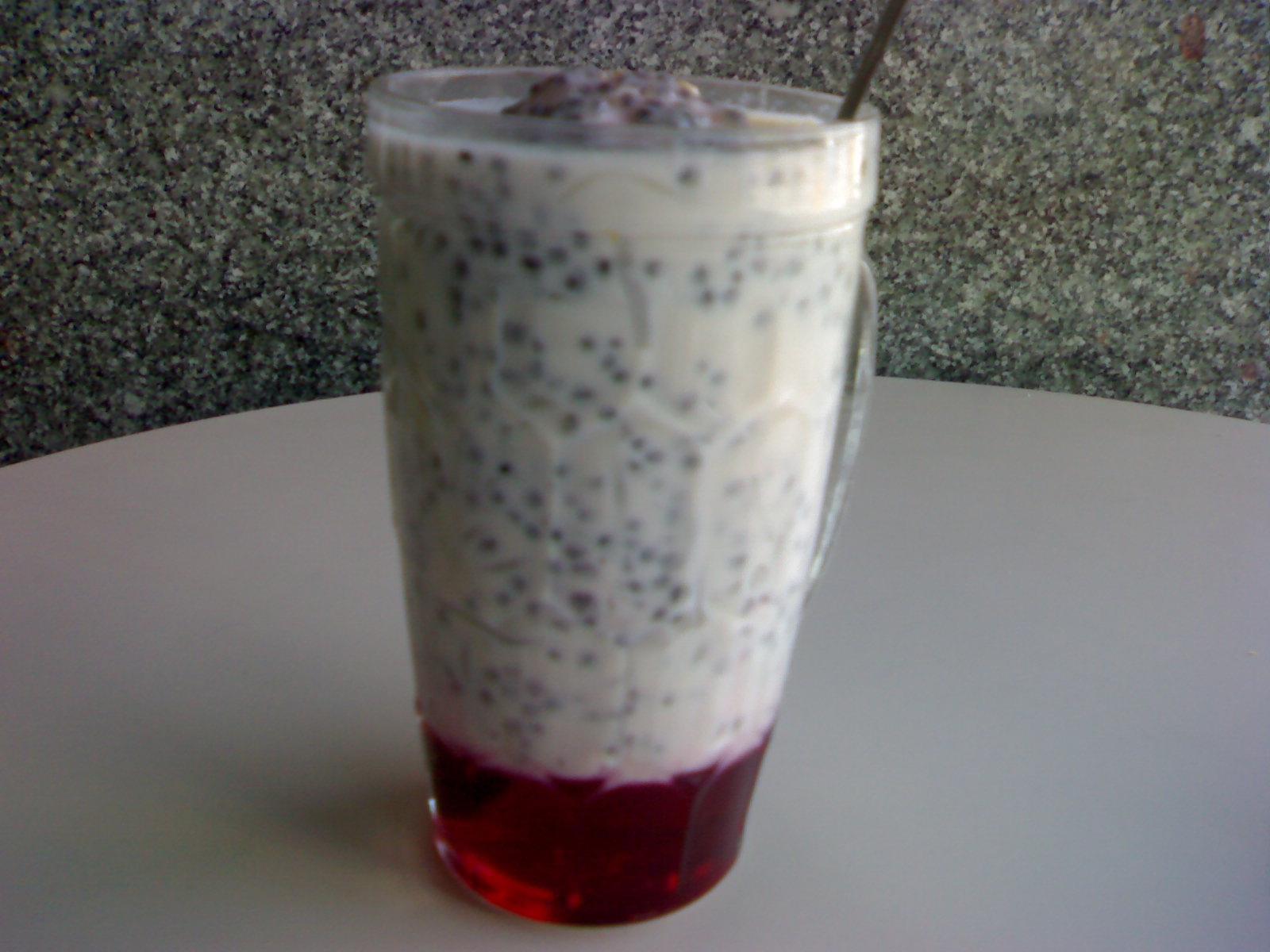
Faluda

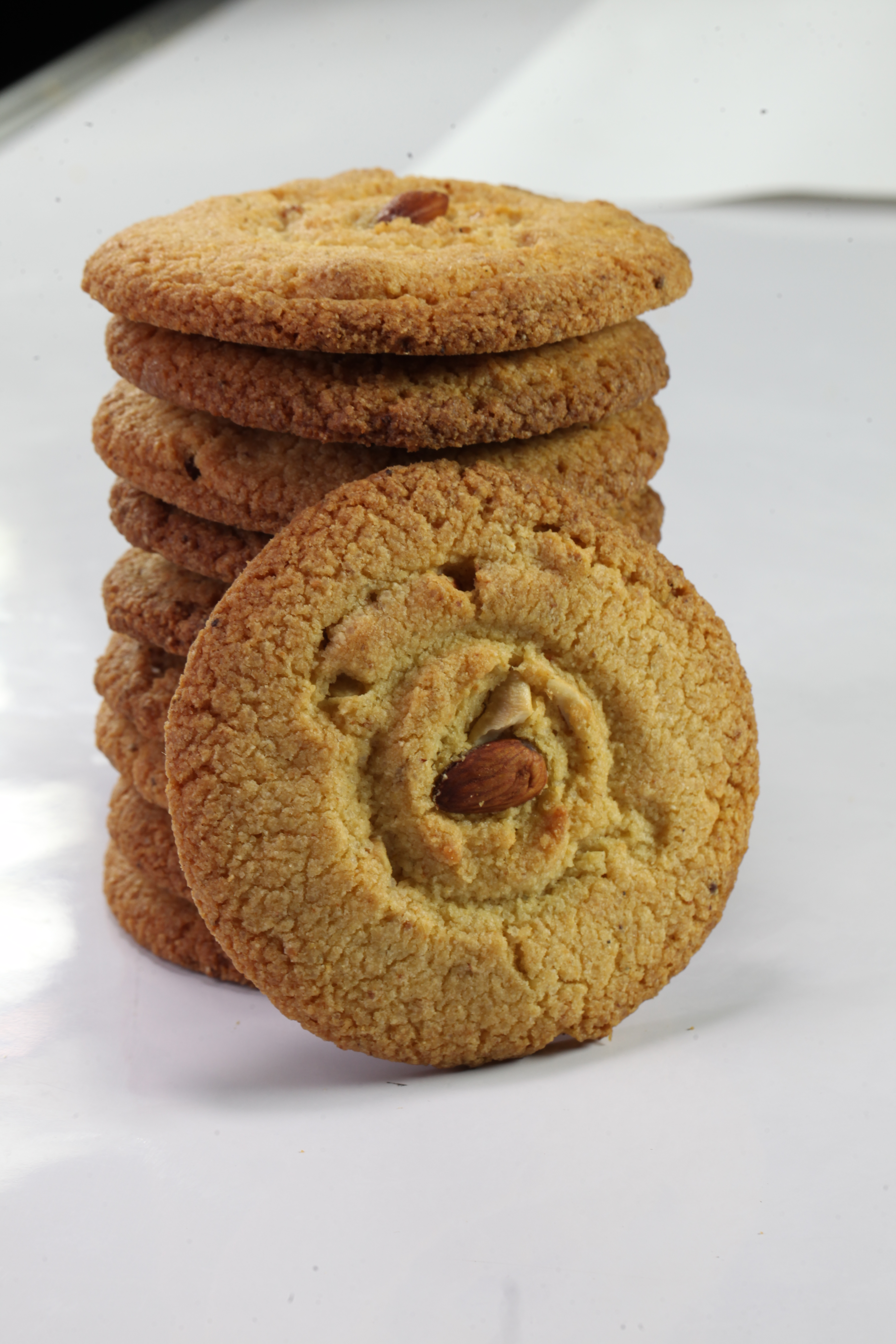
- Dum ka roat
  Qubani ka meetha (Khubani-ka-meetha) - Apricot pudding, topped with almond and cream. The original recipe is a translucent liquid.
- Double ka meetha- Bread pudding topped with dry fruits, a derivative of the Mughlai dessert shahi tukre.
- Sheer korma - Vermicelli pudding and celebratory dessert, specially made on the Ramzan (Eid Ul Fitr) day.
- Firni (Payasam) - A rice dessert.
- Gil-e-firdaus - A variant of kheer made of bottle gourd. The name literally translates into "the clay of paradise".
- Faluda - A dessert made of shredded vermicelli noodles with rose syrup and milk.
- Aab ka shola (aab shola) - Typical Hyderabadi summer sharbat.
- Osmania Biscuit is a popular biscuit, usually accompanied with tea.
- Hyderabadi Irani tea available at Irani cafes.
- Dum-ke-roat - a sweet confectionary made especially during the month of Muharram.

== Breads ==
- Naan
- Sheermal

== Images ==
Hyderabadi cuisine
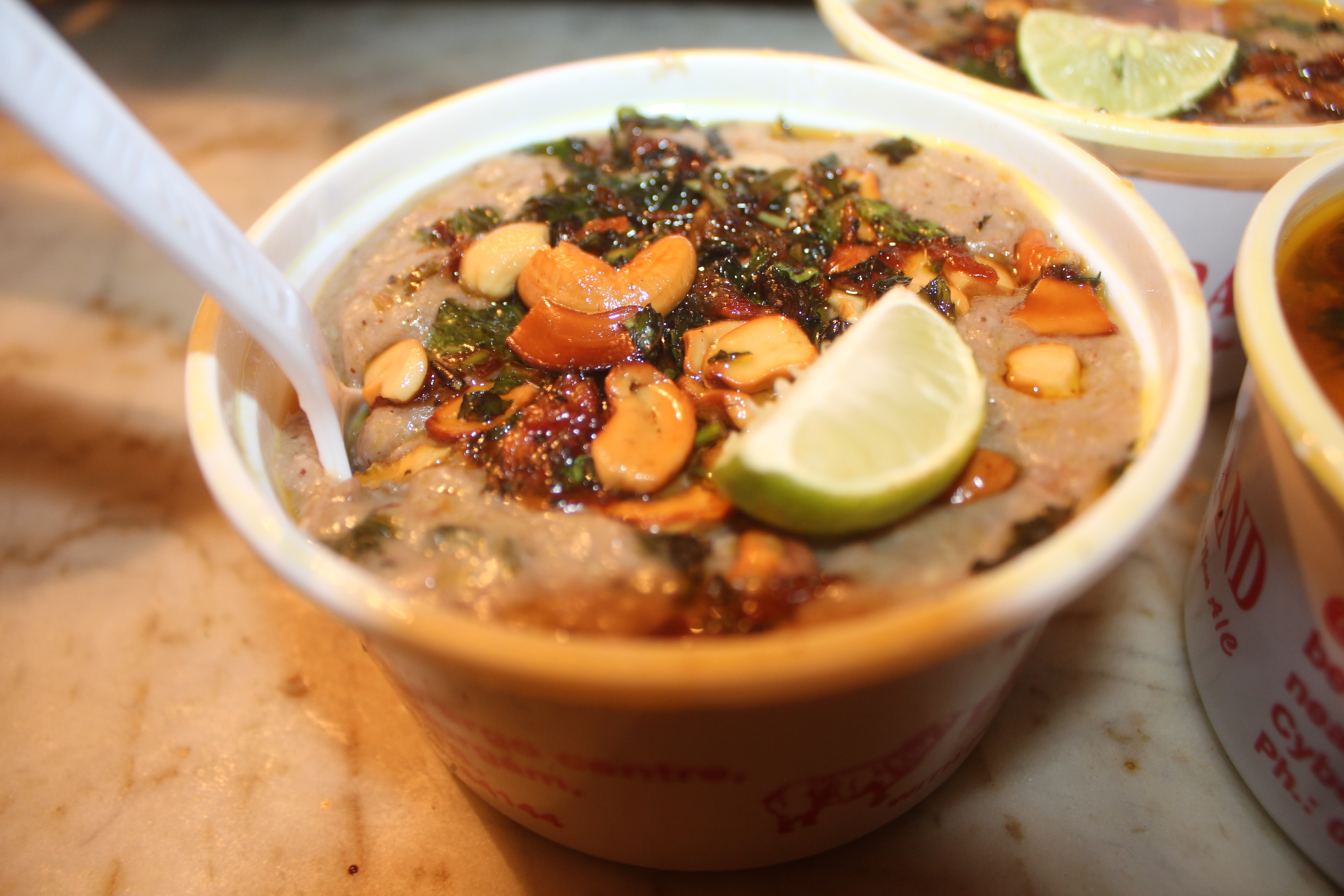
Hyderabadi haleem

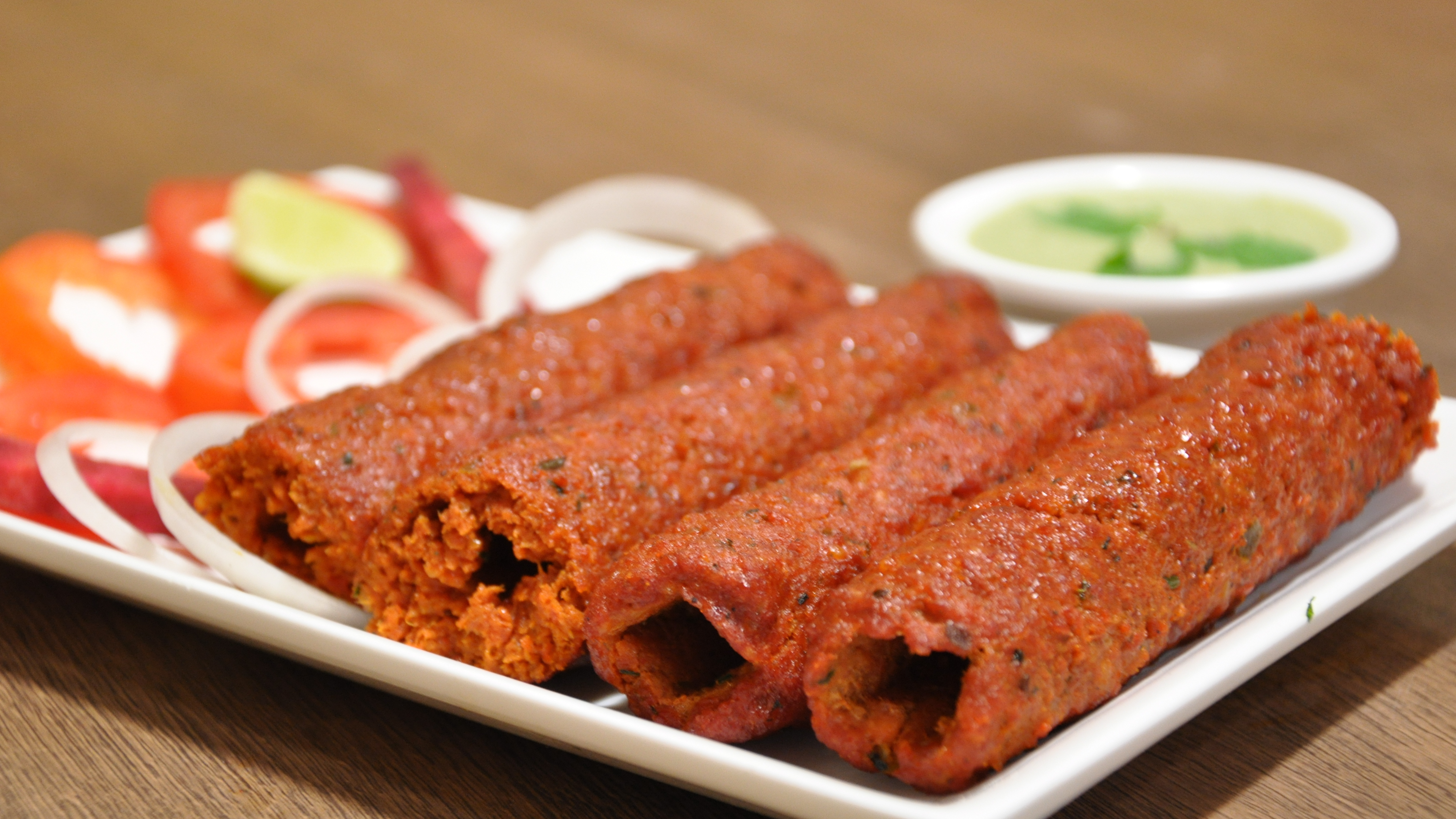
Seekh kebab

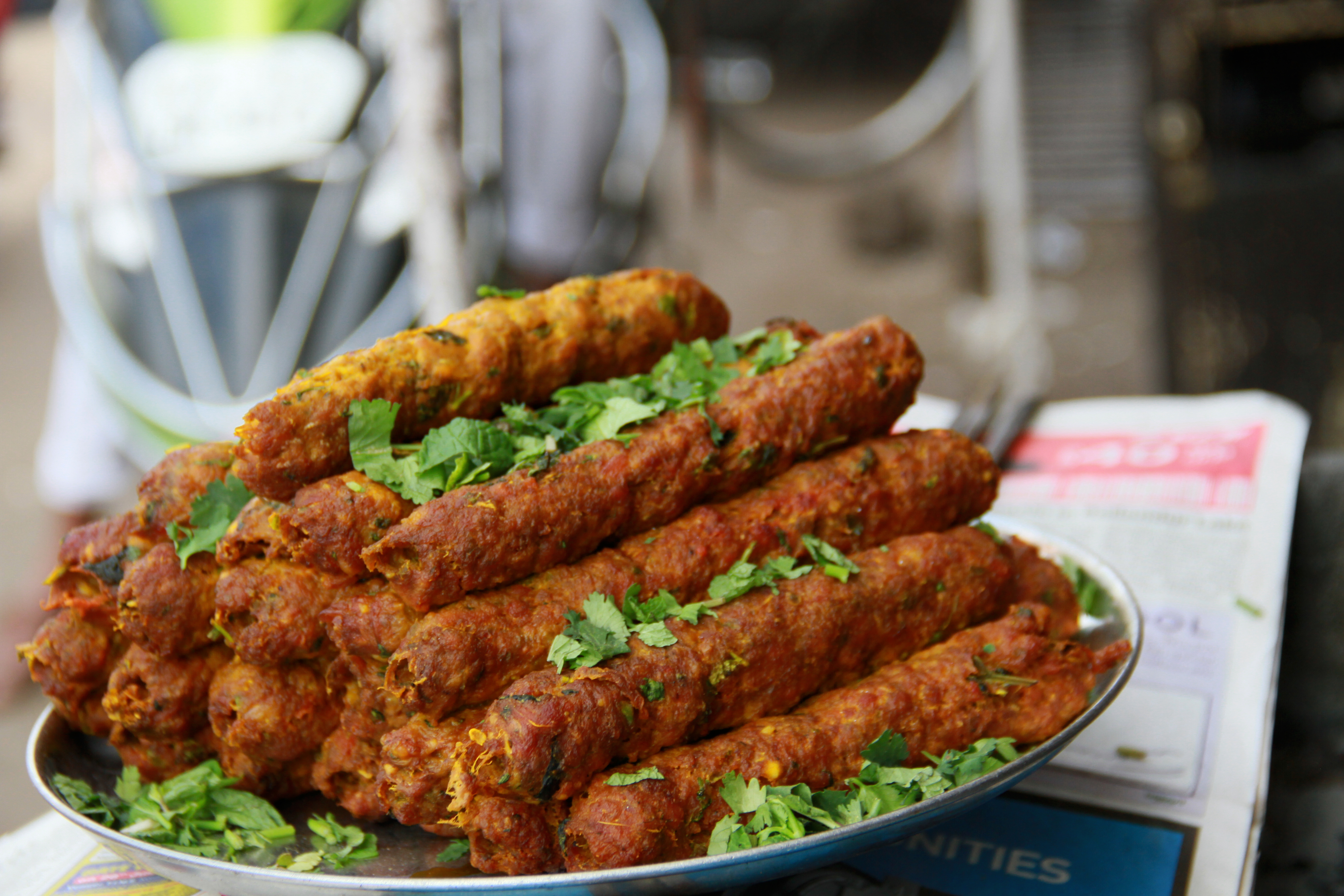
Seekh kebab

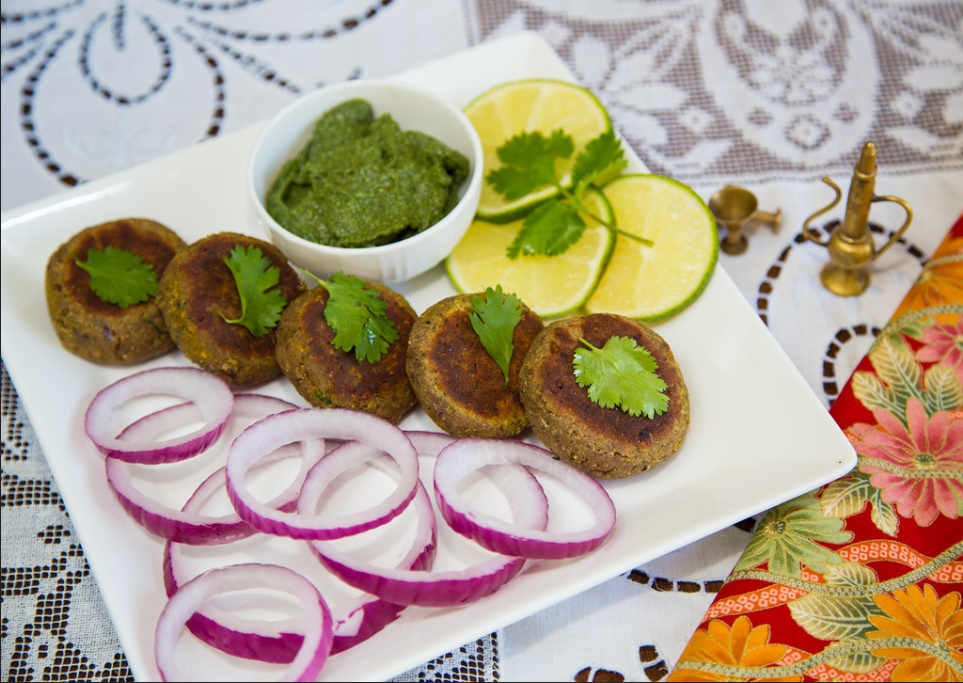
Shami kebab

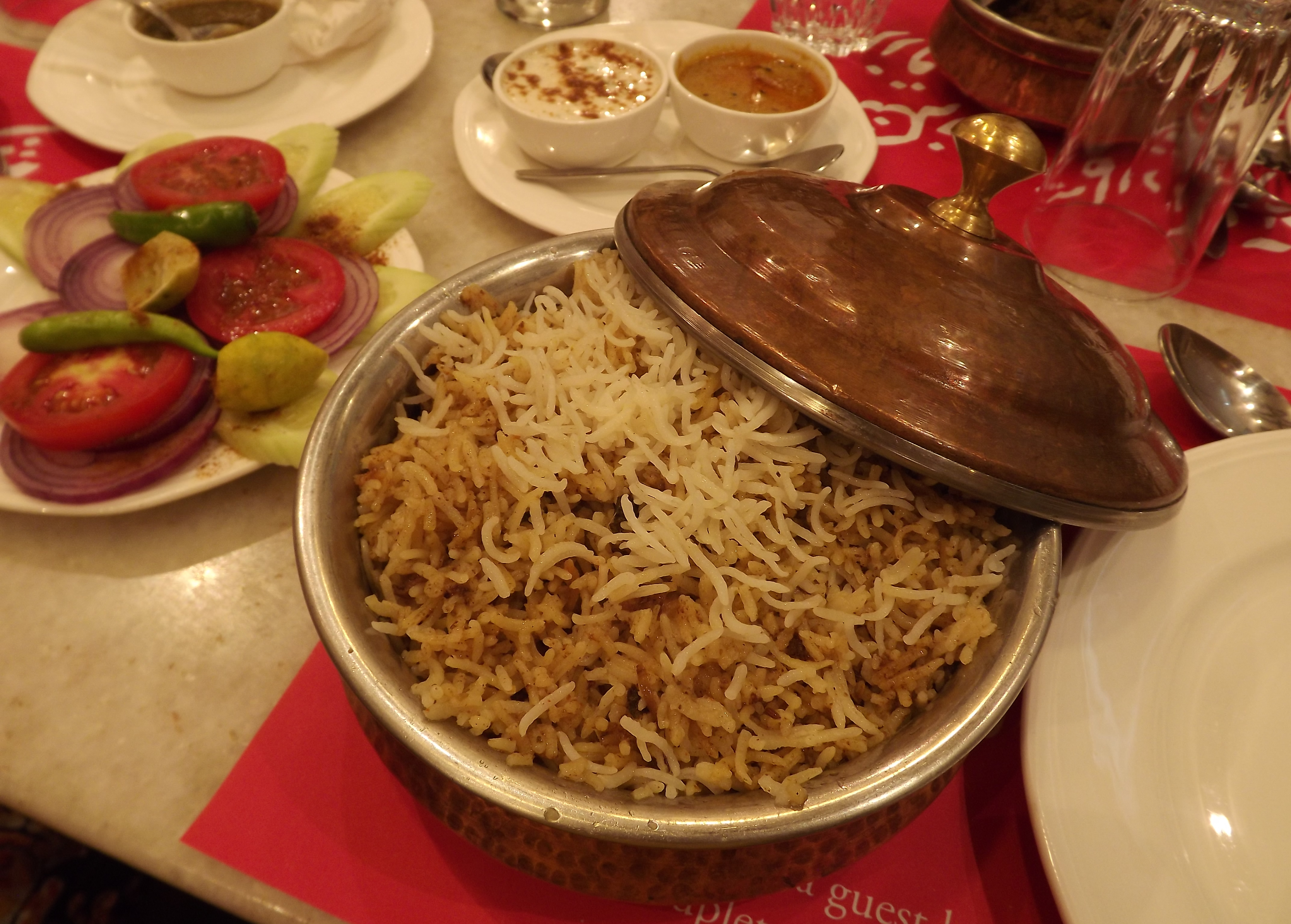
Hyderabadi biryani along with mirchi ka salan

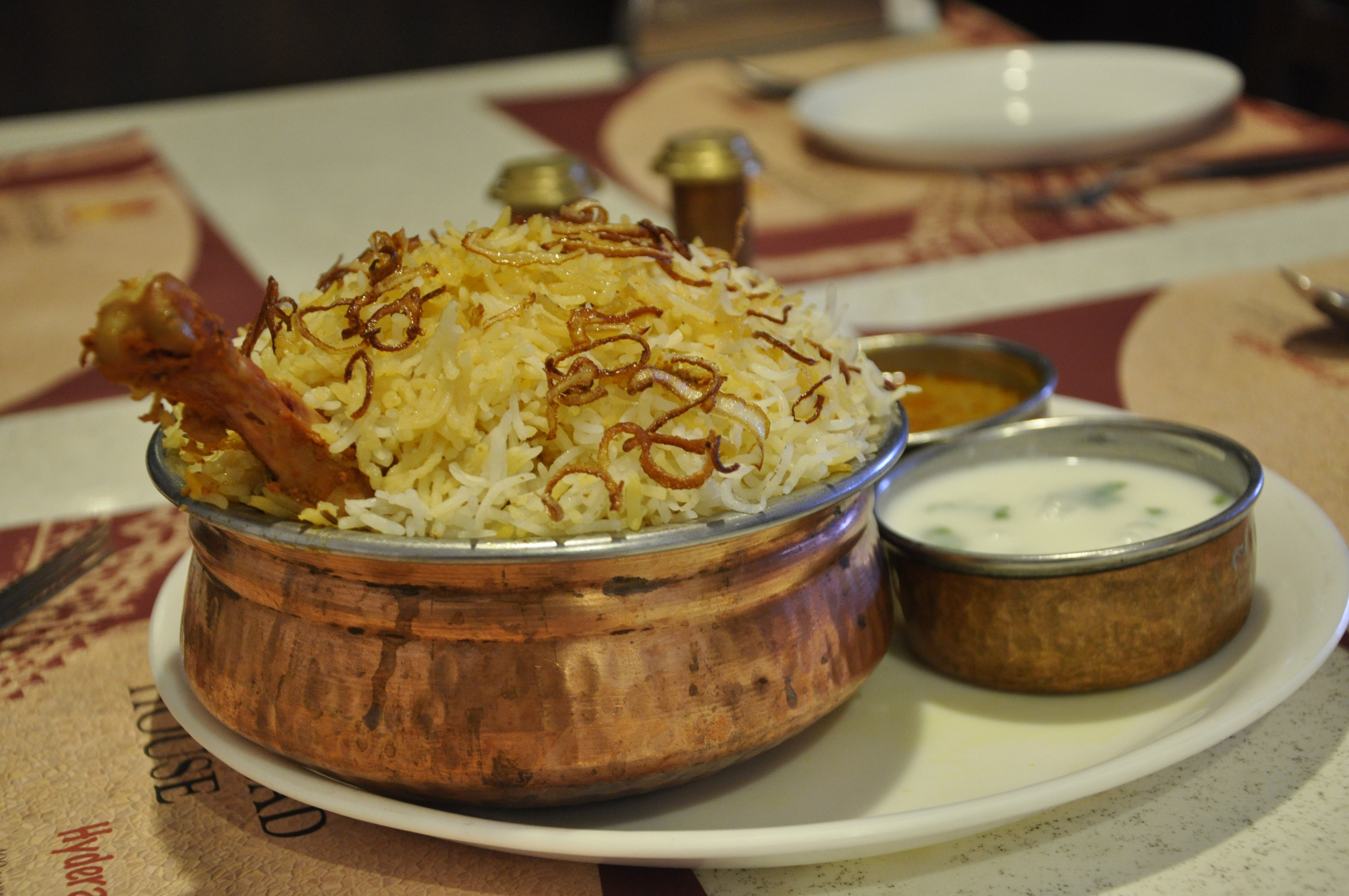
Hyderabadi chicken biryani

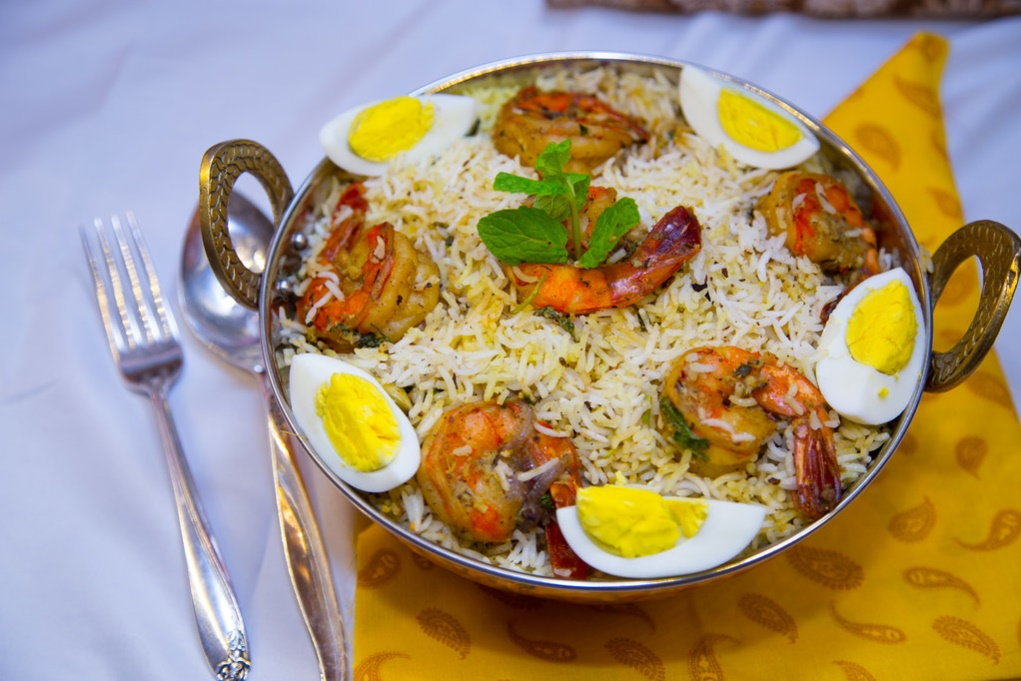
Prawn biryani

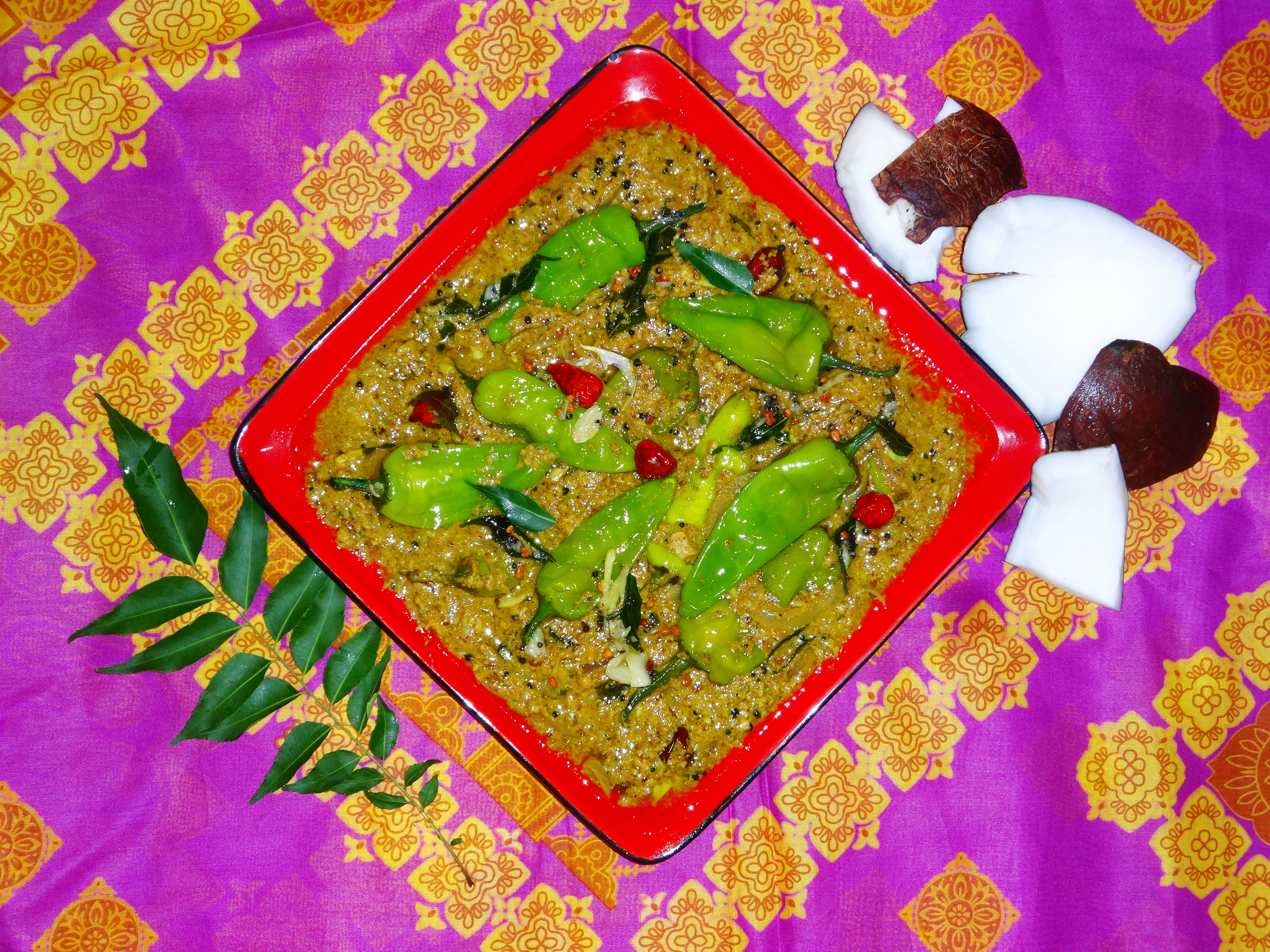
Mirchi ka salan

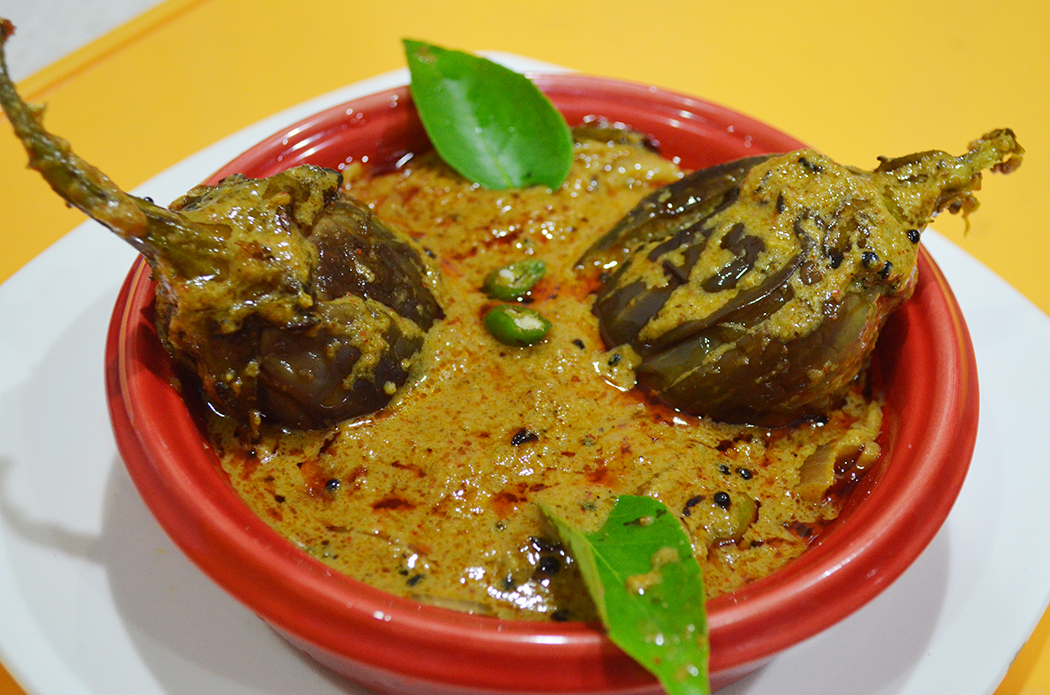
Baghaar-e-baingan

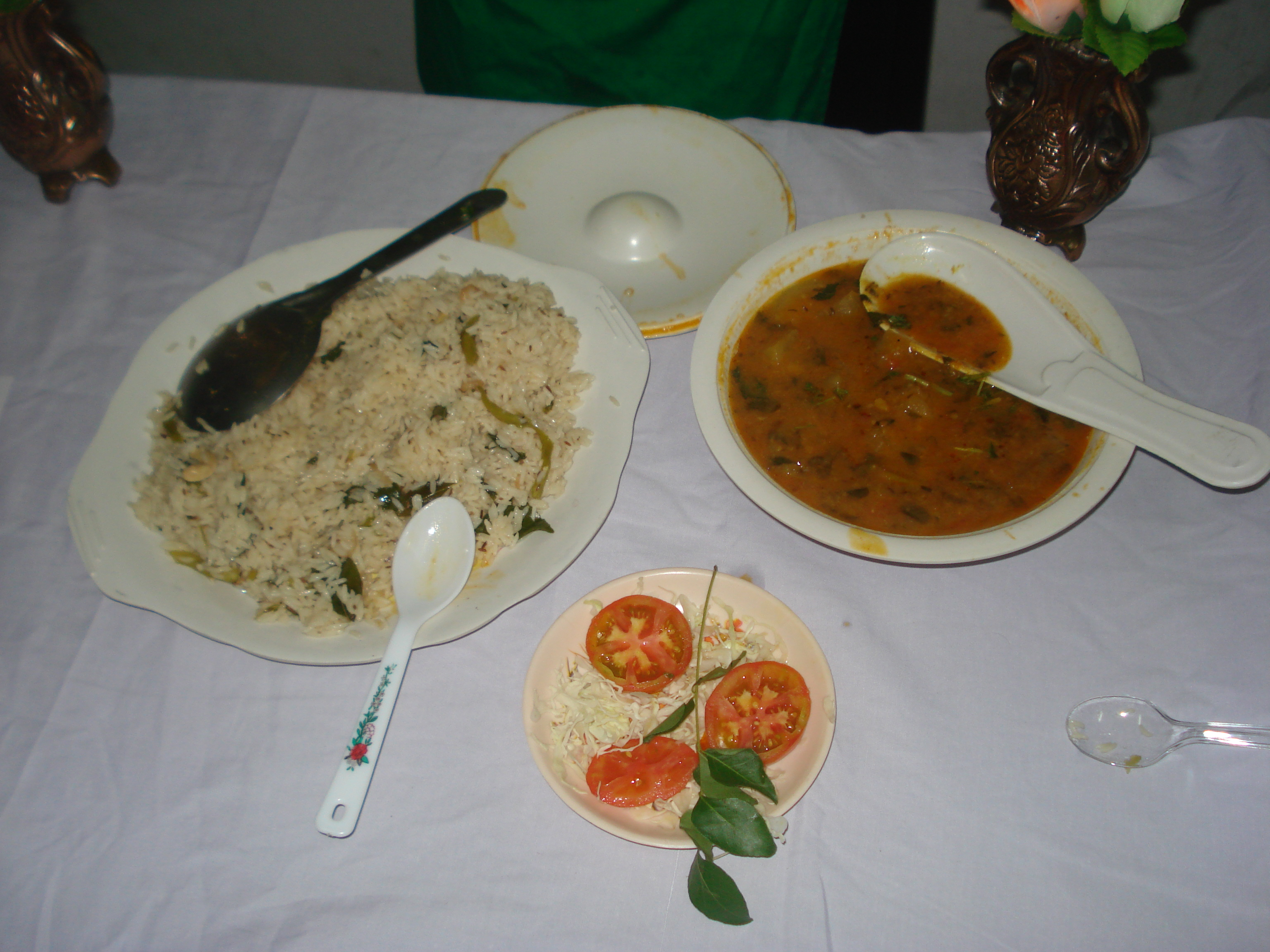
Bagara khana and dalcha

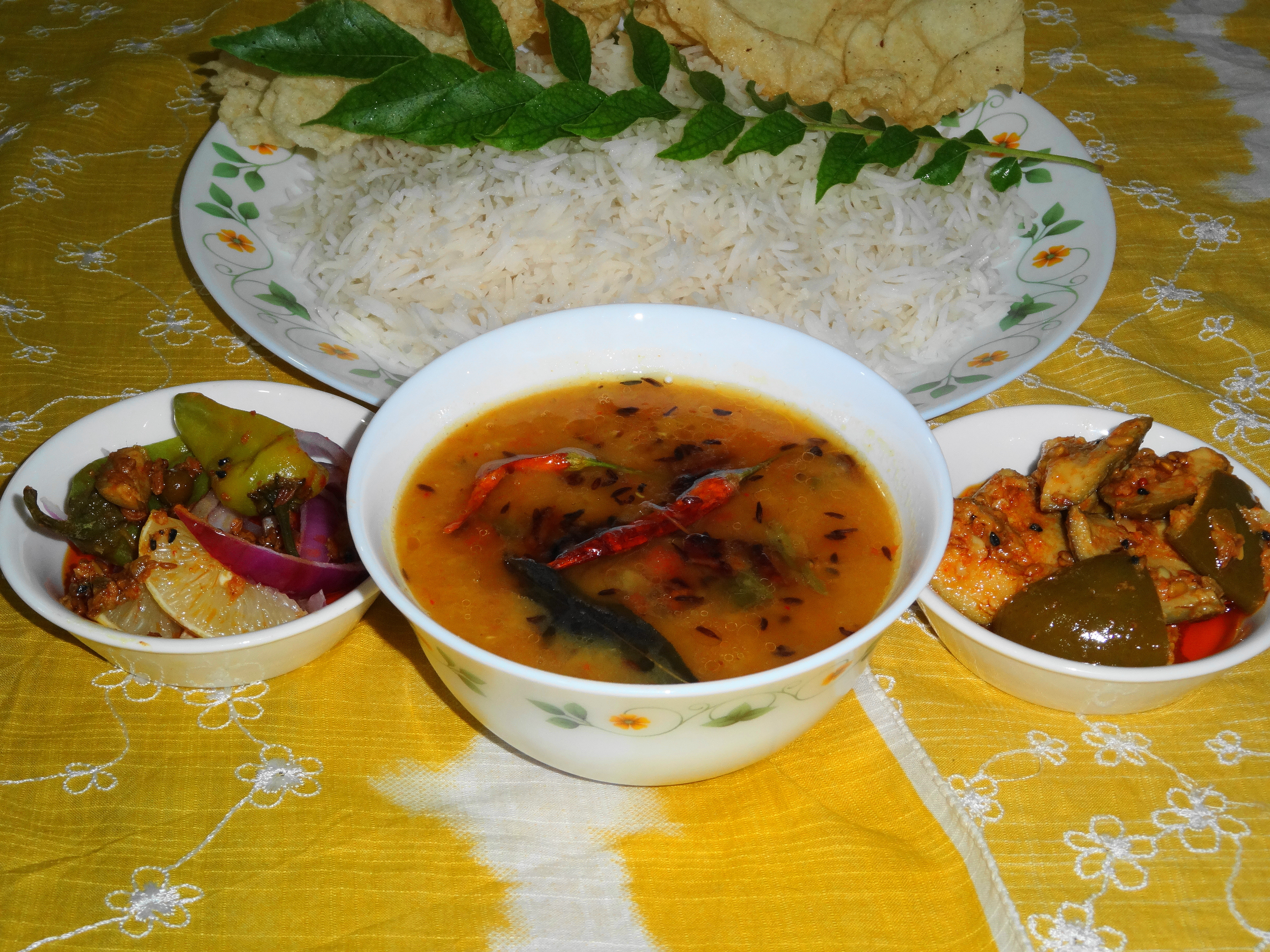
Rice along with khatti dal and pickle

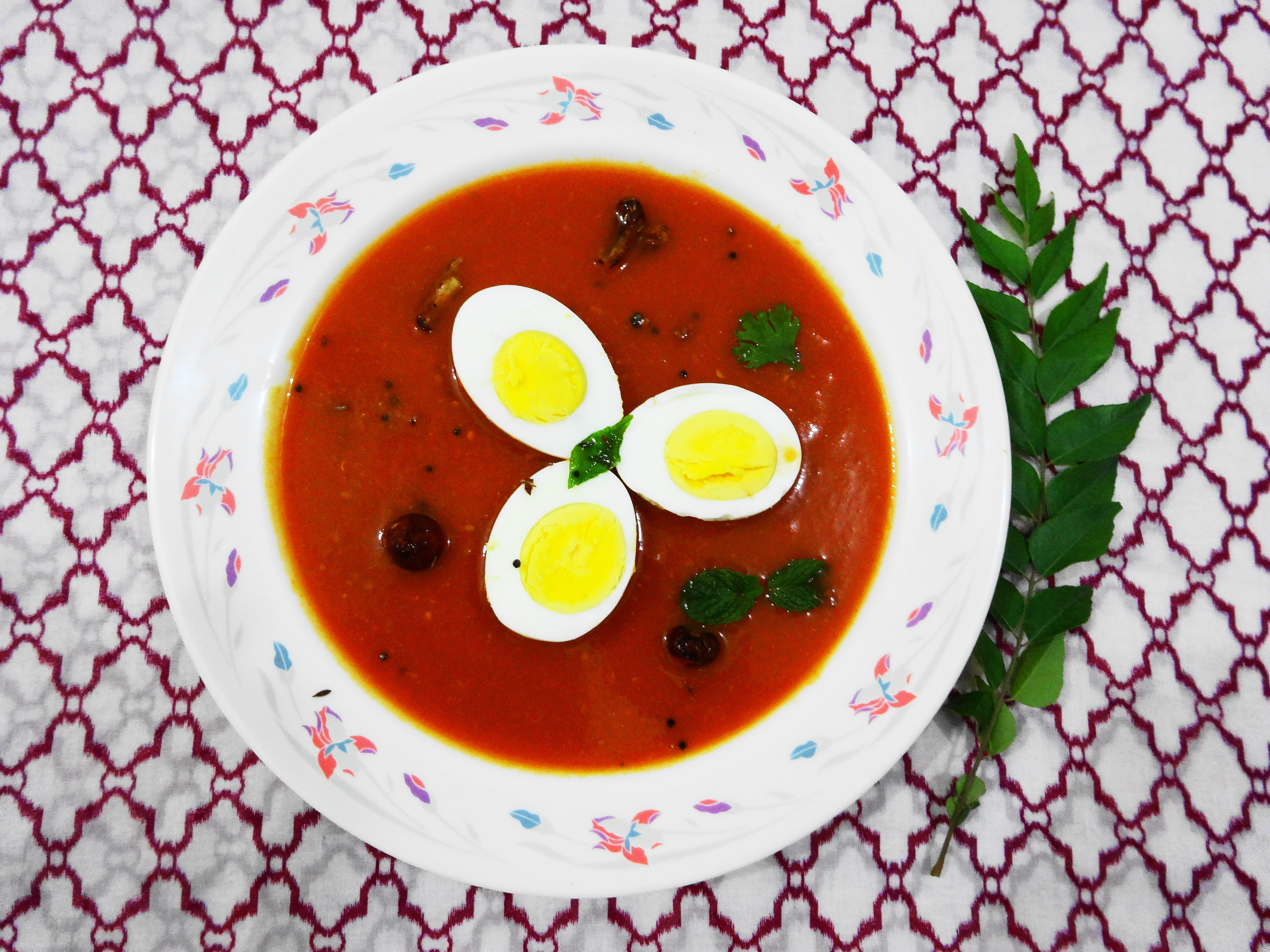
Hyderabadi tamatar ka kat (curry made of tomato soup)

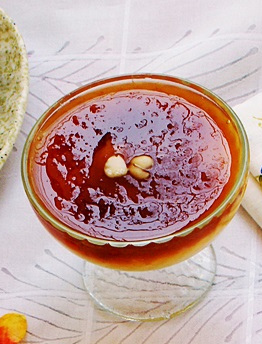
Khubani-ka-Meetha

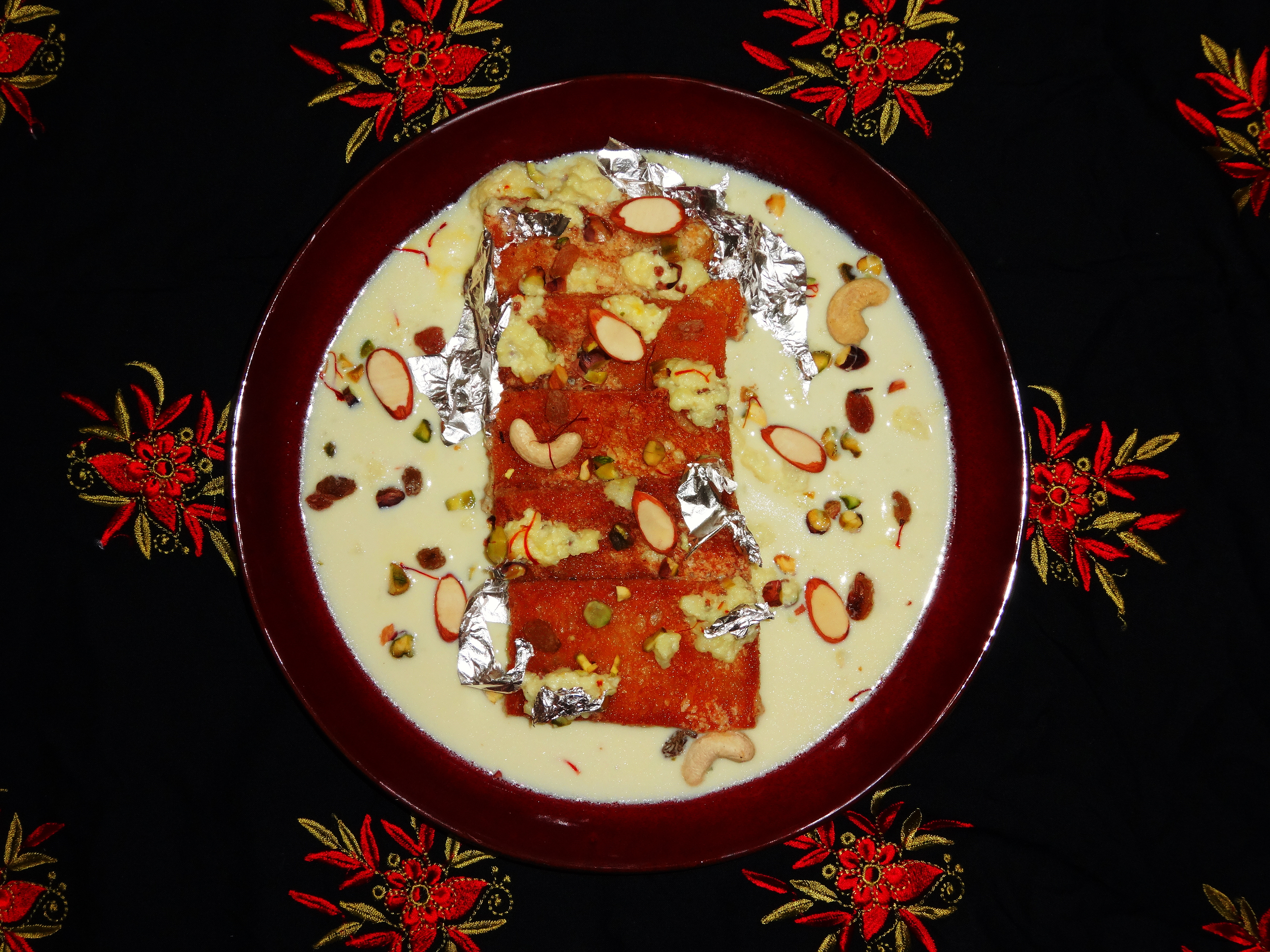
Double ka meetha
