= Bibi-Ka-Alam =

Annual procession during Muharram

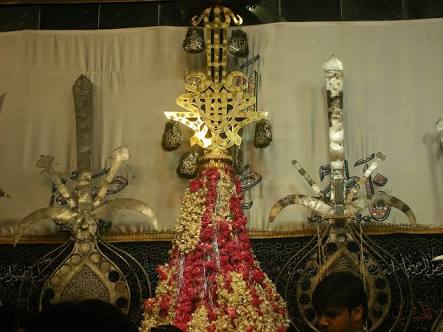
- Tazīya at Alawa-e-bibi
- Observed by: Shia muslims of Hyderabad
- Type: Mourning of Husayn ibn Ali
- Celebrations: Mourning
- Observances: 10 Muharram Every Year (Lunar Calendar)
- Begins: on 1st muharram every year
- Ends: on 10th muharram every year
- Frequency: annual

Bibi-Ka-Alam or Bibi-Ka-Alawa is an annual procession during Muharram. Bibi-ka-Alam, installed in the name of Imam Hussain, grandson of Muhammad and son of Ali ibn Abi Talib and Muhammad's daughter Fatimah, at the Bibi ka Alawa at Dabirpura, Old City (Hyderabad, India) on the 10th day following Moharram. It is a Shia event. The procession starts at Alawa-e-bibi situated at Dabirpura and ends at Chaderghat. During the procession the devotees mourn the death by reciting Nauhey, (narrating the incidents occurred during 10th Moharram 61 Hijri in Karbala). The daughter of Mohammed, Fatima-e-Zehra, is called Bibi. The locality is known as Mohalla Bibi Ka Alawa.

== History ==
Throughout the history of Qutub Shahi reign, the tradition of Azadari or mourning of the death of Imam Hussain and his followers was conducted with high regard under state supervision.

This Ashur Khana was renovated by the Seventh Nizam under the advice of Nawab Zain Yar Jung. The main entrance and its roof remain unaltered on which 1199 H, the year of construction is engraved. The room in which the alam is installed is a strong room and the Alam is kept in a safe made on the design of a sarcophagus (Zarih).

== The Relic ==
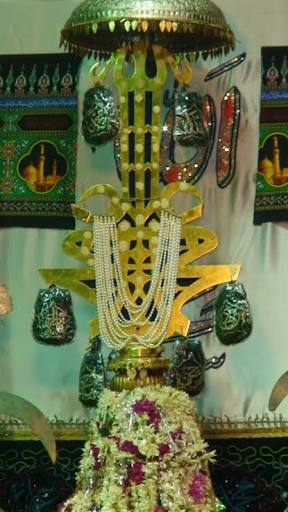
relic of bibi ka alam

There is a relic enclosed in this alam as well. The relic is a piece of the wooden plank on which Syeda Fatimah was given her final ablution by her husband before burial. This relic was in Karbala for a very long time. In the time of Abdullah Qutub Shah it reached Golkonda. The relic was preserved in the calligraphic alam with Arabic lettering of Allah, Mohammed and Ali. It was covered with an alloy of metals and gold. Later Nasir-ud-daulah offered jewellery to the alam which still exists.

== The Procession ==
This alam is the symbol of the climax of the observance of the Moharrum mourning in Hyderabad. It comes out on an elephant on the 10th of Moharrum.

The alam, as it emerges from the Alawa, the mourners keep chanting Ibn-az-Zehra Wa Waila, which means "Goodbye Son Of Zehra," which is a protestation against the slaying of Zehra's son Hussain. Since long years it is a tradition of the mourners in the procession to chant these words.

== Muharram procession from Ashoorkhana ==
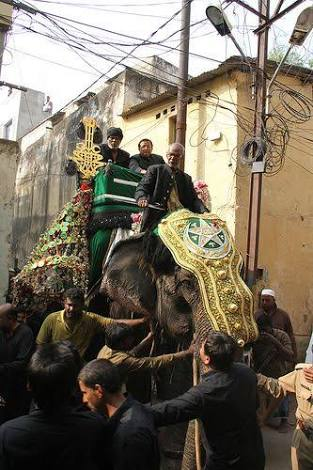
bibi ka alam procession on elephant in Dabirpura, Old City (Hyderabad, India).

The historic ‘Bibi-ka-Alam’ taken out from the Ashoorkhana in Dabeerpura of old city is the star attraction of ‘Youm -e-Ashoora’, the tenth day of Muharram. It is also considered a living example of communal harmony for it draws people of different faiths.

Hundreds of barefoot and bare-chested mourners from more than 40 ‘anjumans’, including a few from various parts of the country form part of the procession. The procession starts around noon from Bibi-ka-Alawa and culminates at Chaderghat in the evening, covering a distance of about five kilometres.

En-route it stops for a brief period at the Ashoorkhana ‘Khadam-e-Rasool’ where the footprints of Muhammad are displayed. The next stop is the ‘Peeli gate, Purani Haveli, where one of the members of the Nizam's family offers a ‘dhatti’ to the alam. The third stop is the 'Alawa-e-Sartouq' near the Darulshifa playground. Here, women mourners are permitted inside the premises where a ‘matham’ is performed for a short period of time. The fourth stop is Azakhana Zehra, where a ‘dhatti’ is offered by a representative or member of the Nizam family.

It is believed that the practice of installing the alam is 434 years old, dating back to the Quli Qutb Shahi period. "For many centuries it was housed in a Qutb Shahi Aashoorkhana near Golconda Fort, but later was shifted to Bibi ka Alawa," Syed Hamed Hussain Jaffery, president of Andhra Pradesh Shia Youth Conference says.

The important characteristic of the alam is that it is believed to contain a wooden plank on which Bibi Fatima, daughter of Muhammad, was given the final ablution. It also has six diamonds and other jewellery gifted by the VII Nizam, Mir Osman Ali Khan, in the 1950s.

Initially, the alam was carried upon an elephant named Hyderi, and now this job is done by Rajani, its calf. For some years another elephant, Hashmi, also carried the Alam. Rajani is also used during the Bonalu procession in the old city.
