= Khubani ka meetha =

Hyderabadi dessert made from dried apricots

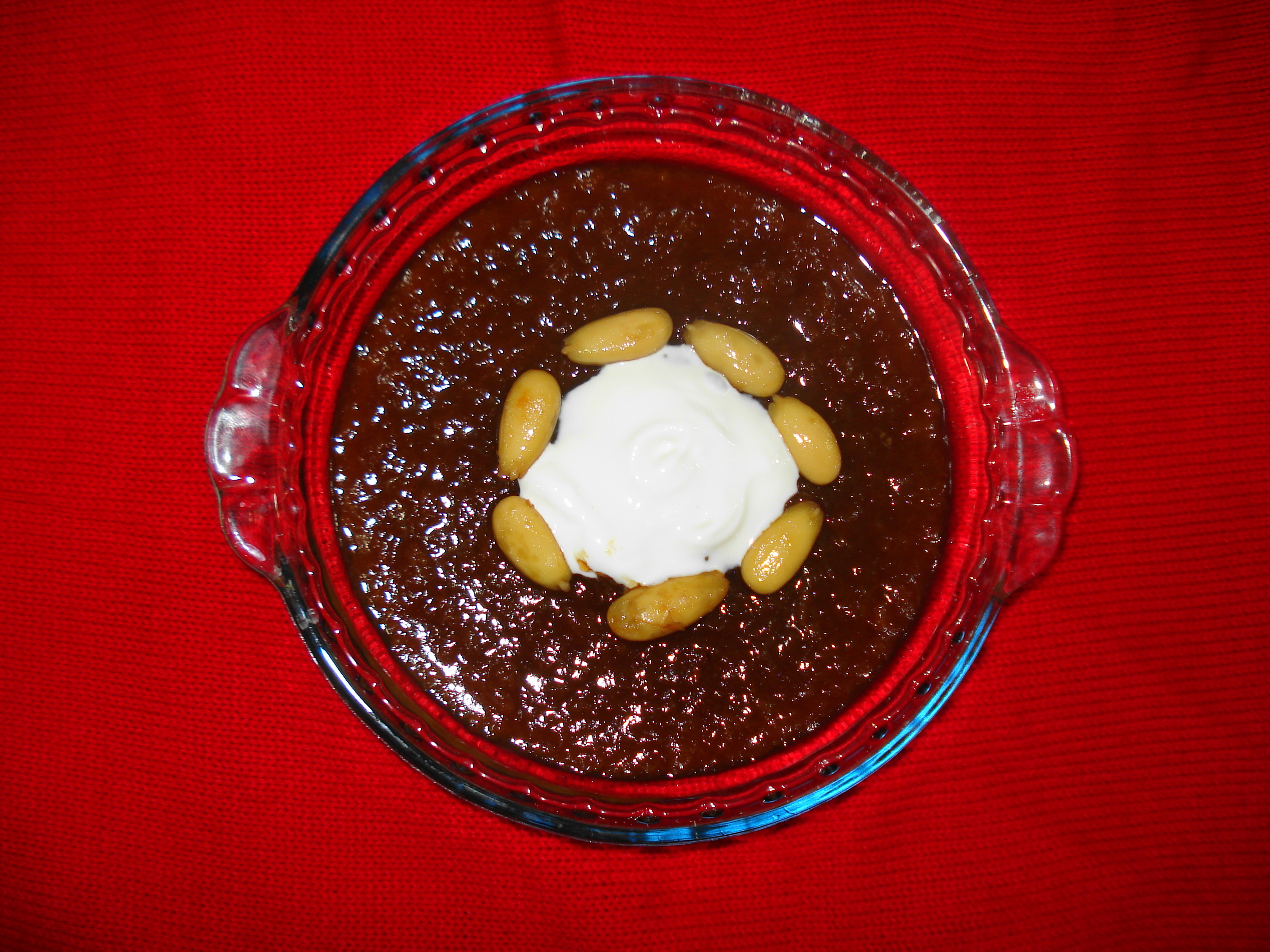
- Region or state: Hyderabad
- Main ingredients: Apricots, blanched almonds, kewra/gulab jal, cream

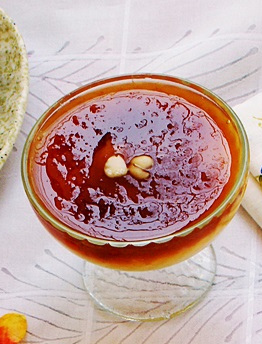
Qubani ka Meetha

Khubani ka meetha or qubani ka meetha is a dessert made from dried apricots, originating from Hyderabad, India. It is a part of Hyderabadi cuisine and is a common feature at Hyderabadi weddings.

== History ==
Khubani or khobani (خوبانی) is Urdu for apricot; it is believed that apricots were introduced to India by Central Asians.

== Ingredients ==
Dried apricots from Afghanistan are especially prized for their flavour. Khubani ka meetha is a very popular dessert of India's Hyderabadi cuisine.

Preparation of the dish involves boiling apricots with syrup until they assume the consistency of a thick soup or compote. The dessert is topped with blanched almonds or apricot kernels, and is traditionally garnished with malai (extra thick cream, ideally from buffalo milk), but also with custard or ice cream. The dessert is normally served hot with malai.

== See also ==
- Double ka meetha
