= Mirchi ka salan =

Indian chilli and peanut curry

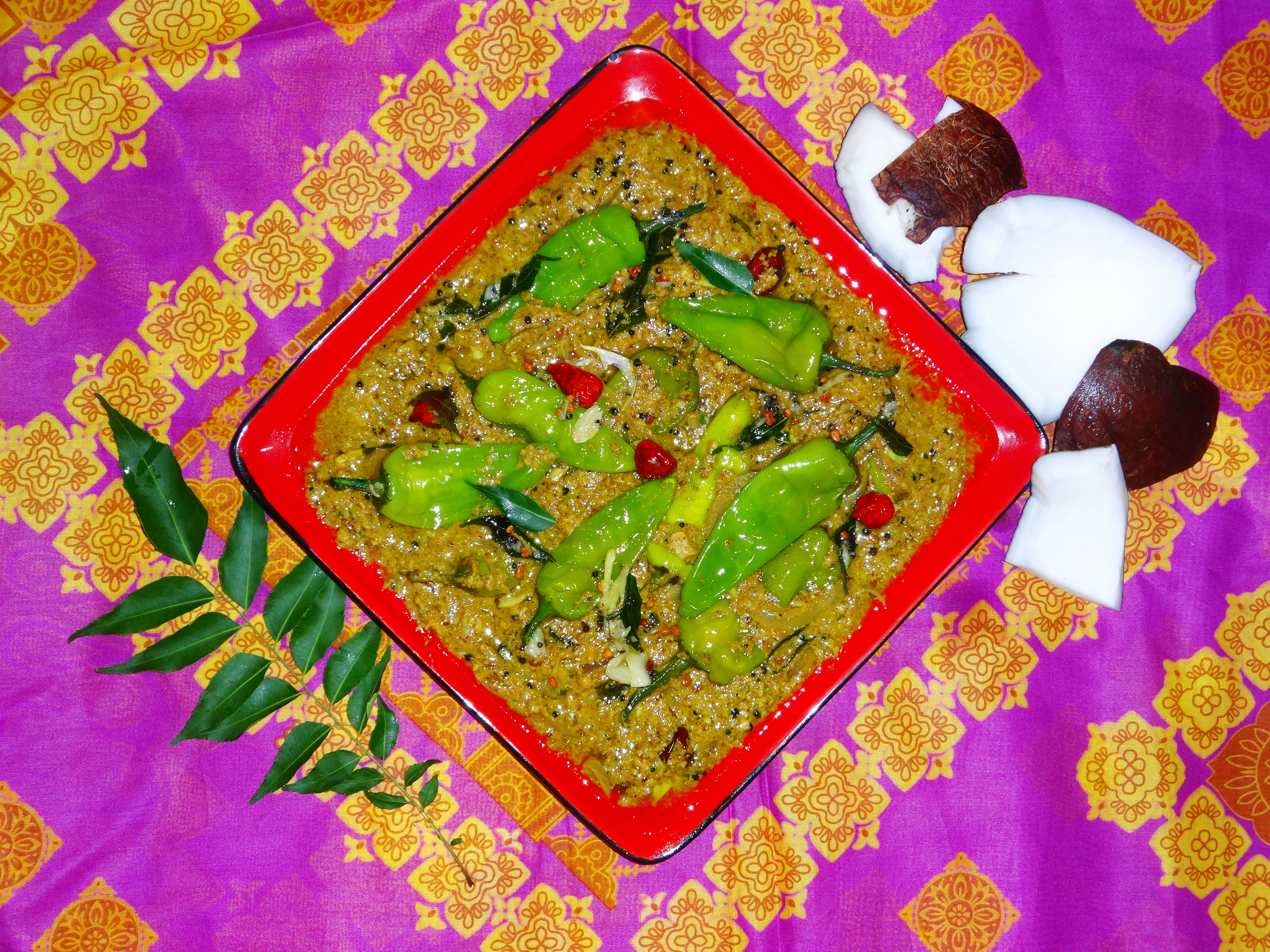
- Hyderabadi hari mirchi ka salan
- Place of origin: India
- Region or state: Hyderabad
- Associated cuisine: Indian
- Main ingredients: Green chilli peppers, peanuts, cumin seeds, spices

Mirchi ka salan (Urdu: مرچی کا سالن), or curried chilli peppers, is an Indian chilli and peanut curry from Hyderabad, Telangana, India, that usually accompanies Hyderabadi biryani alongside dahi chutney. The dish contains green chilli peppers, peanuts, sesame seeds, dry coconut, cumin seeds, ginger and garlic paste, turmeric powder, bay leaf, and thick tamarind juice.

Mirchi ka salan is a traditional Hyderabadi dish prepared for weddings and special occasions. It is a spicy dish served with rice (either plain or spiced, like biryani rice) or chapati. The mirchi (chilli peppers) are cooked in spices and mixed with a ground peanut paste which gives the dish a grainy texture. Sometimes the chillies can also be substituted with tomatoes (tamatey in Urdu) and eggplant (baigan in Urdu), which then becomes tamatey ka salan and baigan ka salan respectively.

== See also ==
- Hyderabadi cuisine
- List of condiments
- List of peanut dishes
