= Biryani =

Rice-based dish from South Asia

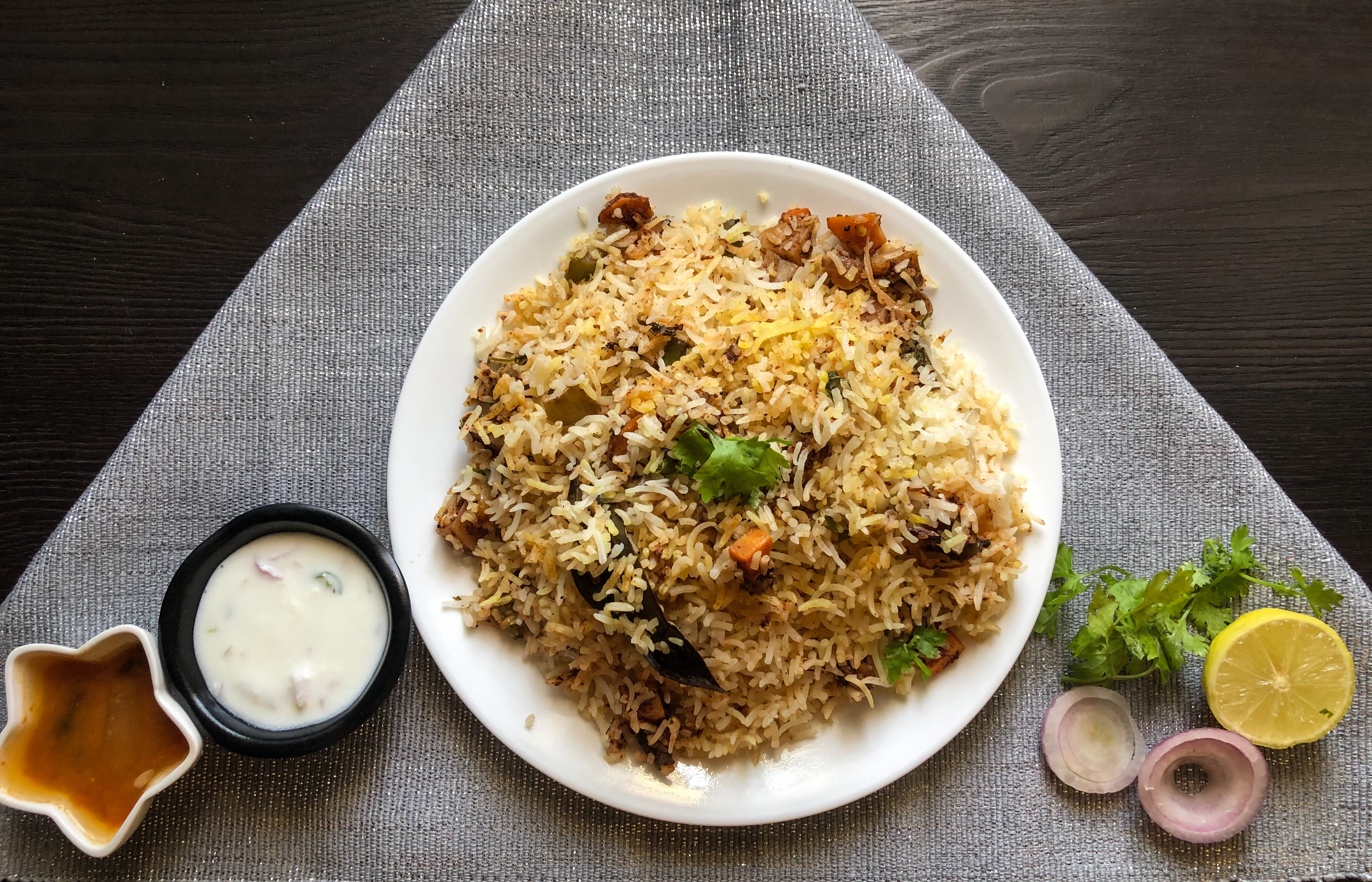
- Hyderabad-style biryani
- Course: Main dish
- Region or state: South Asia
- Serving temperature: Hot
- Main ingredients: Meat; Rice; Spices; Yoghurt (curd)

Biryani is a mixed rice dish traditionally made with spiced meat, seafood, or vegetables. It was present in Mughal-era India, though whether it was created there is debated. It is thought to derive from a Persian rice dish, either pilau or birinj biryan. The dish makes use of slow-cooking as in Persian pilau, combined with Persian-style yoghurt-marinated meat and a spicy Indian style of cooking; it was likely developed in the Mughal court kitchens. It is also possible that biryani was brought to South India before the Mughal era, or that pilau was brought to India and biryani was developed from it before being adopted by the Mughals.

Biryani is one of the most popular dishes in South Asia and among the South Asian diaspora. The dish is often associated with the region's Muslim population in particular, but is nevertheless a mainstream culinary staple embraced by every demographic. Similar dishes are prepared in many other countries, often with local variations, and often brought there by South Asian diaspora populations. Biryani is the most-ordered dish on Indian online food ordering and delivery services, is used in weddings and celebrations throughout the region, and has been described as the most popular dish in India.

== Etymology ==
The word biryani (Hindi: बिरयानी, Urdu: بریانی) is derived from biryan or beriyan (Persian: بریان), which means "to fry" or "to roast", said by Merriam-Webster probably to be related to Sanskrit: भृज्जति bhṛjjati, with the same meaning. The usage is from the Persian phrase birinj biryan (with Persian: برنج birinj, "rice"), meaning "fried rice".

== Origin ==
=== Historical sources ===
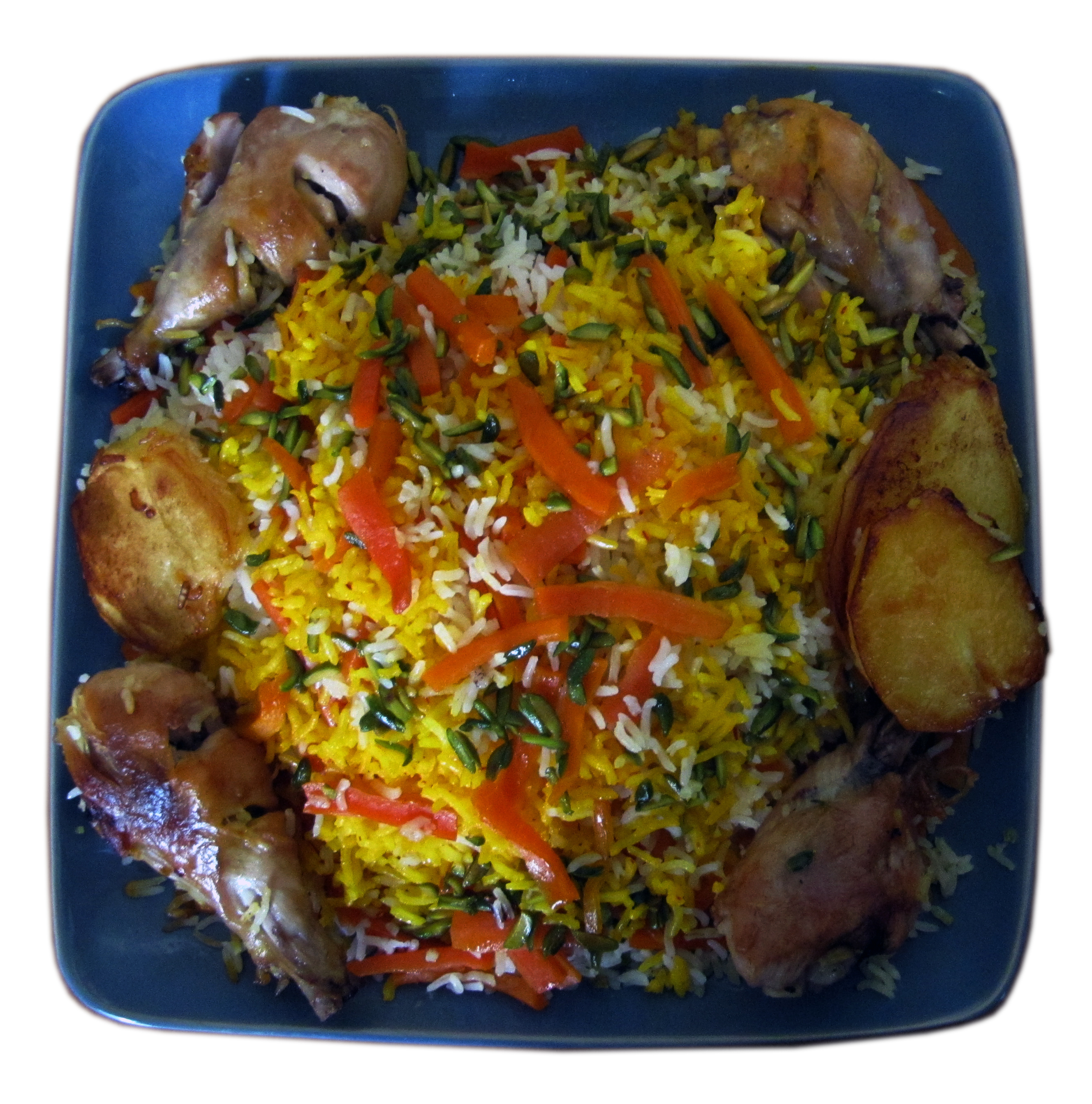
A modern Persian pilau, havij plo (Persian: هویج پلو, "carrot rice") with rice grains cooked to remain separate and in different colours. Pilau may be an ancestor of biryani.

The Mughal text Ain-i-Akbari (written 1589–1596), from the time of the emperor Akbar, mentions two rice dishes, pilau and biryani, listing ingredients with required quantities for each:

Secondly, [dishes] in which meat and rice, &c., are used ... 2. Duzdbiryán. 10 s[eer] rice, 3½ s. g'hí; 10 s. meat; ½ s. salt: this gives five dishes. 3. Qimah Paláo. Rice and meat as in the preceding; 4 s. g'hí; 1 s. peeled gram; 2 s. onions; ½ s. salt; ¼ s. fresh ginger, and pepper; cuminseed, cardamums and cloves, 1 d[han]. of each: this gives five dishes. (Note: A seer was a measure of weight, varying by region, but around 1 kg; a māshā was around 2 grams; and a dhan was around 50 milligrams (the weight of one wheat berry).)

The Ain-i-Akbari further names a dish of spiced mutton as a biryani, this time without mentioning rice:

Thirdly, meats with spices... Biryán. For a whole Dashmandi sheep, take 2 s[eer] salt; 1 s[eer] g'hí; 2 m[āshā] saffron, cloves, pepper, cuminseed: it is made in various ways."

Mughal biryani timeline
Period/Emperor	Dates	Event
(Timur)	(1370–1405)	(No record of it in Central Asia at that time)
Akbar	1556–1605	Mention of recipes in Ain-i-Akbari (1589–1596)
Shah Jahan	1628–1658	Brief description by Sebastien Manrique in 1641
Aurangzeb	1658–1707	Mention in letters to his son, Bahadur Shah I
Bahadur Shah Zafar	1837–1857	Recipe
Key: () and red background: Unrecorded

The Portuguese priest Sebastien Manrique described rice dishes on sale in the tent-city of the next Mughal emperor Shah Jahan as he travelled to Lahore in 1641. Manrique distinguished "Persian" pilau from "Mogol" biryani:

Among these dishes the principal and most substantial were the rich and aromatic Mogol Bringes [biryanis] (Note: See 'Etymology' above on birinj.) and Persian pilaos of different hues".

The dish is mentioned, too, in letters of the emperor Aurangzeb to his son. For example:

Exalted son, I remember the savour of your 'khichidi' and 'biryani' during the winter. Truly the 'kabuli' cooked by Islam Khan does not surpass them (in point of relish and savour). I wanted to have from you (in my service) Saliman, who cooks 'biryani'; but you did not allow him to serve as my cook. If you happen to find a pupil of his, skilful in the art of cookery, you will send him to me.

According to the historian Rana Safvi, the earliest actual recipe is from the later Mughal period, from Bahadur Shah Zafar's time.

=== Analysis ===
Diagram of Lizzie Collingham's analysis of the origin of biryani, proposing that in the time of the Mughals, specifically the emperor Akbar, Persian pilau was adapted to include Persian-style yoghurt-marinated meat and spicy Indian styles of cooking rice.

The historian of food Lizzie Collingham writes that the modern biryani developed in India (Hindustan) in the royal kitchens of the Mughal Empire, specifically during the rule of the emperor Akbar (1556–1605), and is a mix of the native spicy rice dishes of South Asia, Persian yoghurt-marinated meat, and the Persian pilau style of garnished rice. Collingham writes that "in the kitchens [of the Mughal court]... the delicately flavoured Persian pilau met the pungent and spicy rice dishes of Hindustan to create the classic Mughlai dish, biryani".

The cookery writer Pratibha Karan states that biryani is of Indian origin, derived from pilau which Muslim traders and invaders brought with them. She speculates that pilau was an army dish in medieval India. Armies would prepare a one-pot dish of rice with any available red meat. Over time, the dish became biryani due to different methods of cooking.

In the view of the historian of Islamic cuisine Salma Hussein and others, biryani came to South Asia from Persia before the Mughal era, most probably arriving in South India's Deccan region, brought by travelling soldier-statesmen and pilgrims. It has also been suggested that the dish was introduced from Persia by the Mughals. Another variant theory, that biryani came to India with Timur's invasion, appears to be incorrect because there is no record of biryani having existed in his native region of Central Asia during that period.

The historian of food K. T. Achaya states that pilau is "of older usage in India" than biryani, indicating that it could have been a precursor of biryani. Achaya notes that ancient and early medieval Indian texts such as the Mahabharata described rice cooked with meat. He further references early Tamil literature from the Sangam era (c. 300 BCE–300 CE), describing rice cooked with "fatted meat" or ghee. However, according to Ashis Nandy, Colleen Taylor Sen, and Charles Perry, despite having similar names, these dishes referenced in ancient Indian texts were distinct from both pulao and biryani. Later, K.T. Achaya himself conceded that, despite the linguistic similarity, these dishes referenced in ancient Indian texts were not the same as the medieval pulao.

Biryani evidently has some connection with Persia, but commentators disagree on what that might be. Birinj biryan is a Persian phrase meaning "fried rice", and the Mughals had biryani by the reign of Akbar in the 16th century, attested in the Ain-i-Akbari. Evidence: 1: folk theory 2: Kris Dhillon 3: Salma Hussein 4,5: Pratibha Karan 6: Lizzie Collingham

== Ingredients ==
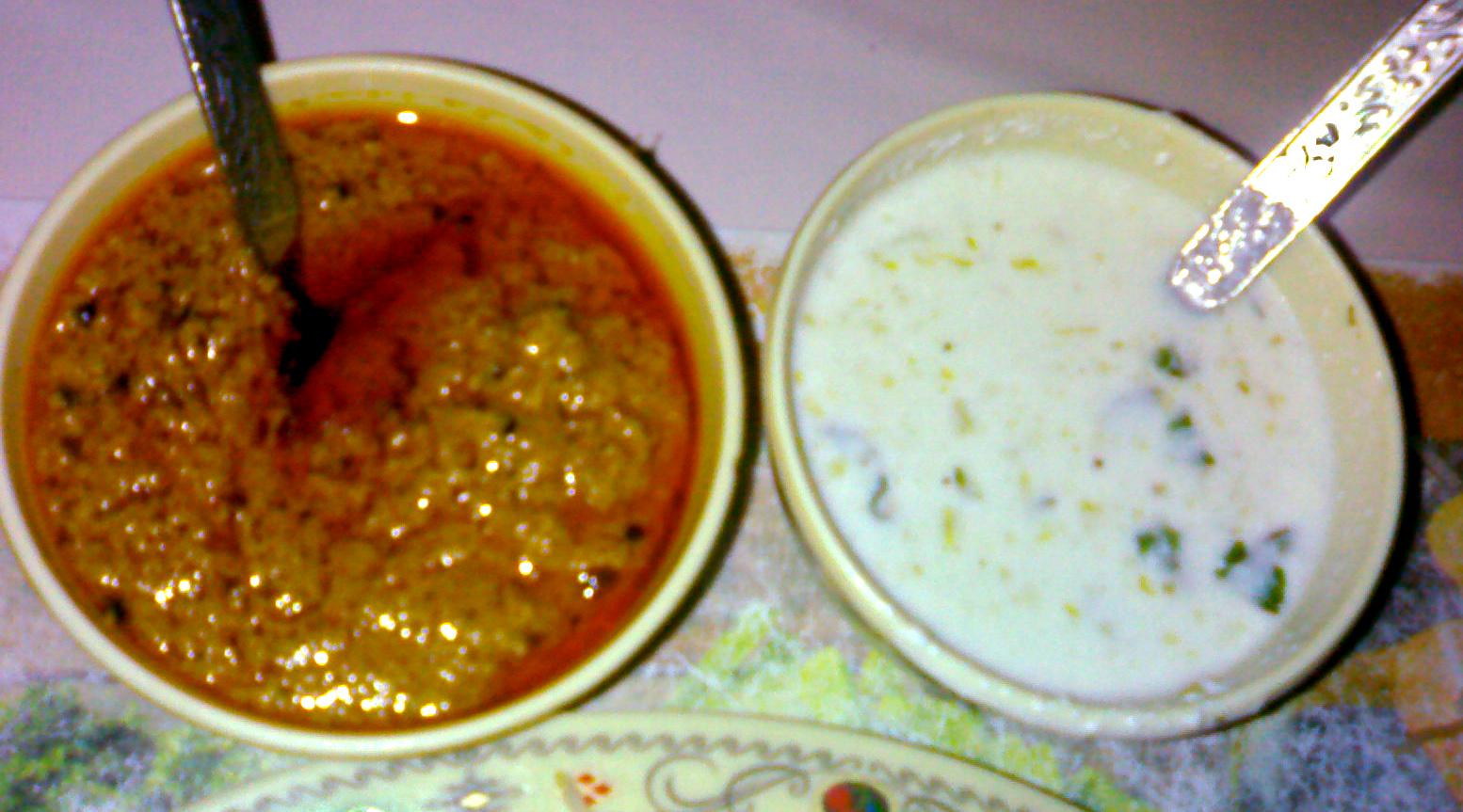
Biryani can be accompanied by side dishes such as mirchi ka salan and raita.

Ingredients for biryani vary according to the region and the type of meat and vegetables used. Meat (chicken, goat, beef) is the prime ingredient with rice. Seafood (fish, prawns) and vegetables are sometimes added. Navratan biryani tends to use sweeter, richer ingredients such as cashews, sultanas (kishmish), and fruits such as apple and pineapple.

The spices and condiments used in biryani may include fennel seeds, ghee (clarified butter), nutmeg, mace,black pepper, cloves, green cardamom, black cardamom, cinnamon, bay leaves, coriander, mint, ginger, onions, tomatoes, red chillies, star anise, turmeric, coriander, cumin, milk, yoghurt and garlic. The premium varieties include saffron. Some commercial recipes for biryani include aromatic essences such as mitha attar, kewra and rose water. Dried sour prunes (alu bukhara) may be added. In nasi briyani and other variants made in Southeast Asian countries such as Malaysia, Singapore, and Indonesia, local spices and aromatics such as pandan leaf may be added.

Biryani may be served with side dishes such as raita (yoghurt with cucumber, tomato, etc), fried or curried aubergine (brinjal), salad, or a curried side such as ande ka salan (with boiled eggs) or mirchi ka salan (with chili peppers).

Dietary variations include adding eggs, potatoes, and substituting meat with paneer, soyabean or vegetables, especially in Hindu or non-religious vegetarian variants. Kolkata biryani, invented by Wajid Ali Shah in the 1850s, includes potato.

== Preparation styles ==
=== Pakki and kacchi biryani ===
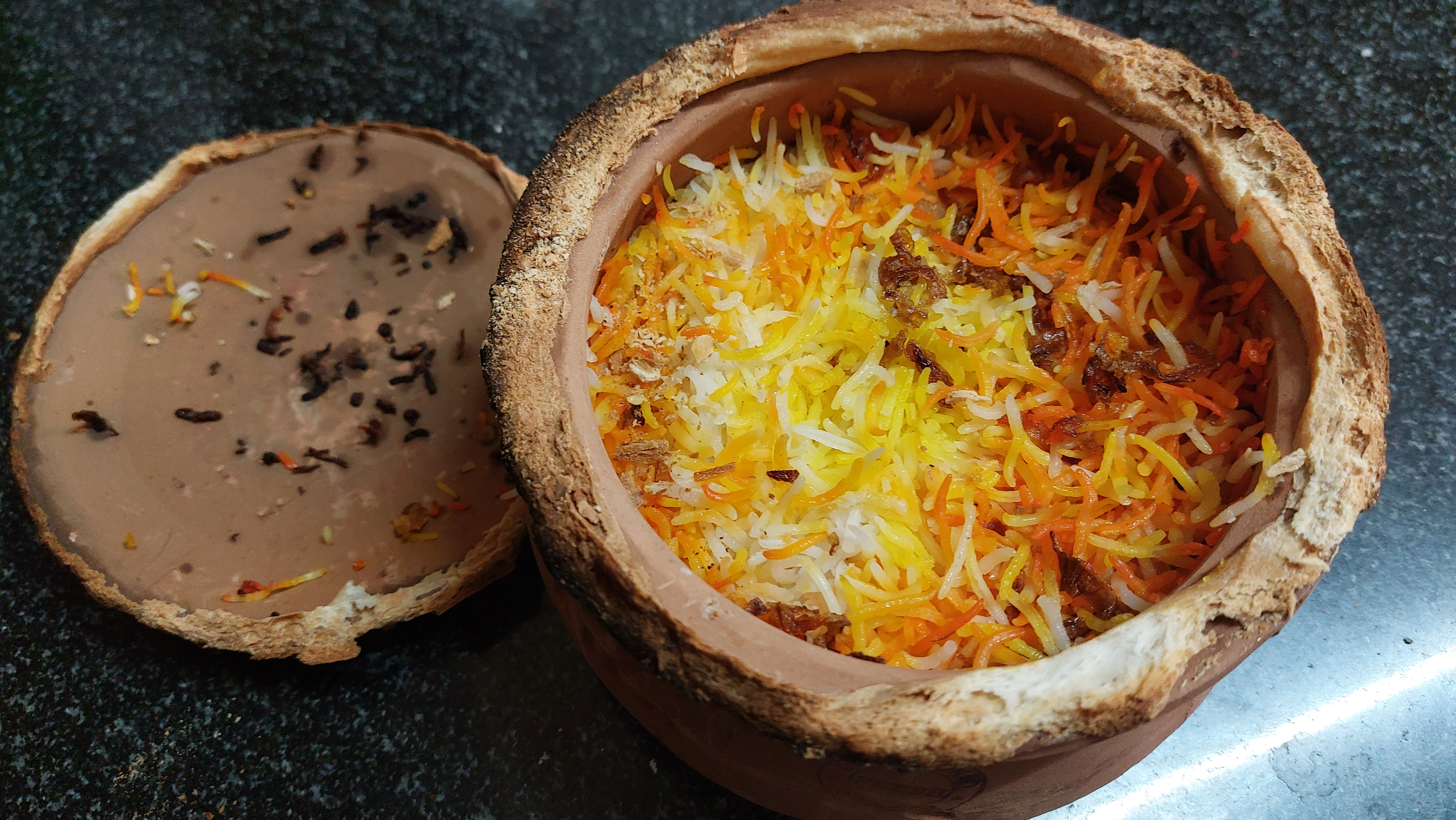
Lucknowi style mutton kacchi biryani cooked in a clay pot sealed with dough. The dough seal is broken after cooking.

Biryani can be cooked using one of two techniques, pakki ("cooked") and kacchi ("raw"). In a pakki biryani, the ingredients are cooked separately (at least in part) and then arranged in layers. The different layers can be individually coloured and flavoured with a brightly-coloured spice such as turmeric or saffron. In a kacchi biryani, layers are arranged in a pot which is then sealed and cooked slowly (Dum cooking) for the food to steam in its own liquid.

=== Difference between biryani and pilau ===
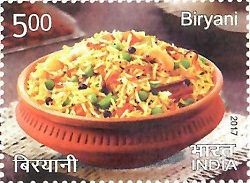
Biryani on a 2017 stamp of India

Pilau is a mixed rice dish popular in the South Asian, Central Asian, and Middle Eastern cuisine. Opinions differ on the differences between the dishes, if any.

The British-era author Abdul Halim Sharar mentions that biryani has a stronger curried taste due to a greater amount of spices. According to Delhi-based historian Sohail Hashmi, pilau tends to be plainer than biryani, and consists of meat or vegetables cooked with rice with the bottom layered with potatoes or onions. Biryani contains more gravy, and is often cooked longer, leaving the meat (and vegetables, if present) more tender, and the rice more flavoured. Biryani is cooked with additional dressings and often has a light layer of scorched rice at the bottom.

The cookery author Pratibha Karan states that while the terms are often applied arbitrarily, the main distinction is that a biryani consists of two layers of rice with a layer of meat (and vegetables, if present) in the middle, while the pilau is not layered. Further, in modern usage, biryani is the primary dish in a meal, while pilau is usually a secondary accompaniment to a larger meal; and biryanis have more complex and stronger spices than pilaus.

The translator and cookery author Colleen Taylor Sen notes that the difference has been extensively debated, that the dishes are both of long-grained rice with meat or vegetables, and are sometimes "almost impossible to tell apart". However, pilau is usually a side dish, biryani a "centre piece" with its own sides; and pilau is a one-pot dish, while biryani's rice and meat can be cooked separately.

== Varieties ==
=== In the Indian subcontinent ===
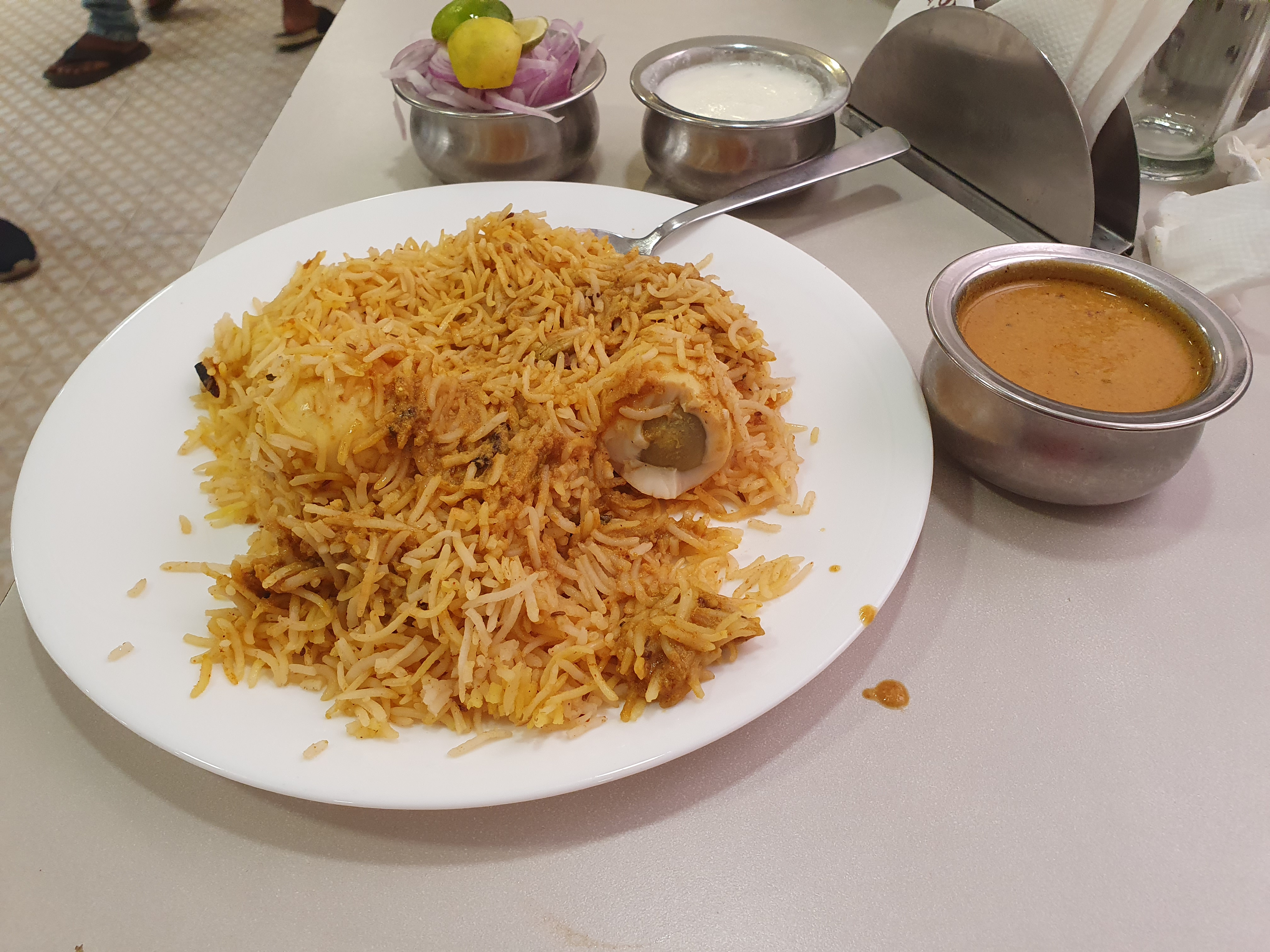
Hyderabadi egg biryani served with mirchi ka salan, raita and salad

There are many types of biryani in the Indian subcontinent. Biryani is the single most-ordered dish in Indian online food ordering and delivery services, and has been described as the most popular dish in India. The names of variants are often based on their region or city of origin. Some have taken the name of the shop that sells it, as in Fakhruddin Biriyani in Dhaka, Students biryani in Karachi, Lucky biryani in Bandra, Mumbai and Baghdadi biryani in Colaba, Mumbai. Biryanis are often specific to the Muslim communities where they originate; they are usually the defining dishes of those communities. In 2009, the Deccani Biryani Makers Association submitted 'Hyderabadi Biryani' for a geographical indication, but the attempt failed as they were unable to provide documentary evidence of its historical origin.

=== Outside the Indian subcontinent ===
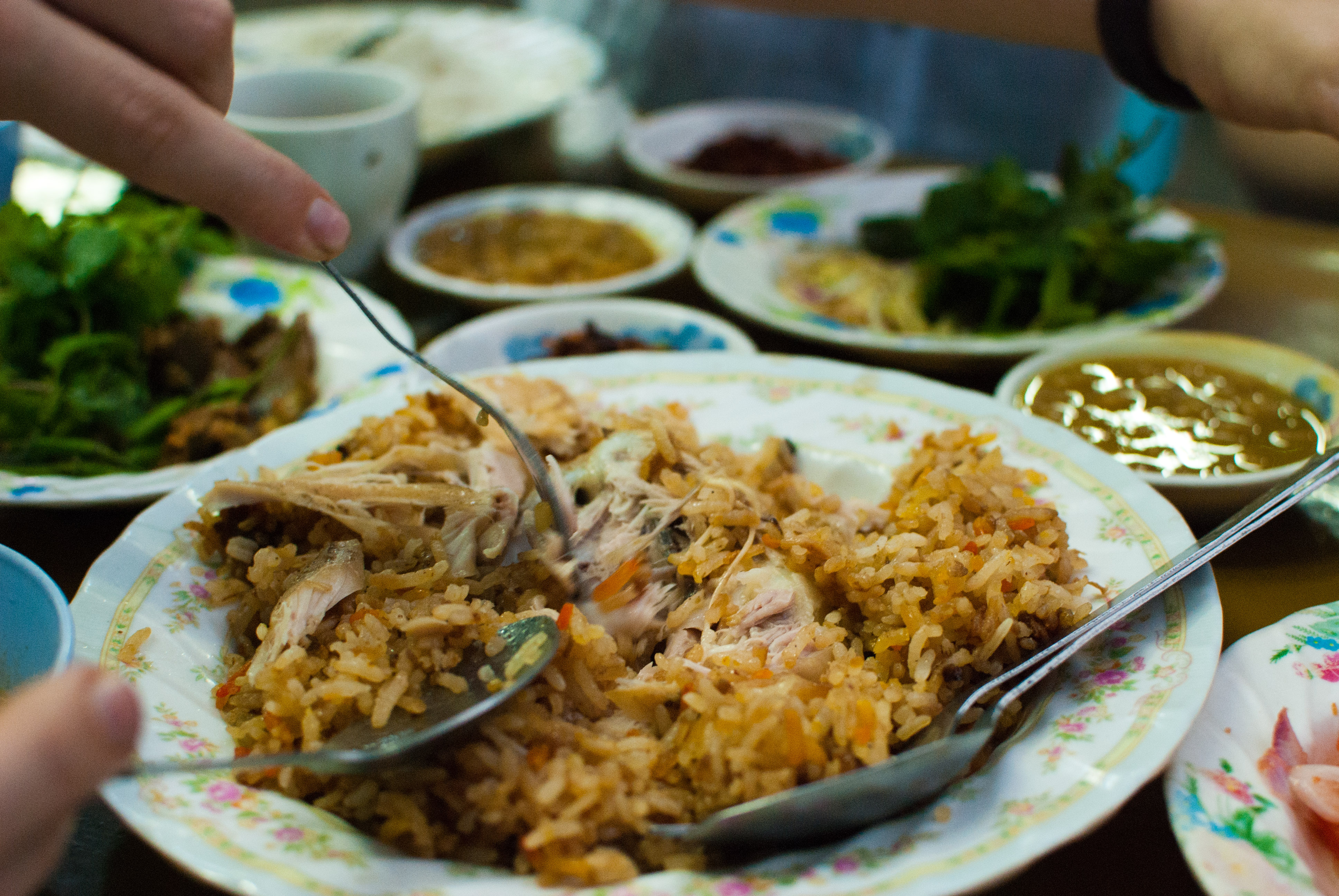
Burmese biryani (danpauk)

Varieties of biryani have arisen in many countries, and was often spread to such places by South Asian diaspora populations. For example in Myanmar, danpauk (ဒံပေါက်) is a mainstay at festive events such as weddings. On the Persian Gulf, biryani (Persian: برياني) is usually saffron-based with chicken, while in Indonesia nasi kebuli is an spicy steamed rice dish cooked in goat meat broth, milk and ghee. In Thailand the dish is known as khao mhok (Thai: ข้าวหมก), using chicken, beef or fish, topped with fried garlic and served with a green sour sauce.

== In culture ==
Biryani forms "the centrepiece of countless Indian holidays and weddings". In Bangladesh, kacchi biryani with mutton has been described as "the quintessential wedding dish" of Old Dhaka, largely replacing the murg (chicken) pulao that was favoured in the 20th century for special occasions across the subcontinent. The Muslim festival of Bakr Eid is marked by biryani at dinner, using the mutton from goats slaughtered in memory of the prophet Abraham, who had shown he was willing to sacrifice his own son.

Biryani is used across the Indian Subcontinent in celebrations. Annual biryani festivals have been held in cities such as Ambur, Islamabad and Karachi. South Asian diaspora populations have held their own festivals, for example by the North American Indian Muslim Association in North America. Biryani festivals have been held more widely in places such as Singapore and Qatar.

== See also ==
- List of rice dishes
