= South Asian cuisine =

Culinary traditions of South Asia

Orthographic projection of South Asia.

South Asian cuisine includes the traditional cuisines from the modern-day South Asian republics of Bangladesh, India, the Maldives, Nepal, Pakistan and Sri Lanka, also sometimes including the kingdom of Bhutan and the emirate of Afghanistan. Also sometimes known as Desi cuisine, it has been influenced by and also has influenced other Asian cuisines beyond the Indian subcontinent.

== Staples and common ingredients ==
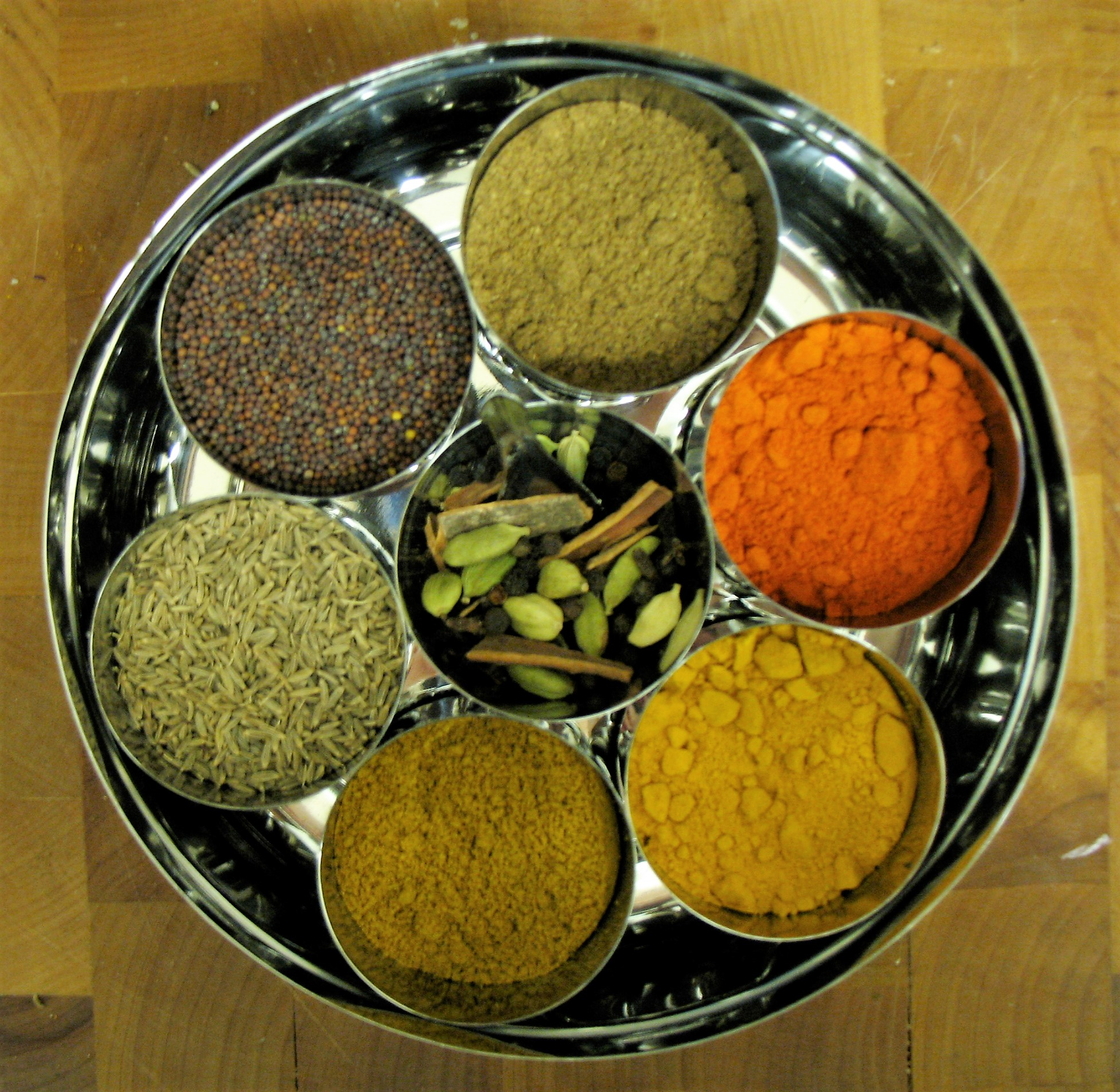
An assortment of spices and herbs. Spices are an indispensable food ingredient in much of the Indian subcontinent.

Chapati, a type of flat bread, is a common part of meals to be had in many parts of the Indian subcontinent. Other staples from many of the cuisines include rice, roti made from atta flour, and beans.

Foods in this area of the world are flavoured with various types of chilli, black pepper, cloves, and other strong herbs and spices, along with the flavoured butter ghee. Ginger is an ingredient that can be used in both savory and sweet recipes in cuisines from the subcontinent. Chopped ginger is fried with meat, and pickled ginger is often an accompaniment to boiled rice. Ginger juice and ginger boiled in syrup are used to make desserts. Turmeric and cumin are often used to make curries.

Common meats include goat, fish, chicken and beef. Beef is less common in India than in other South Asian cuisines because cattle have a special place in Hinduism. Prohibitions against beef extend to the meat of (water) buffalo and yaks to some extent. Lamb is common in certain regions but not always prominent. Pork is considered a taboo food item by all Muslims. However it is avoided by Hindus despite not being taboo, though it is commonly eaten in some regions like Northeast India and Goa. A variety of very sweet desserts which use dairy products is also found in the cuisines of the Indian subcontinent. The main ingredients in desserts of the Indian subcontinent are reduced milk, ground almonds, lentil flour, ghee and sugar. Kheer, a dairy-based rice pudding, is a common dessert.

== History ==
Many foods from the subcontinent have been known for over five thousand years. The Indus Valley people, who settled in the northwestern Indian subcontinent, hunted turtles and alligators. They also collected wild grains, herbs and plants. Many foods and ingredients from the Indus period (c. 3300–1700 B.C.) are still common today. Some foods consisted of wheat, barley, rice, tamarind, eggplant, and cucumber. The Indus Valley people cooked with oils, ginger, salt, green peppers, and turmeric root, which would be dried and ground into an orange powder.

Indians have used leafy vegetables, lentils, and milk products, such as-yogurt and ghee, throughout their history. They also used spices such as cumin and coriander. Black pepper, which is native to India, was often used by 400 A.D. The Greeks brought saffron and the Chinese introduced tea. The Portuguese and British made red chili, potato and cauliflower popular after 1700 A.D. The Mughals, who began arriving in India after 1200 A.D. , saw food as an art and many of their dishes were cooked with as many as 25 spices. They also used rose water, cashews, raisins, and almonds.

In the late 18th and early 19th century, an autobiography of the Scottish Robert Lindsay mentions a Sylheti man, called Saeed Ullah, cooking a curry for Lindsay's family. This is possibly the oldest record of Indian cuisine in the United Kingdom.

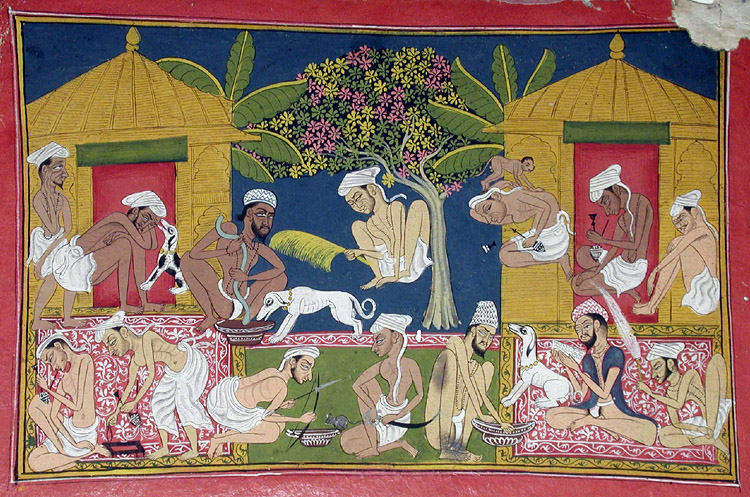
Bhang eaters from India c. 1790. Bhang is an edible preparation of cannabis native to the Indian subcontinent. It has been used in food and drink as early as 1000 BCE by Hindus in ancient India.

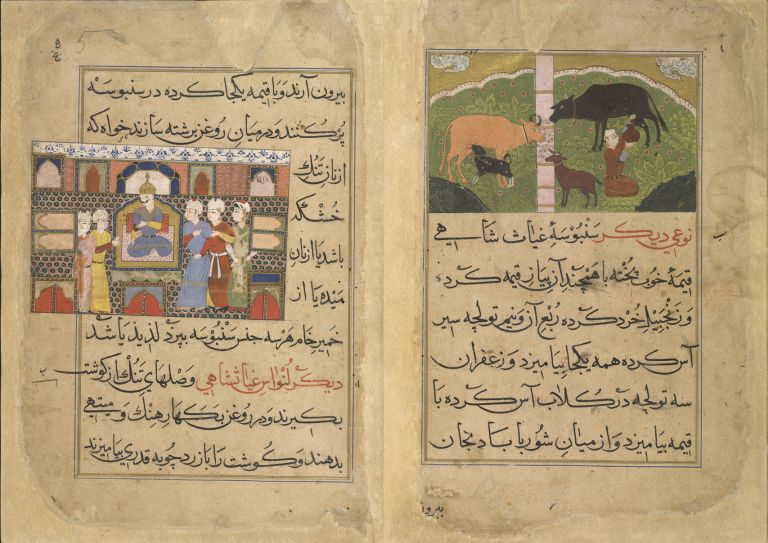
A page from the Nimatnama-i-Nasiruddin-Shahi, the book of delicacies and recipes. It documents the fine art of making kheer.

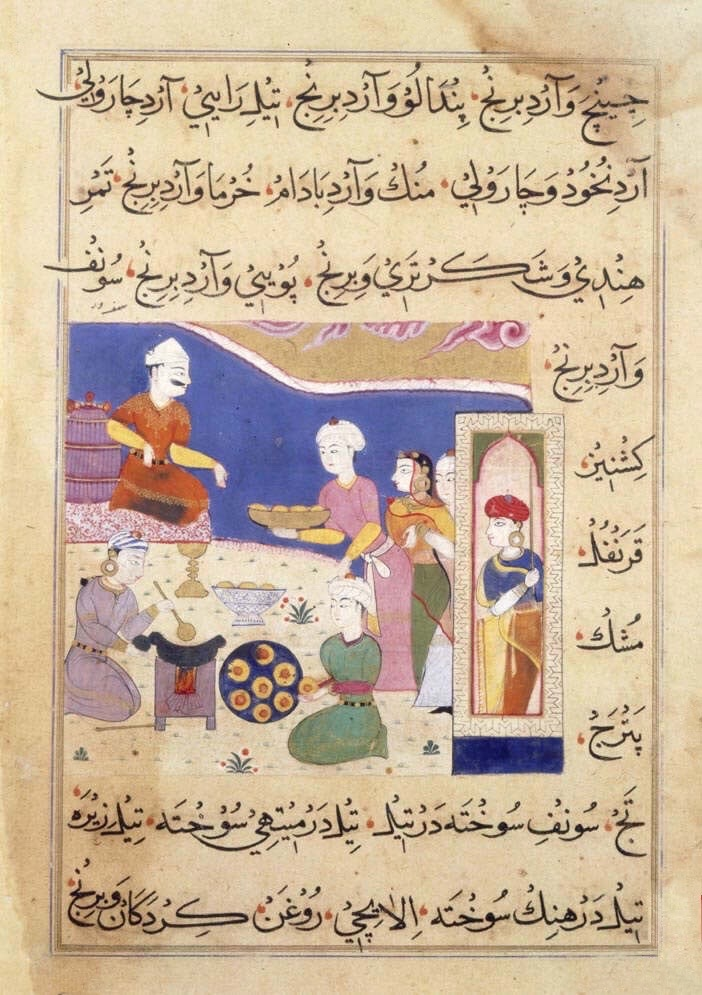
Medieval Indian Manuscript Nimatnama-i-Nasiruddin-Shahi (circa 16th century) showing samosas being served.

== By culture ==
=== Afghanistan ===
Afghan cuisine is influenced by Persian, Central Asian, and Indian cuisines due to Afghanistan's close proximity and cultural ties. The cuisine is halal and mainly based on lamb, beef, and poultry with rice and Afghan bread.

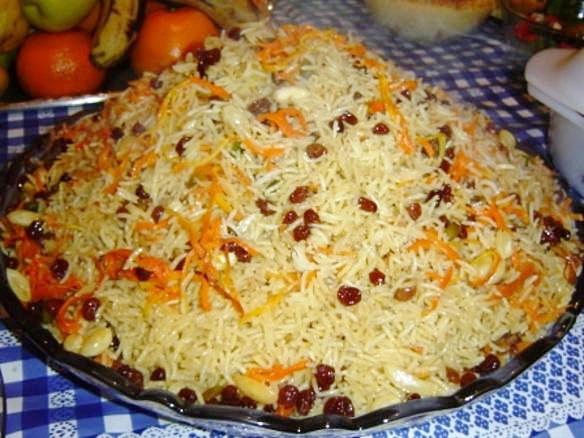
Afghan Kabuli palaw

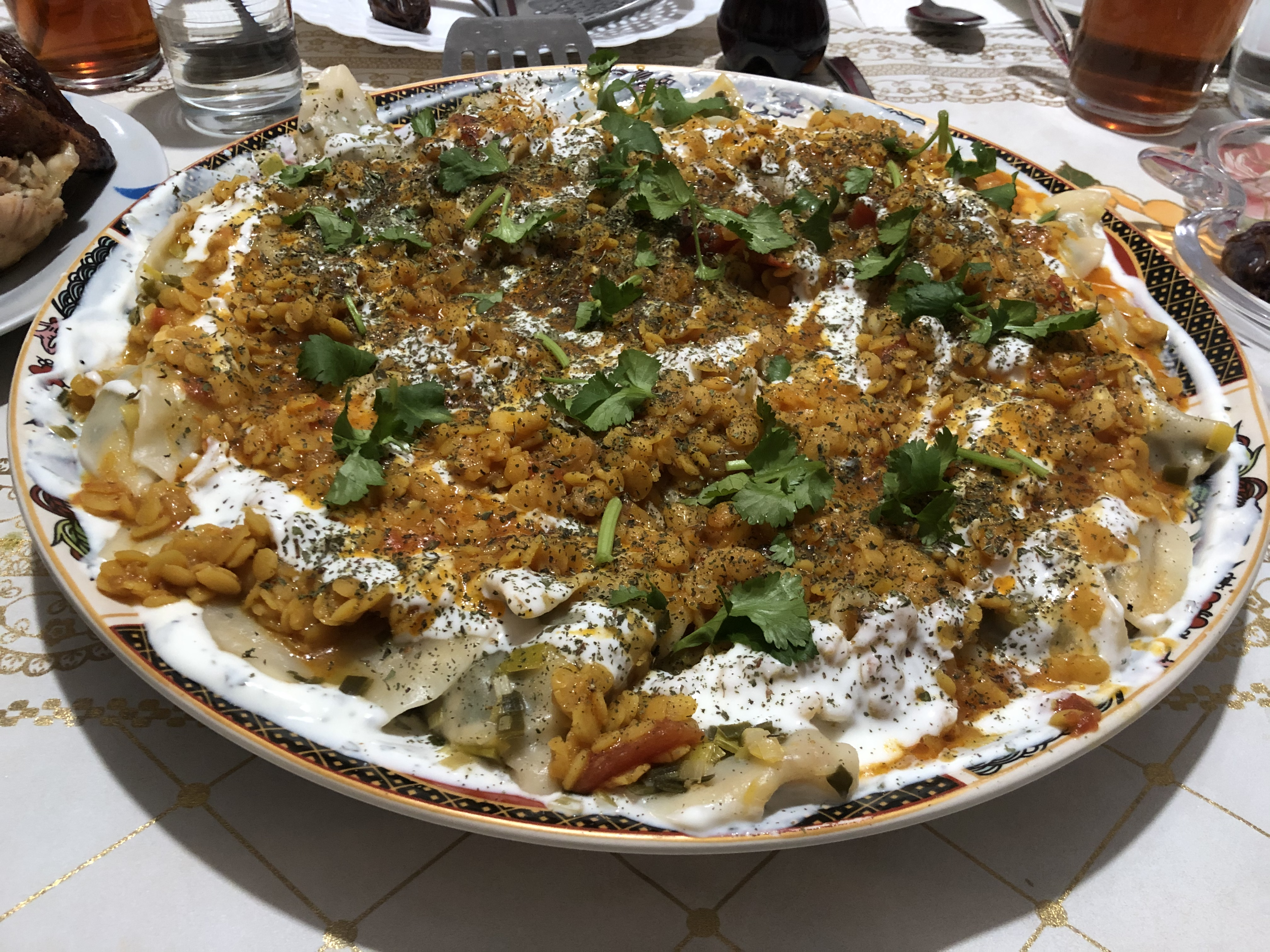
Afghan aushak

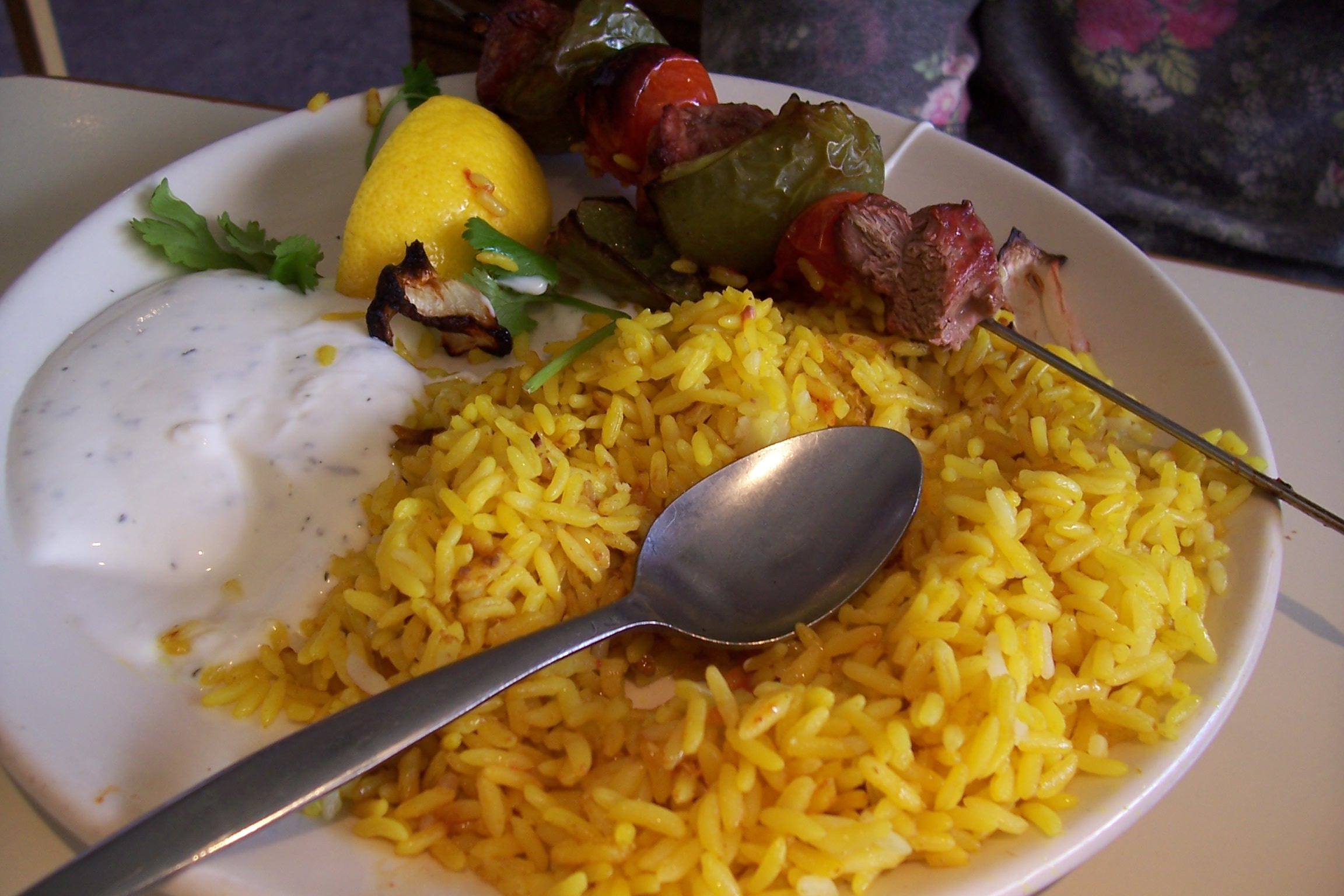
Afghan lamb kebab with yellow saffron rice

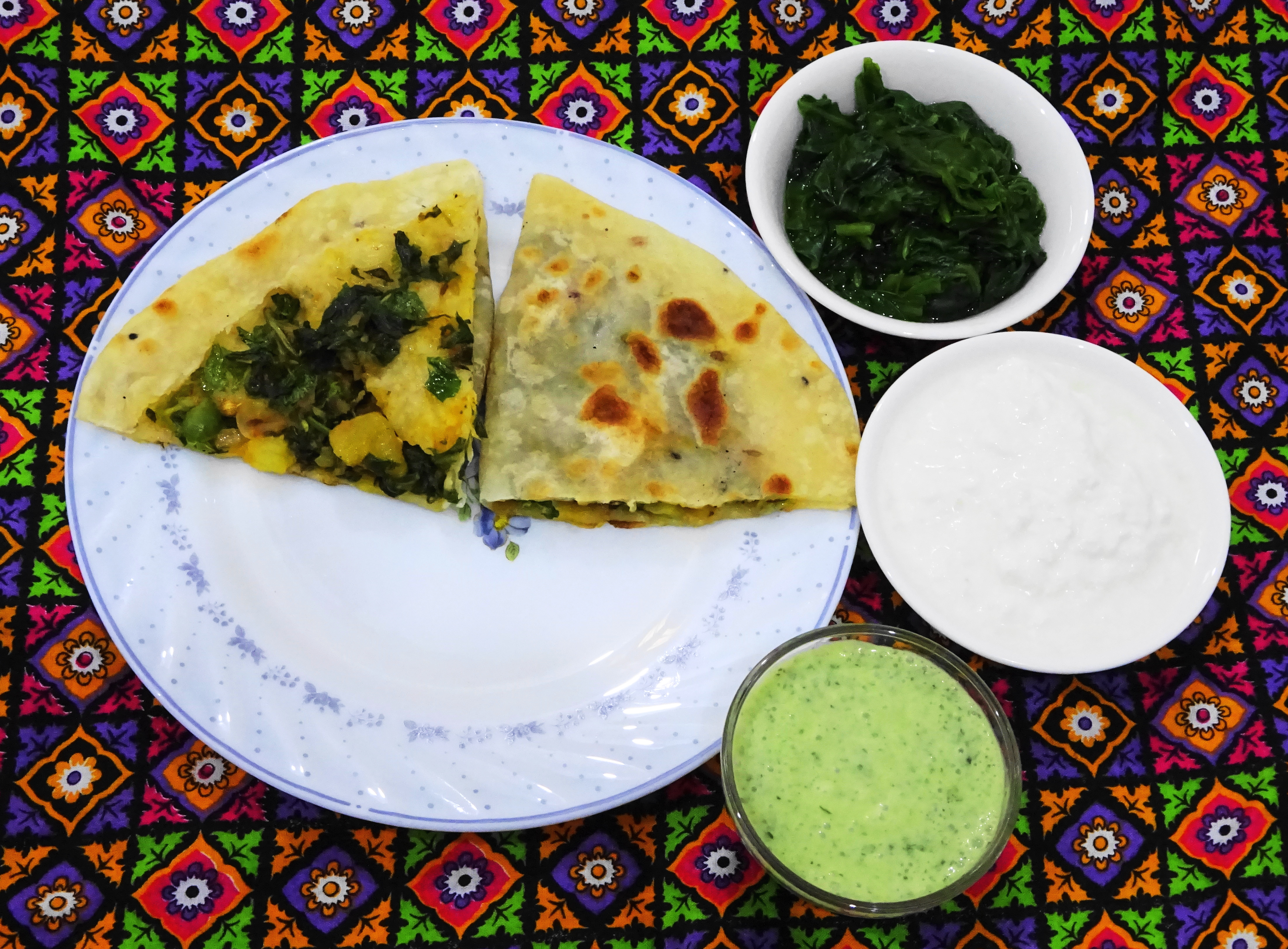
Bolani

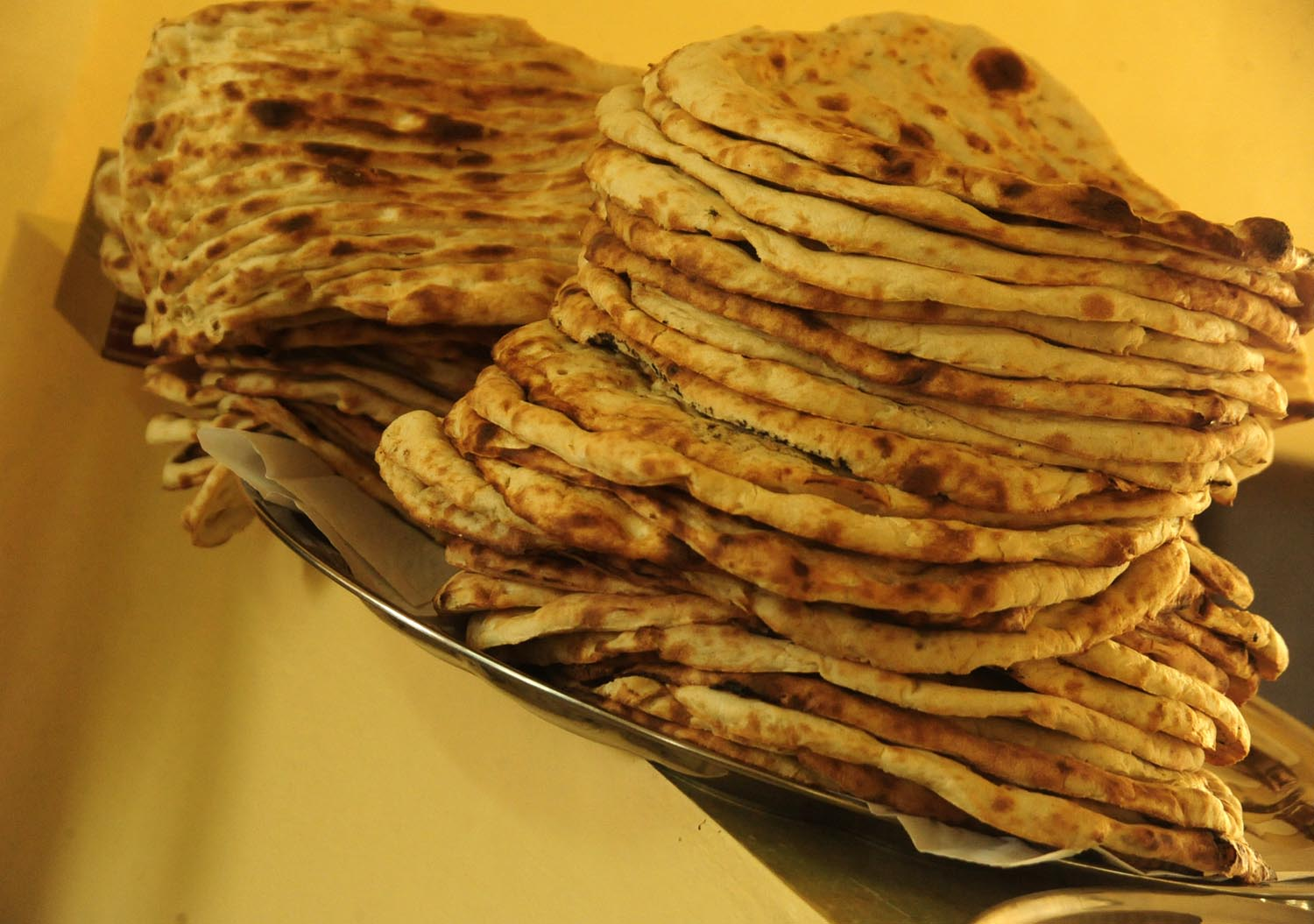
Naan (bread) from a local baker, the most widely consumed bread in Afghanistan

=== Bangladesh ===
Bangladeshi cuisine is dominated by Bengali cuisine and has been shaped by the diverse history and riverine geography of Bangladesh. The country has a tropical monsoon climate. Rice is the main staple food of Bangladeshi people and it is served with a wide range of curries.

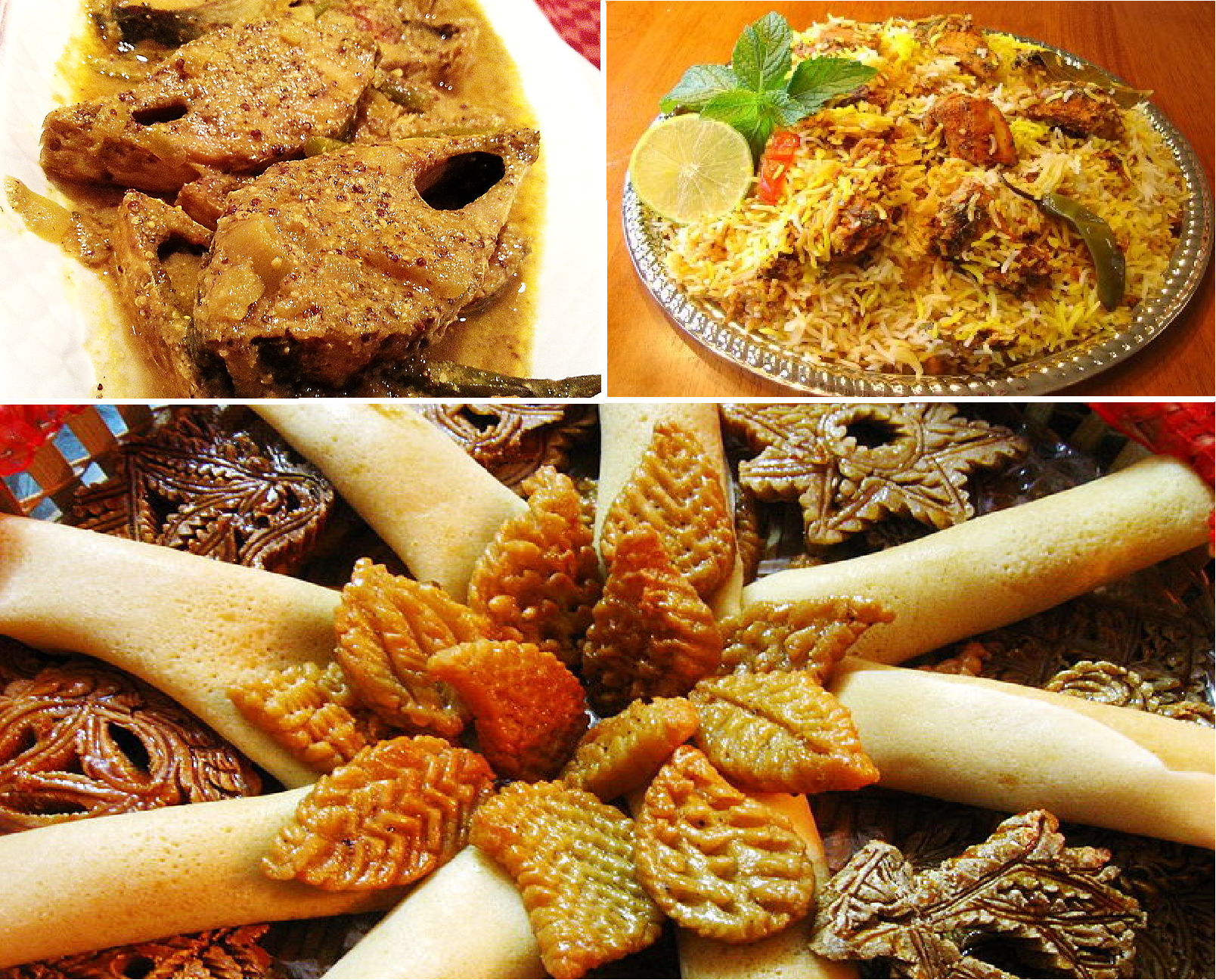
Traditional Bangladeshi Meal: Mustard seed Ilish Curry, Dhakai Biryani and Pitha

Bangladeshi dishes exhibit strong aromatic flavours; and often include eggs, potatoes, tomatoes and aubergines. A variety of spices and herbs, along with mustard oil and ghee, is used in Bangladeshi cooking. The main breads are naan, porota, roti, bakarkhani and luchi. Dal is the second most important staple food which is served with rice/porota/luchi. Fish is a staple in Bangladeshi cuisine, especially freshwater fish, which is a distinctive feature of the country's gastronomy. Major fish dishes include ilish (hilsa), pabda (butterfish), rui (rohu), pangash (pangas catfish), chitol (clown knifefish), magur (walking catfish), bhetki (barramundi) and tilapia. Meat consumption includes beef, goat, chicken, duck, and koel. Vegetable dishes, either mashed (bhorta), boiled (sabji), or leaf-based (saag), are widely served. Seafood such as lobster and shrimp are also often prevalent.

Islamic dietary laws are prevalent across Bangladesh. Halal foods are food items that Muslims are allowed to eat and drink under Islamic dietary guidelines. The criteria specifies both what foods are allowed, and how the food must be prepared. The foods addressed are mostly types of meat allowed in Islam. Bangladeshi people follow certain rules and regulations while eating. It includes warm hospitality and particular ways of serving as well. This is known as Bangaliketa (Bengali: বাঙালি কেতা). The culture also defines the way to invite people to weddings and for dinner. Gifts are given on certain occasions. Bangaliketa also includes a way of serving utensils in a proper manner. Bengali cuisine has the only traditionally developed multi-course tradition from the subcontinent that is analogous in structure to the modern service à la russe style of French cuisine, with food served course-wise rather than all at once.

=== Bhutan ===
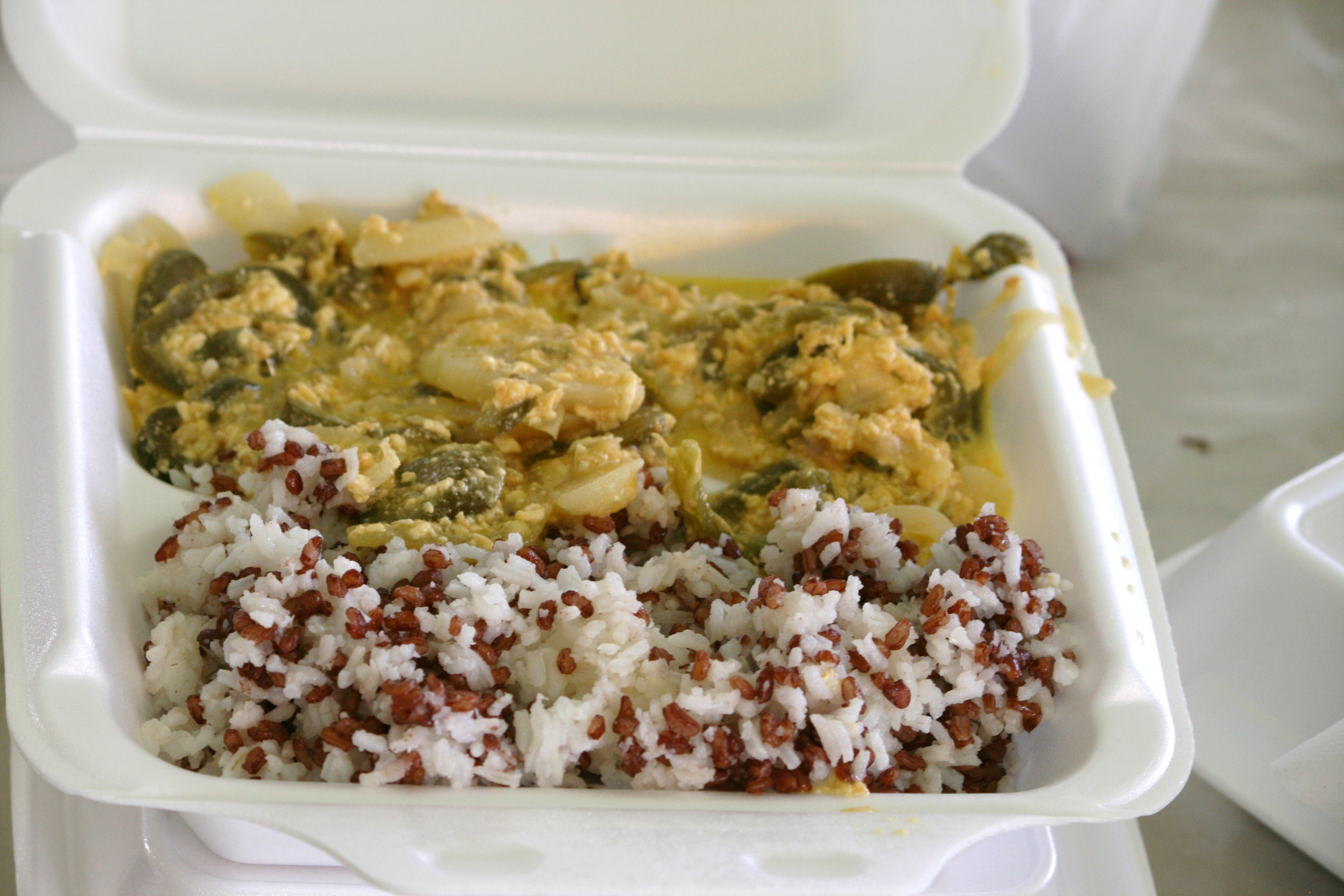
Bhutanese national dish Ema datshi (ཨེ་མ་དར་ཚིལ།) with rice (mix of Bhutanese red rice and white rice)

Bhutanese cuisine employs a lot of red rice (like brown rice in texture, but with a nutty taste, the only variety of rice that grows at high altitudes), buckwheat, and increasingly maize. The diet in the hills also includes chicken, yak meat, dried beef, pork, pork fat, and mutton. It has many similarities with Tibetan cuisine.

=== India ===
Indian cuisine is characterized by its sophisticated and subtle use of many Indian spices. There is also the widespread practice of vegetarianism across its society although, overall a minority. Indian cuisine is one of the world's most diverse cuisines, each family of this cuisine is characterized by a wide assortment of dishes and cooking techniques. As a consequence, Indian cuisine varies from region to region, reflecting its ethnically diverse demographics. India's religious beliefs and culture has played an influential role in the evolution of its cuisine. It has influences from Middle Eastern cuisine, Southeast Asian cuisine, East Asian cuisine and Central Asian cuisine, as well as the Mediterranean cuisines due to the historical and contemporary cross-cultural interactions with these neighboring regions.

Regional cuisine includes:

- East Indian cuisines:
  - Bengali cuisine
  - Cuisine of Chhattisgarh
  - Odia cuisine
  - Bhojpuri cuisine
  - Jharkhandi cuisine
  - Maithil cuisine
  - Bihari cuisine
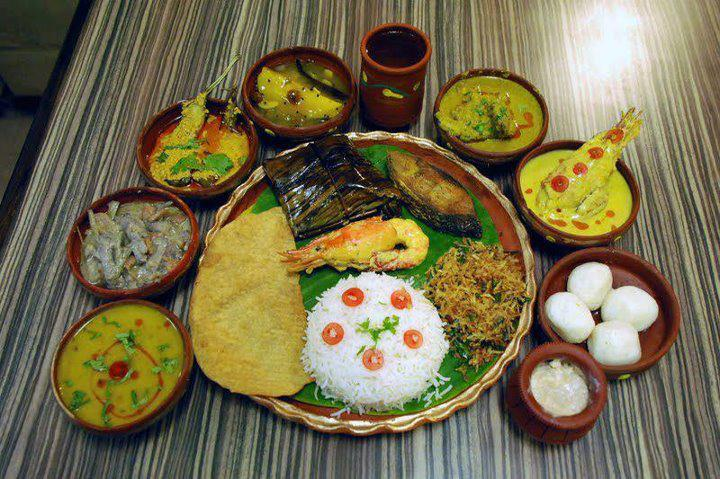
Bengali Fish meal

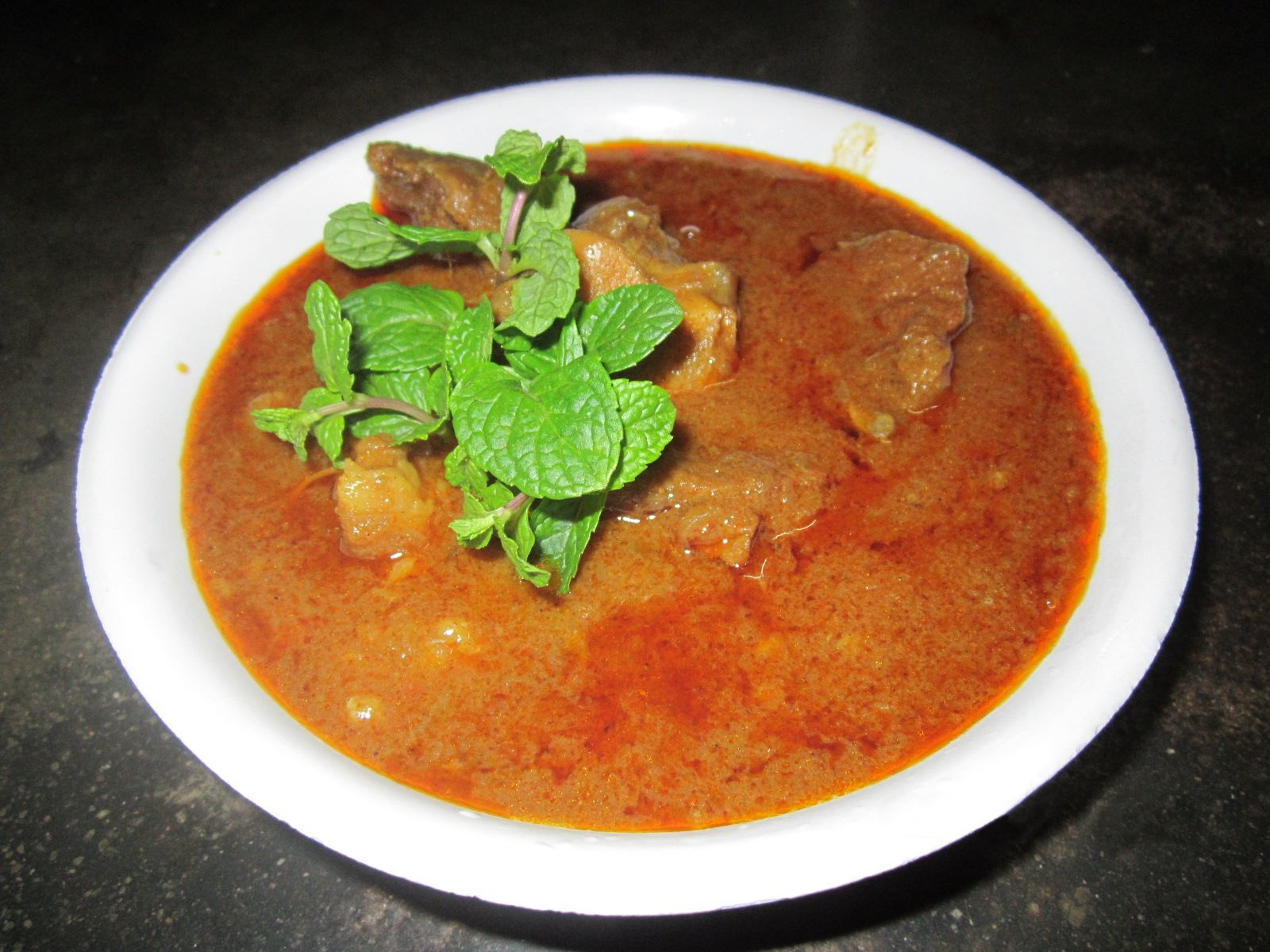
Odisha style Mutton Curry

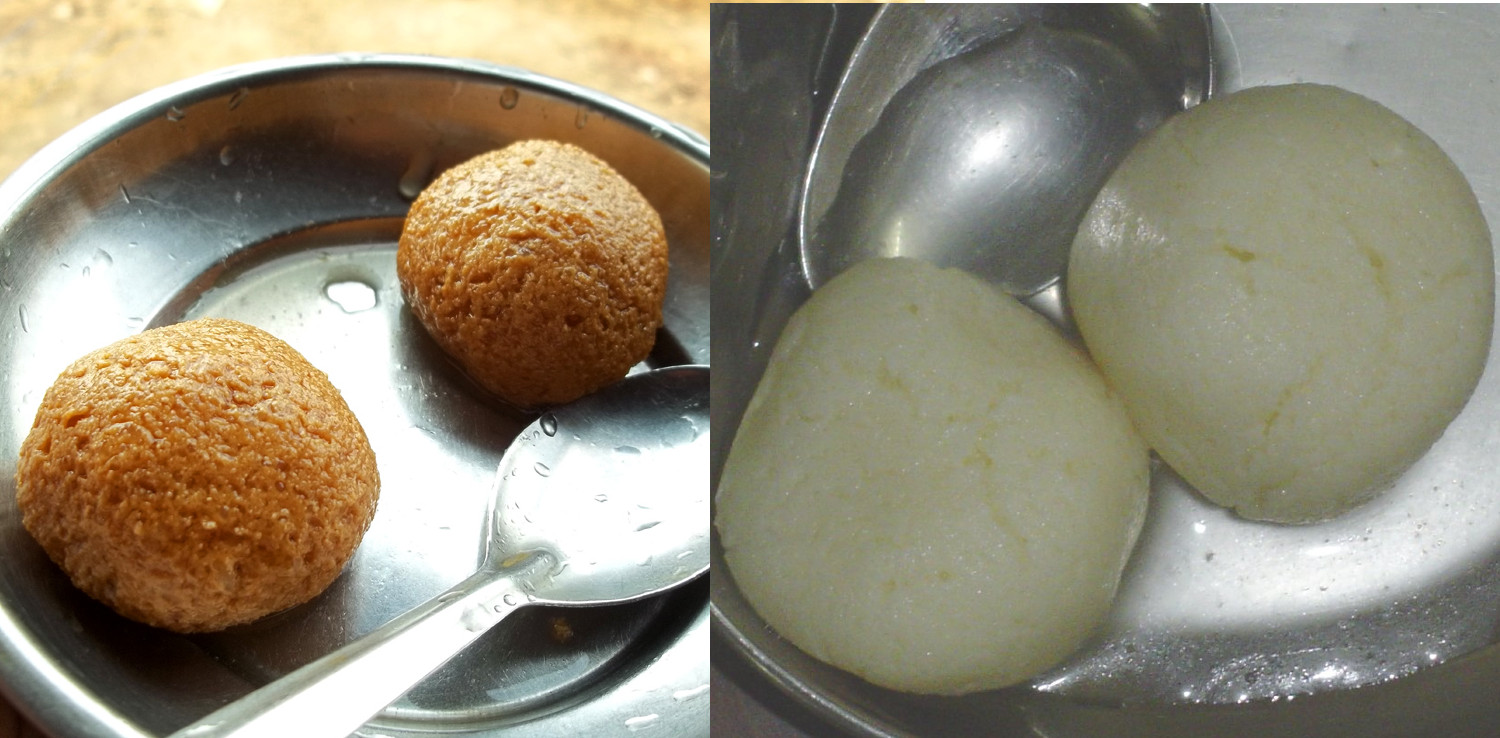
Rasgulla a famous syrupy dessert from Eastern India
- Northeast Indian cuisines:
  - Assamese cuisine
  - Arunachalese cuisine
  - Meghalayan cuisine
  - Manipuri cuisine
  - Naga cuisine
  - Mizo cuisine
  - Sikkimese cuisine
  - Tripuri cuisine
  - Gorkha cuisine
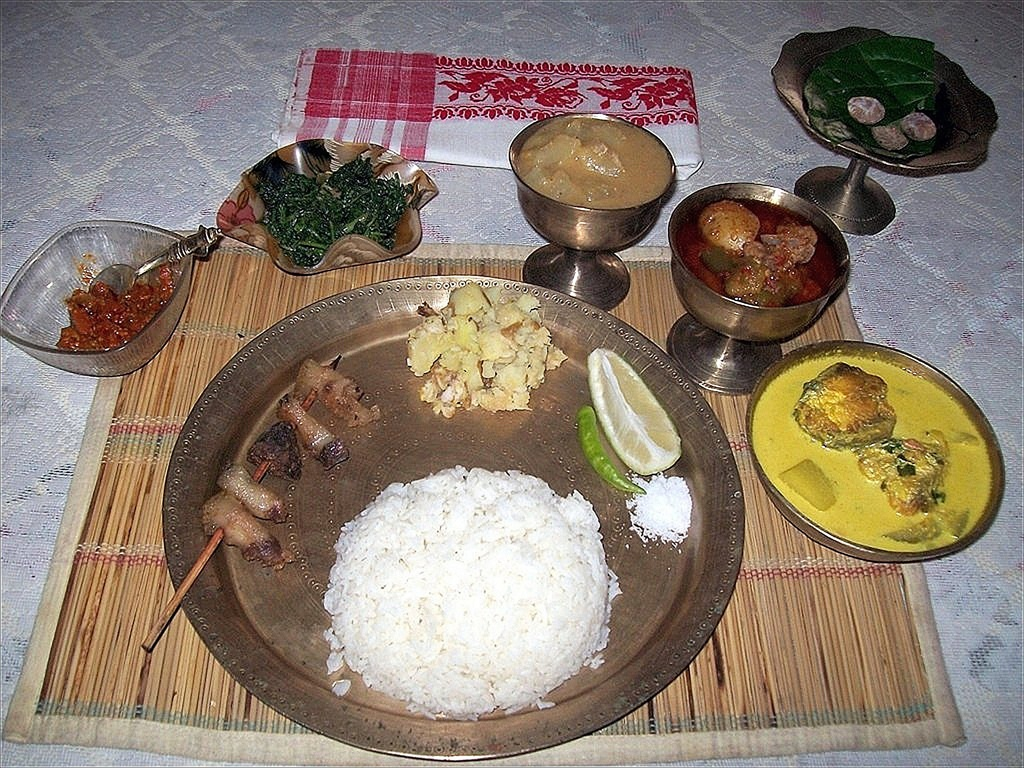
Assamese Thali

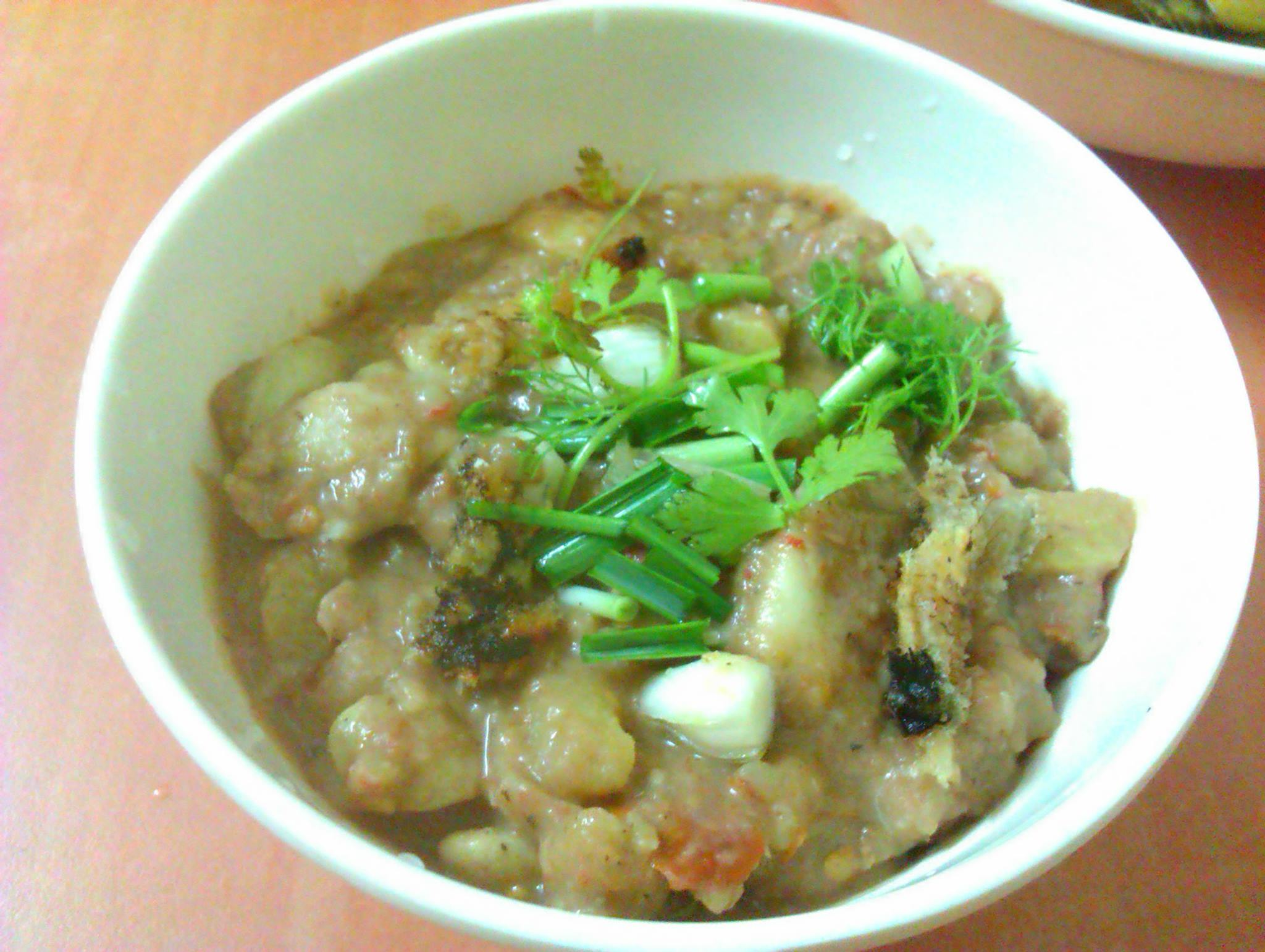
Non-Vegetarian Eromba from Manipur

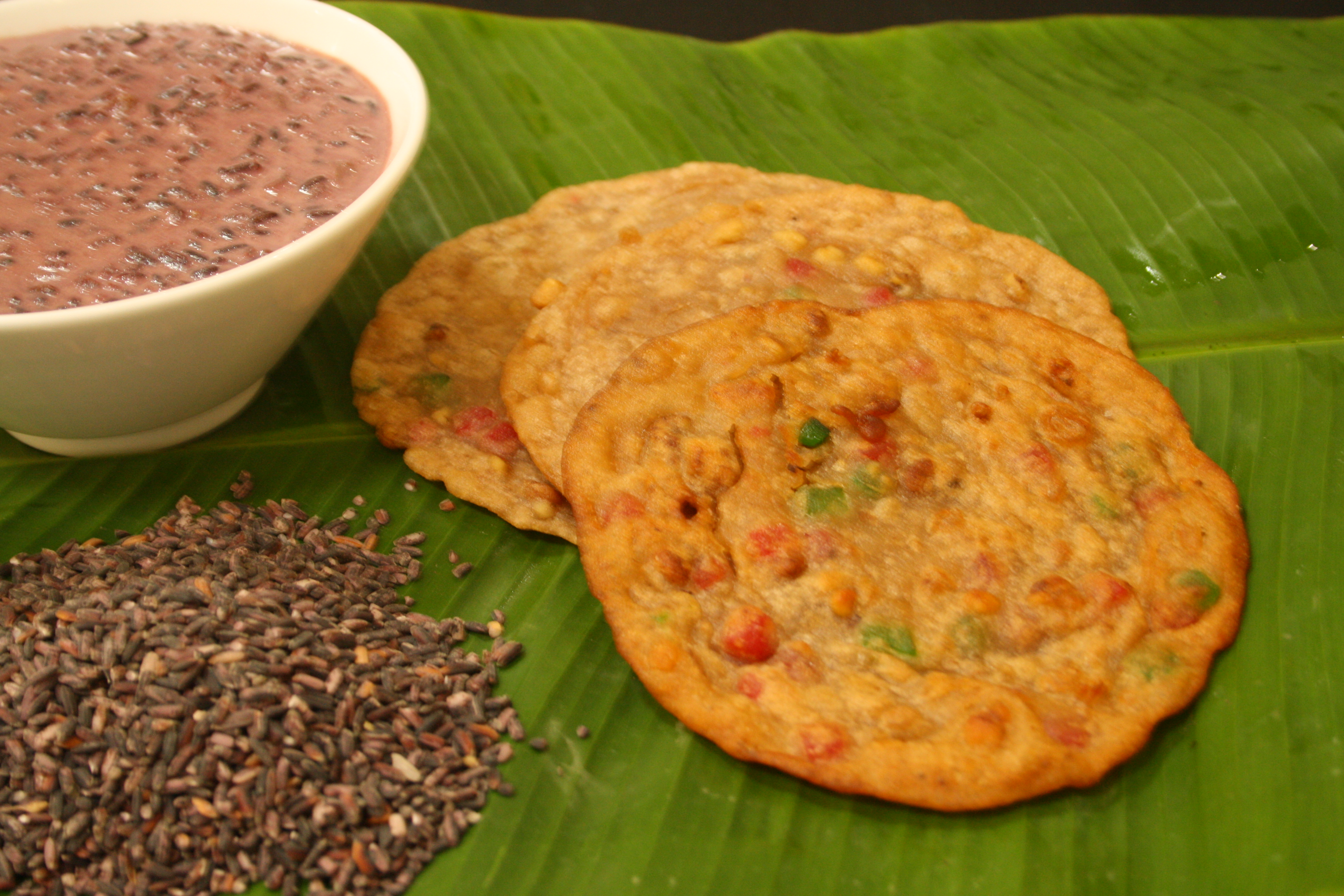
Tan Ngang a bread from Manipur

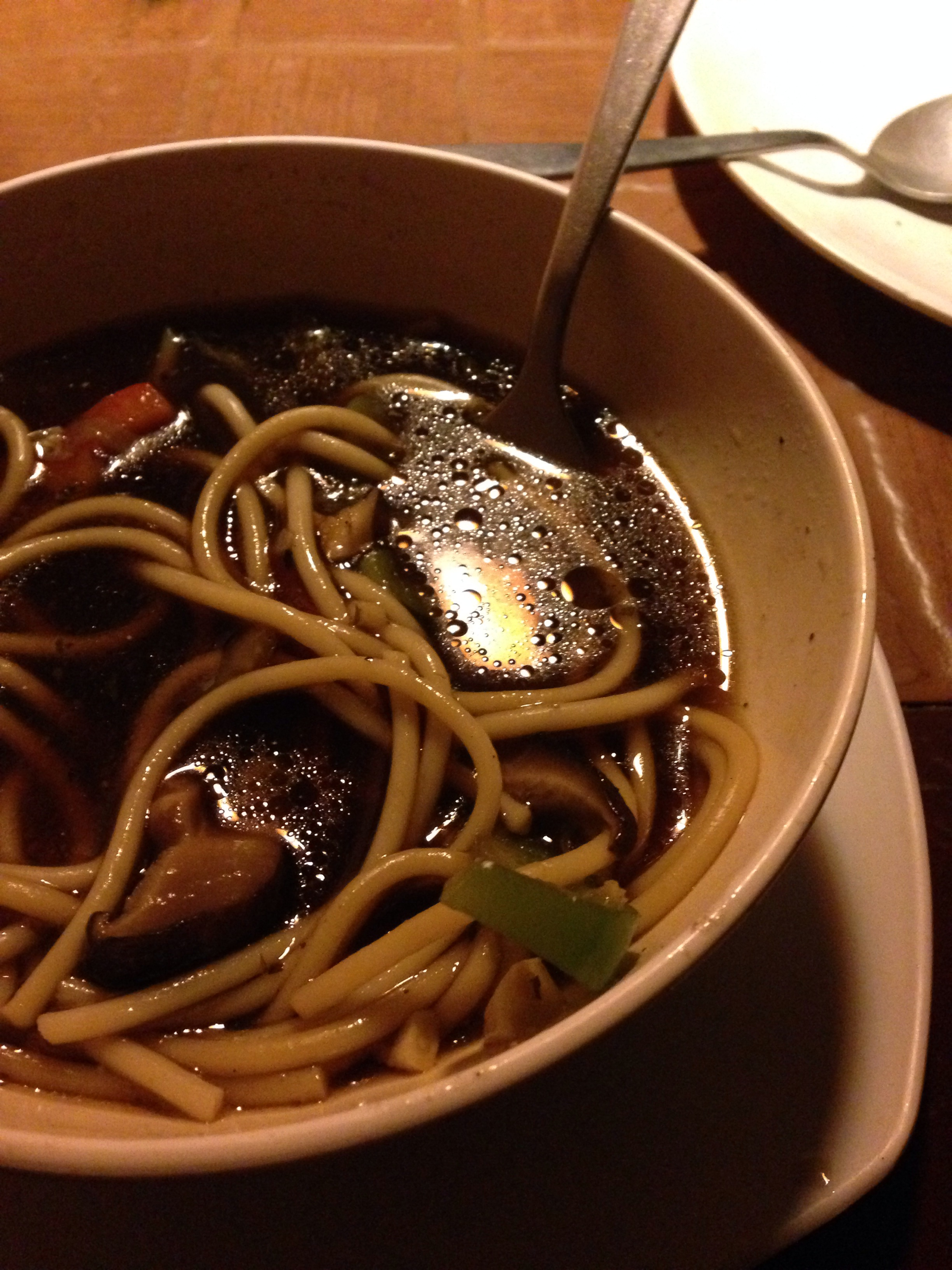
Thukpa from Sikkim
- North Indian cuisines:
  - Awadhi cuisine
  - Cuisine of Uttar Pradesh
  - Himachali cuisine
  - Kashmiri cuisine
  - Kumaoni cuisine
  - Ladakhi cuisine
  - Mughlai cuisine
  - Punjabi cuisine
  - Rajasthani cuisine
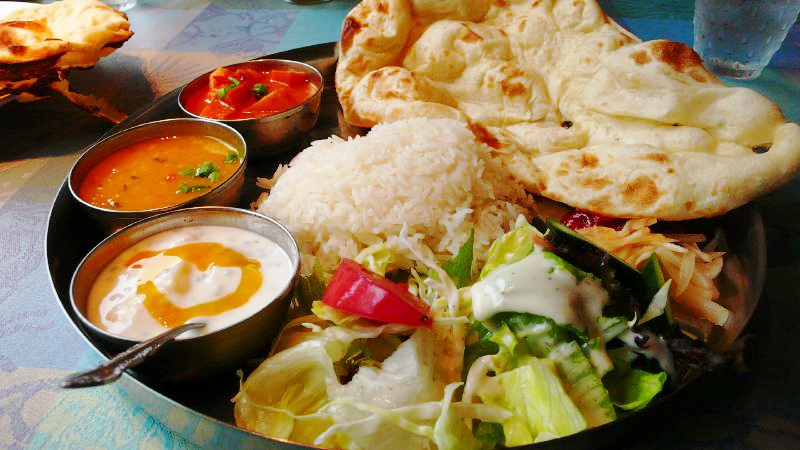
Traditional North Indian Vegetarian Thali, India

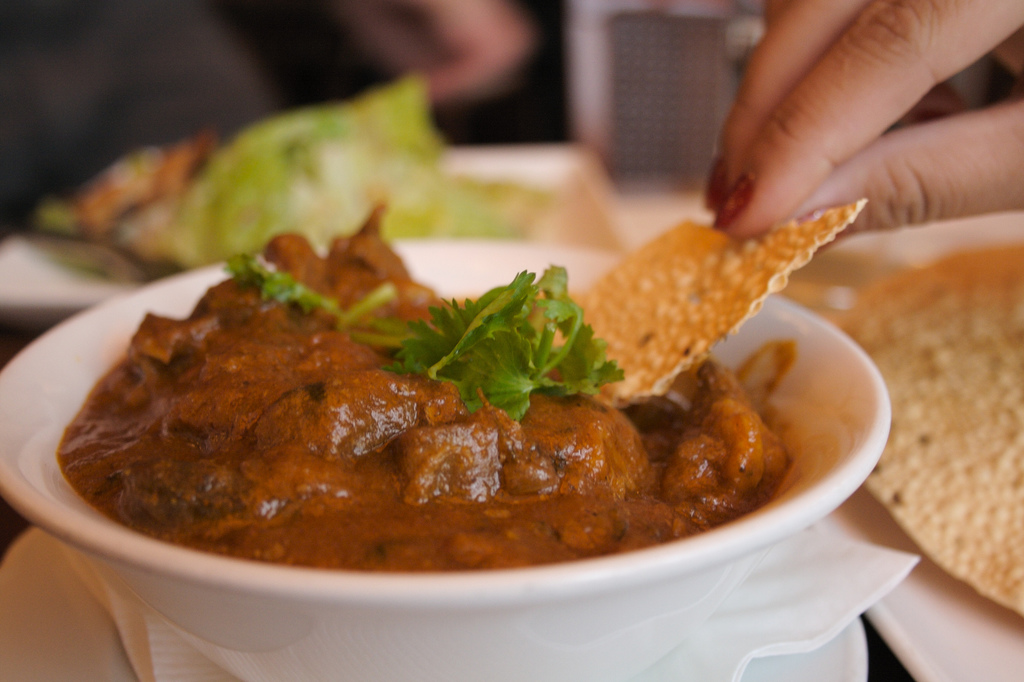
Rogan josh is a popular Kashmiri dish from India

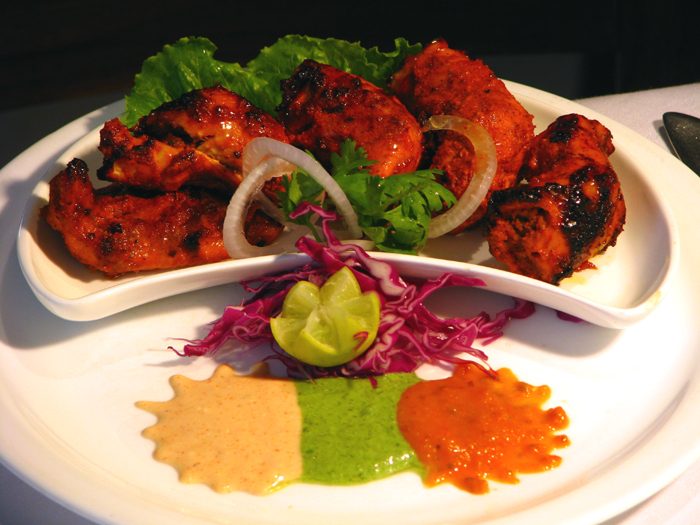
Chicken tikka in India, is a popular dish in Punjabi cuisine

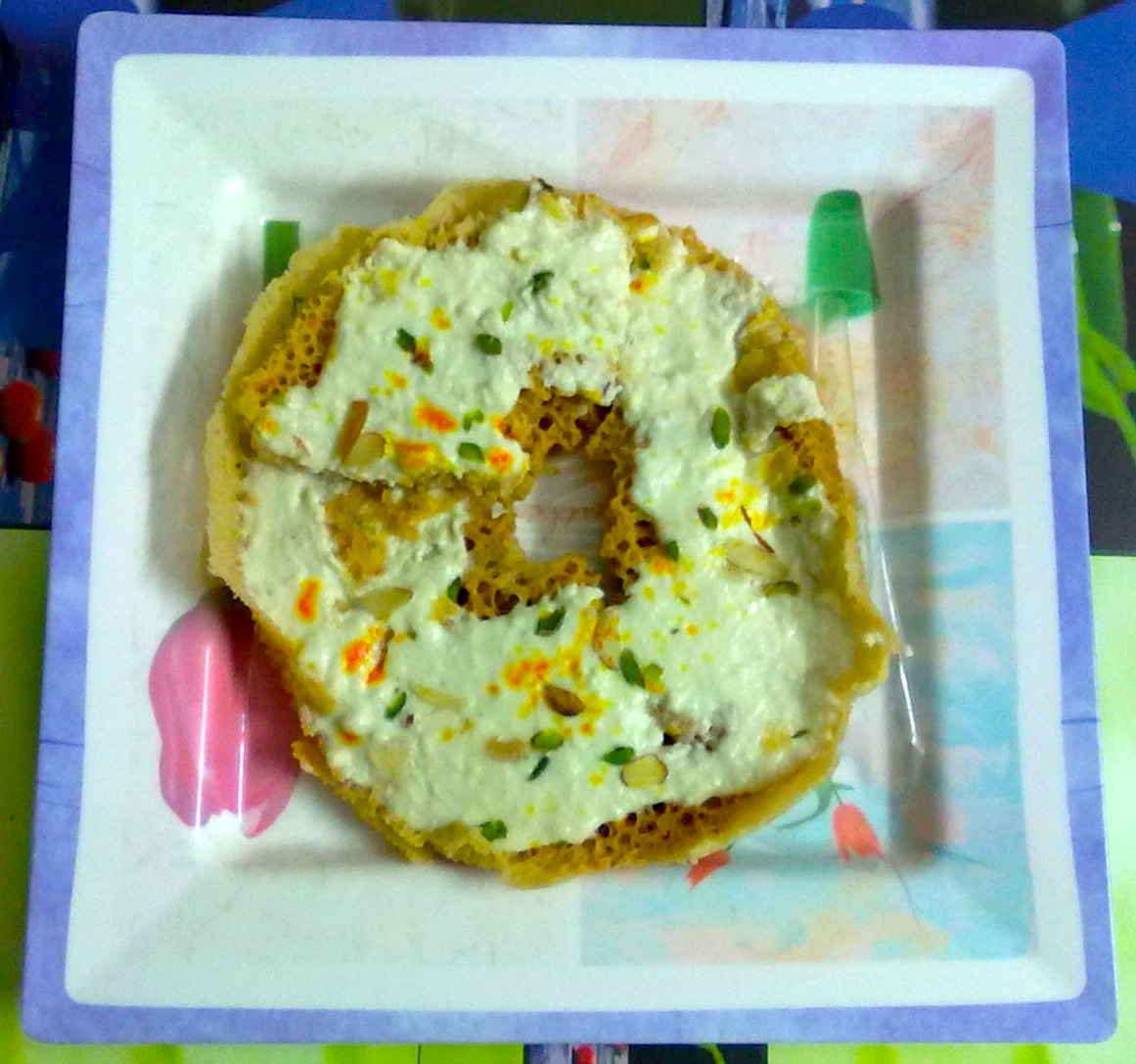
Ghevar a popular sweet dessert from Rajasthan
- South Indian cuisines:
  - Andhra cuisine
  - Chettinad cuisine
  - Dhivehi cuisine (Minicoy)
  - Hyderabadi cuisine
  - Kerala cuisine
  - Karnataka cuisine
  - Tamil cuisine
  - Thalassery cuisine
  - Udupi cuisine
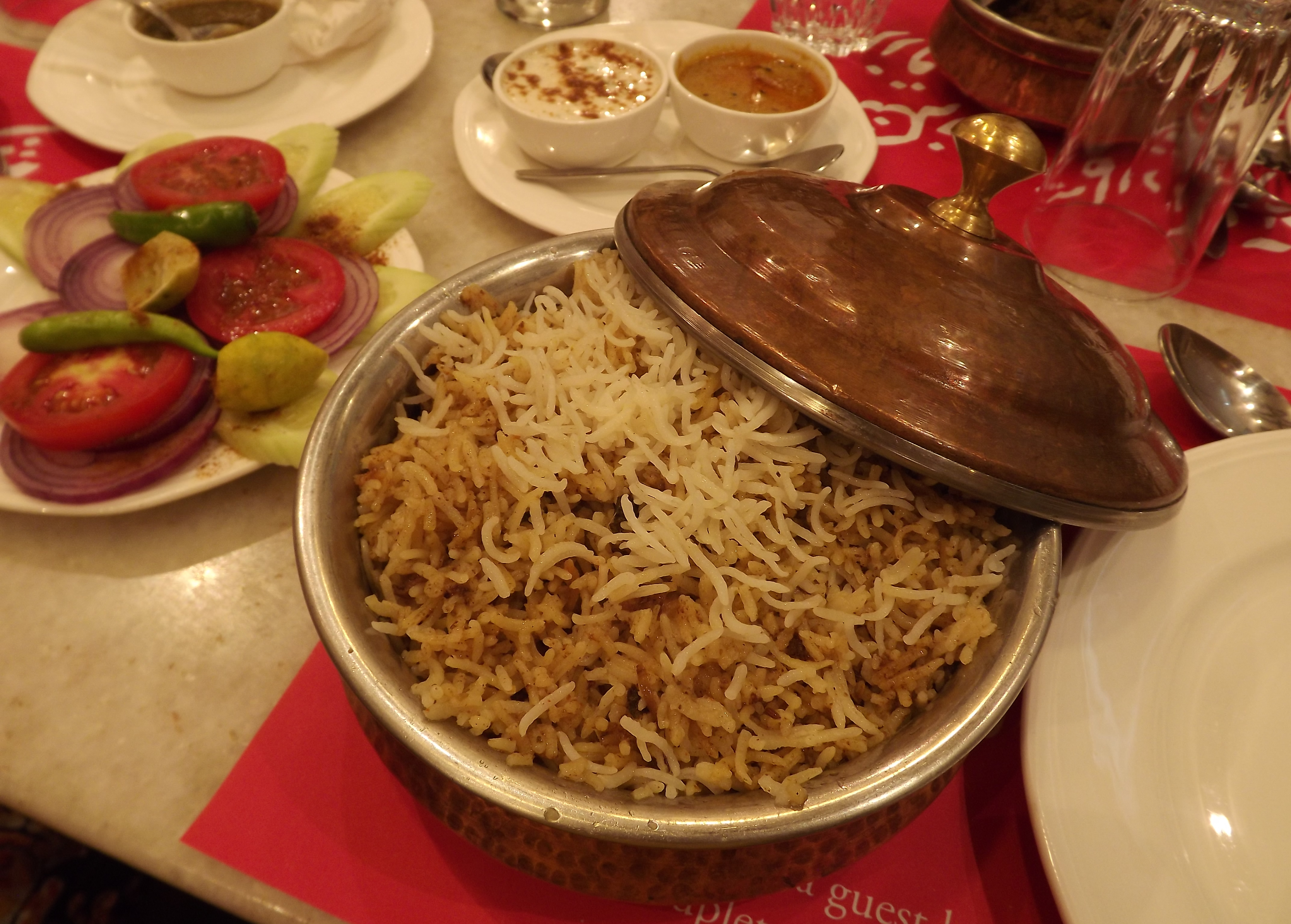
Hyderabadi Dum Biryani, India

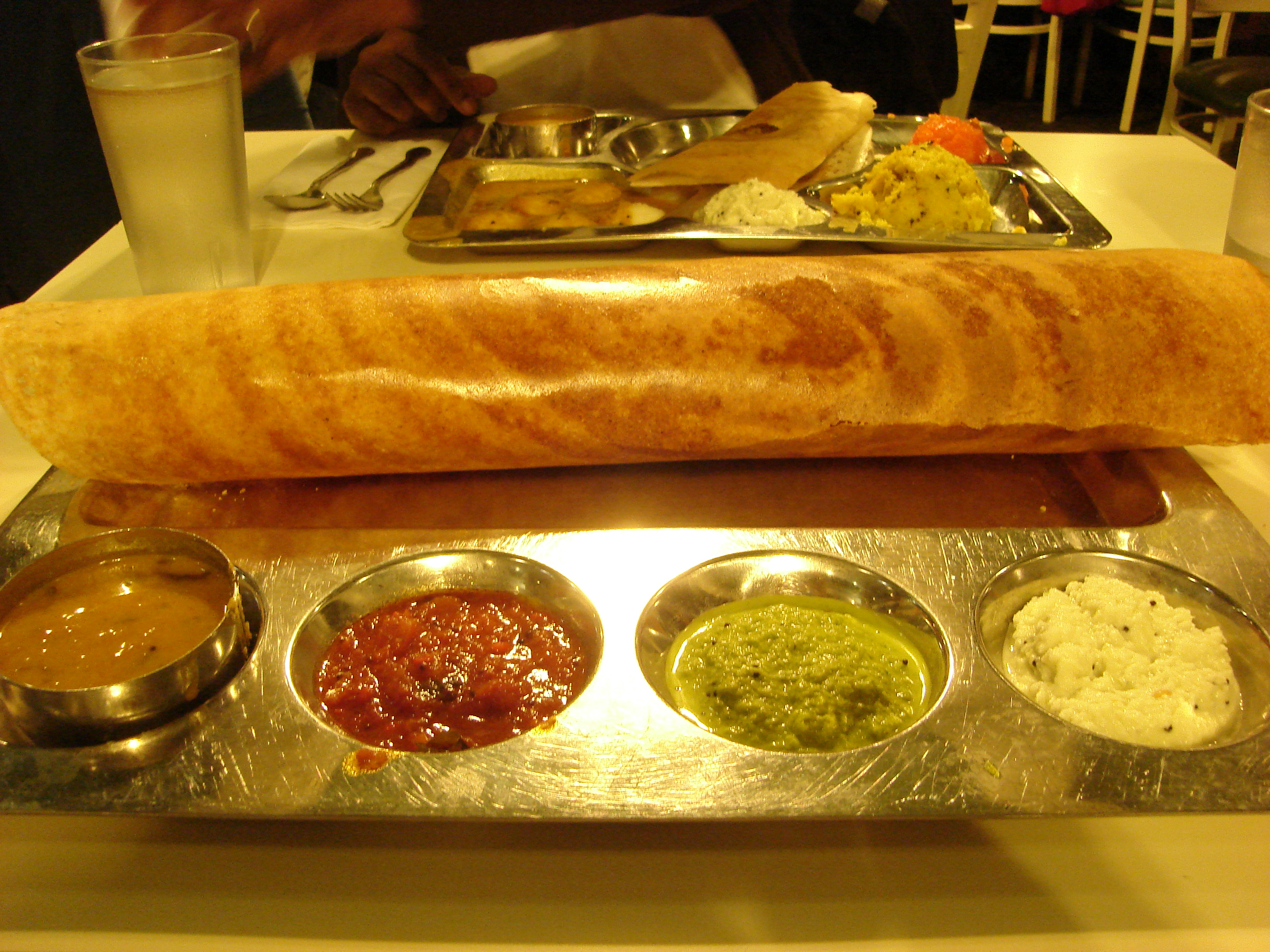
Dosa served with sambar and chutney

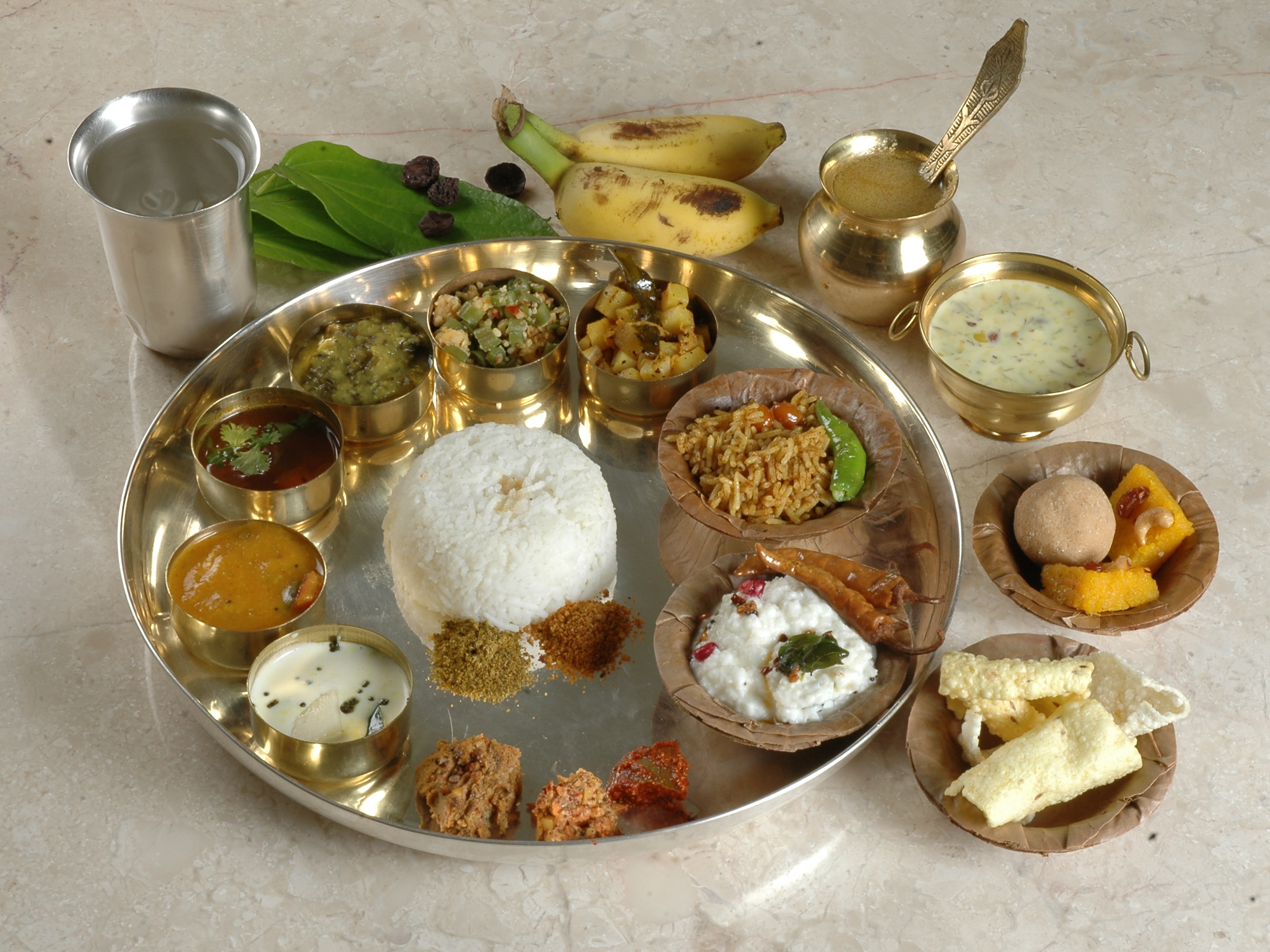
South Indian vegetarian Thali, India

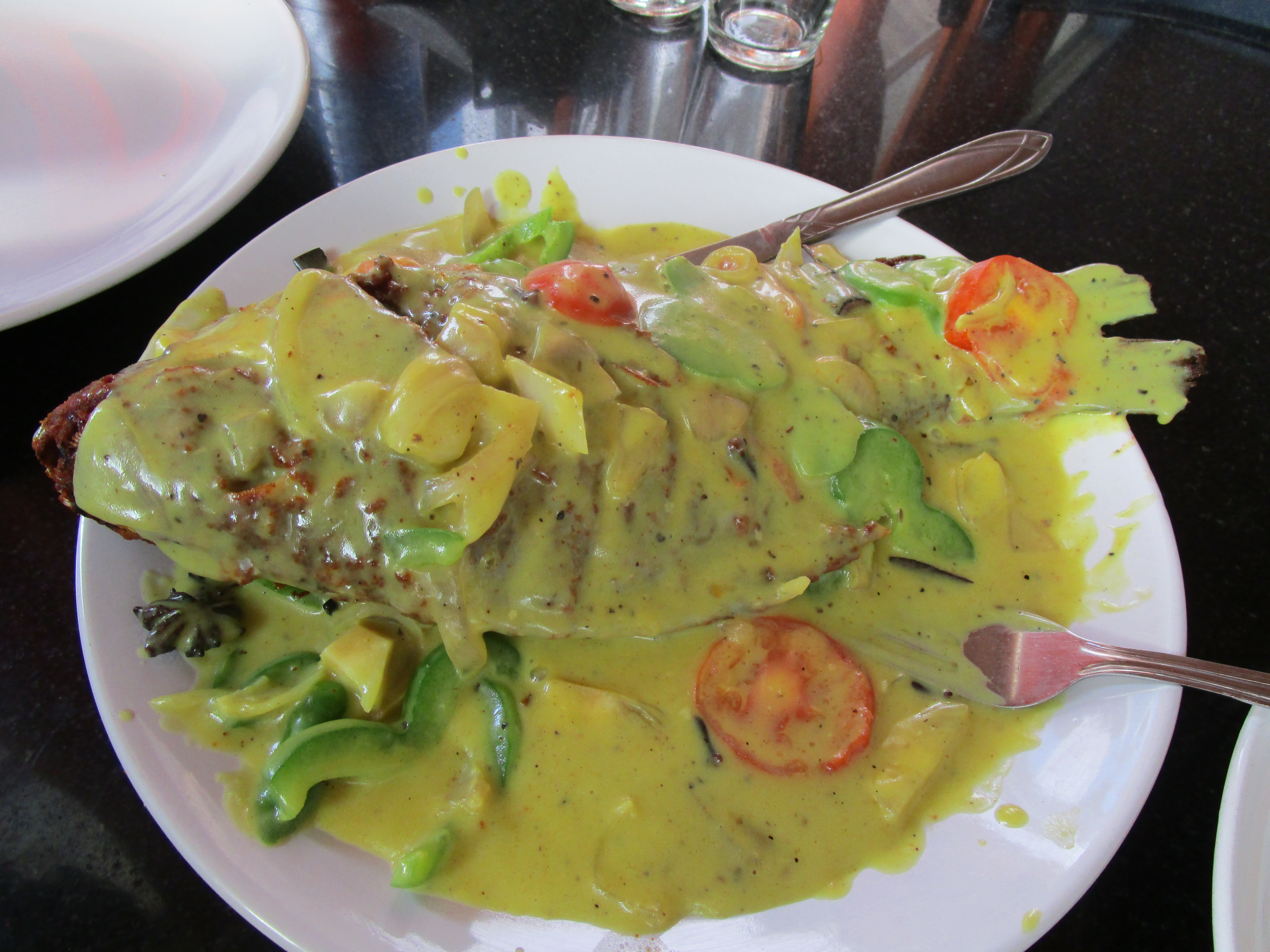
Fish moolie Kerala Style
- West Indian cuisines:
  - Goan cuisine
  - Gujarati cuisine
  - Maharashtrian cuisine
  - Malvani cuisine
  - Parsi cuisine
  - Sindhi cuisine
  - Thathai Bhatia Cuisine
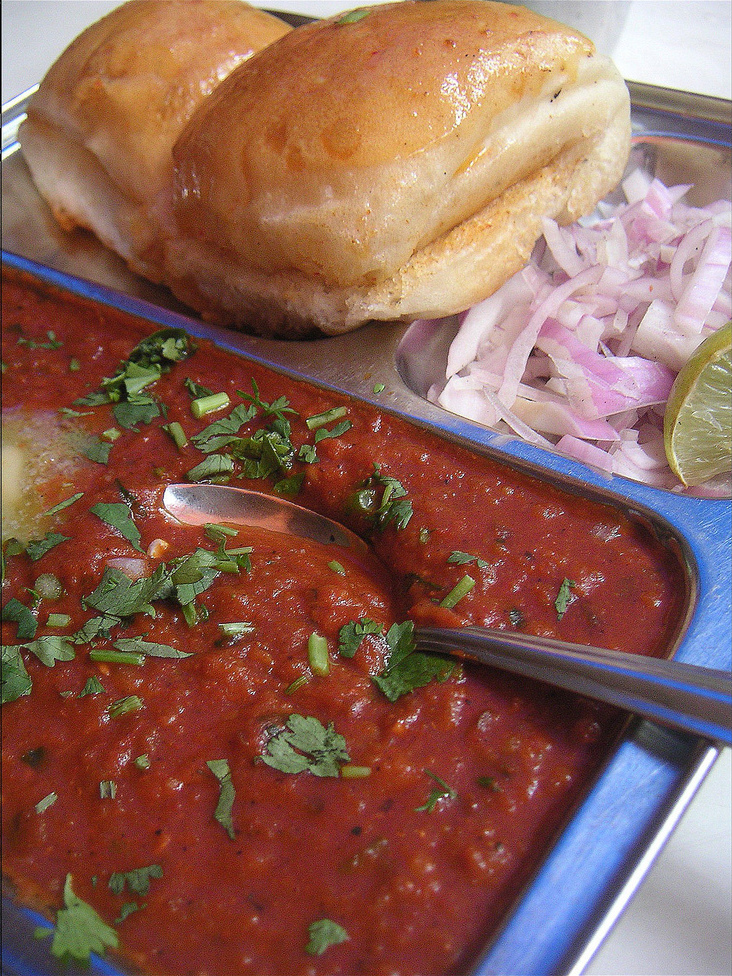
Pav Bhaji a popular fast food from Mumbai, Maharashtra

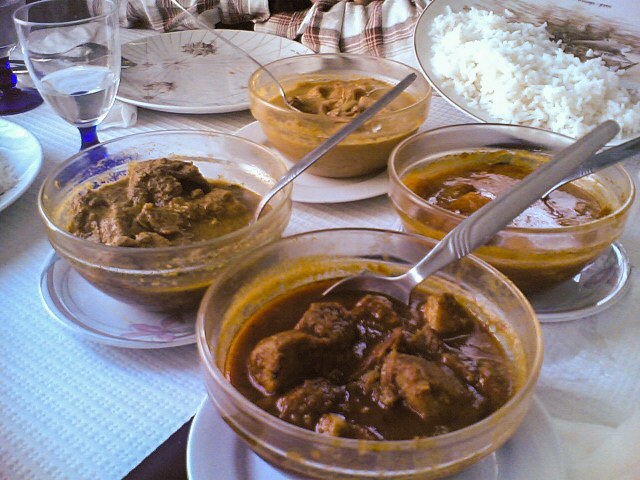
Pork Vindaloo being served at a restaurante in Goa

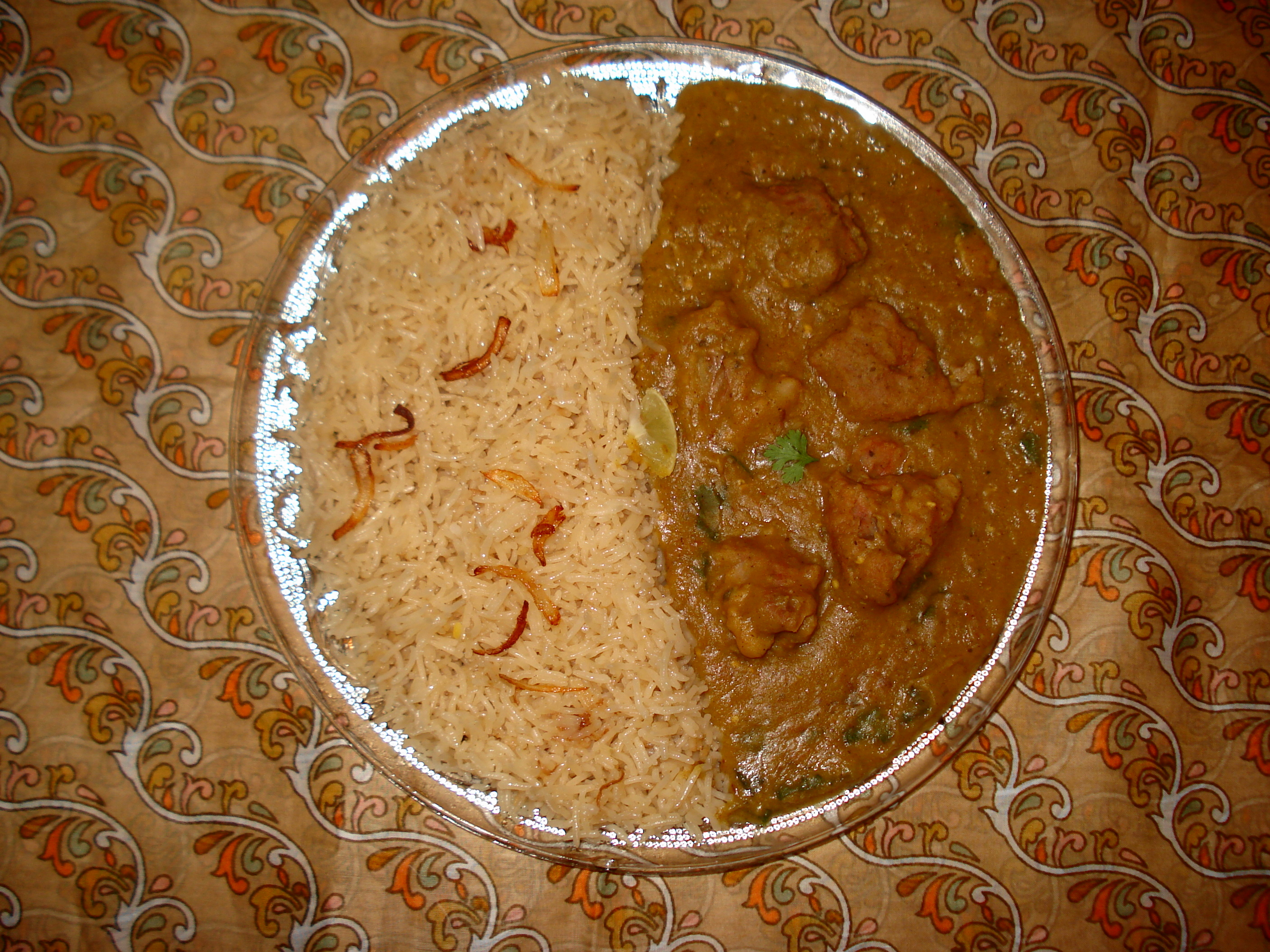
Dhansak a famous Parsi dish from Gujarat
- Other Indian cuisines include:
  - Indian Chinese cuisine
  - Jain vegetarianism
  - Indian fast food
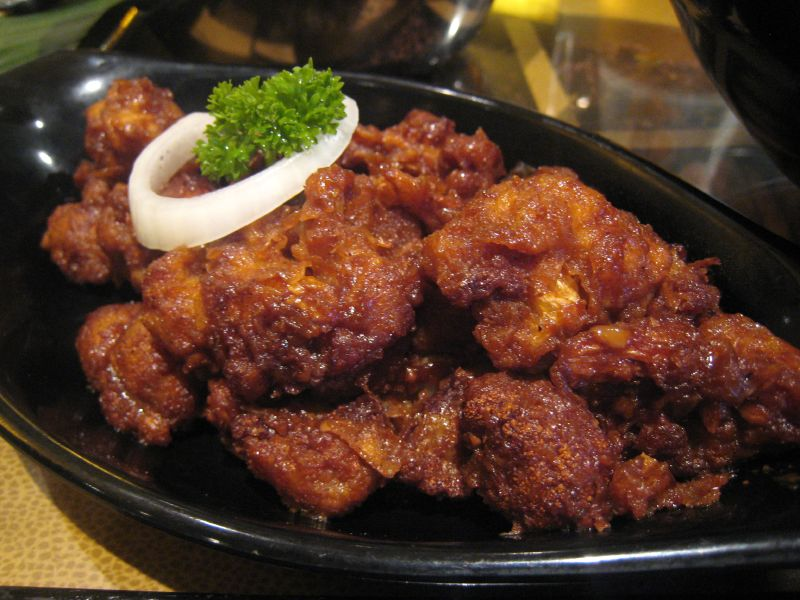
A popular Indian Chinese dish

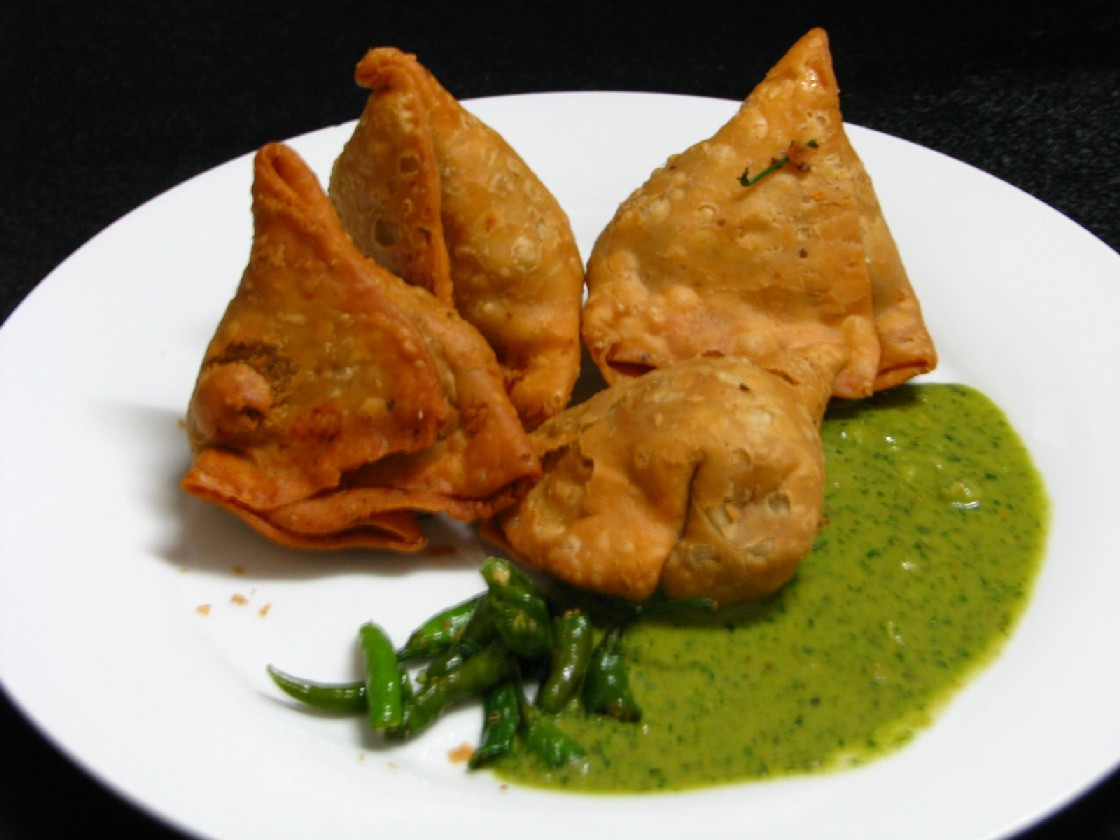
Samosa with Pudina Chutney

=== Maldives ===
Maldivian cuisine, also called Dhivehi cuisine, is the cuisine of the Nation of Maldives and of Minicoy, India. The traditional cuisine of Maldivians is based on three main items and their derivatives: coconuts, fish and starches.

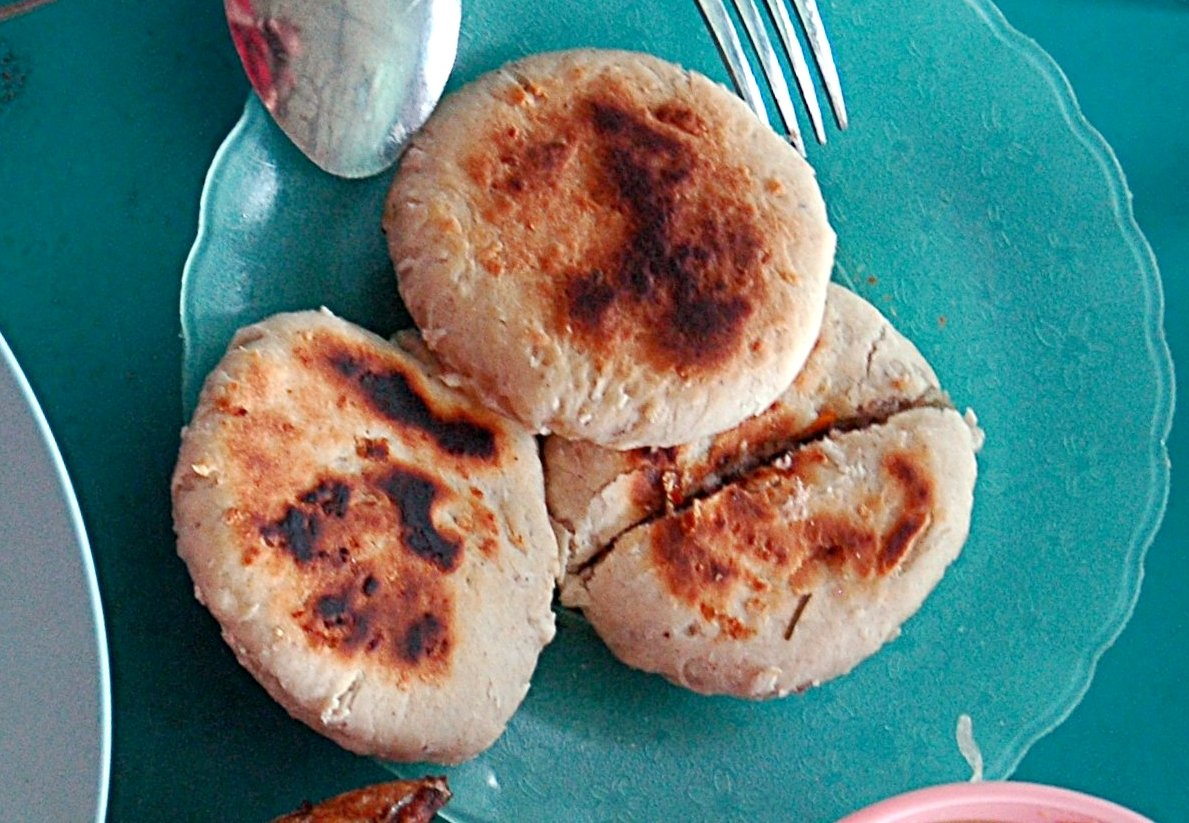
Masroshi Maldivian savory snacks

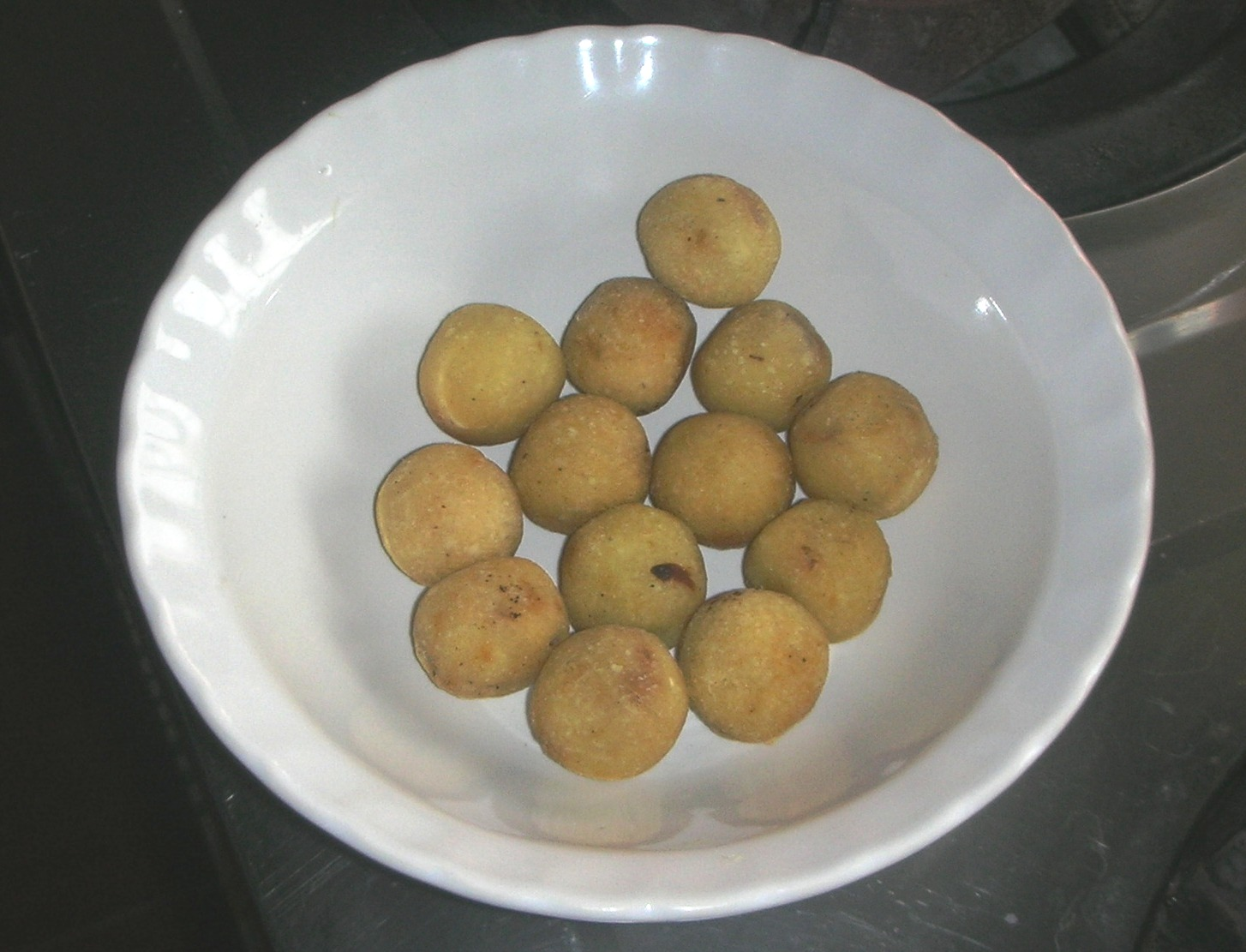
Gulha is a popular snack in Maldives

=== Nepal ===
Nepalese cuisine comprises a variety of cuisines based upon ethnicity, soil and climate relating to Nepal's cultural diversity and geography.Dal-bhat-tarkari (Nepali: दाल भात तरकारी) is eaten throughout Nepal. Nepali cuisine has significant influences from Neighboring Indian and Tibetan cuisines.

Nepalese cuisine includes:

- Newa cuisine
- Tibetan cuisine
- Maithil cuisine
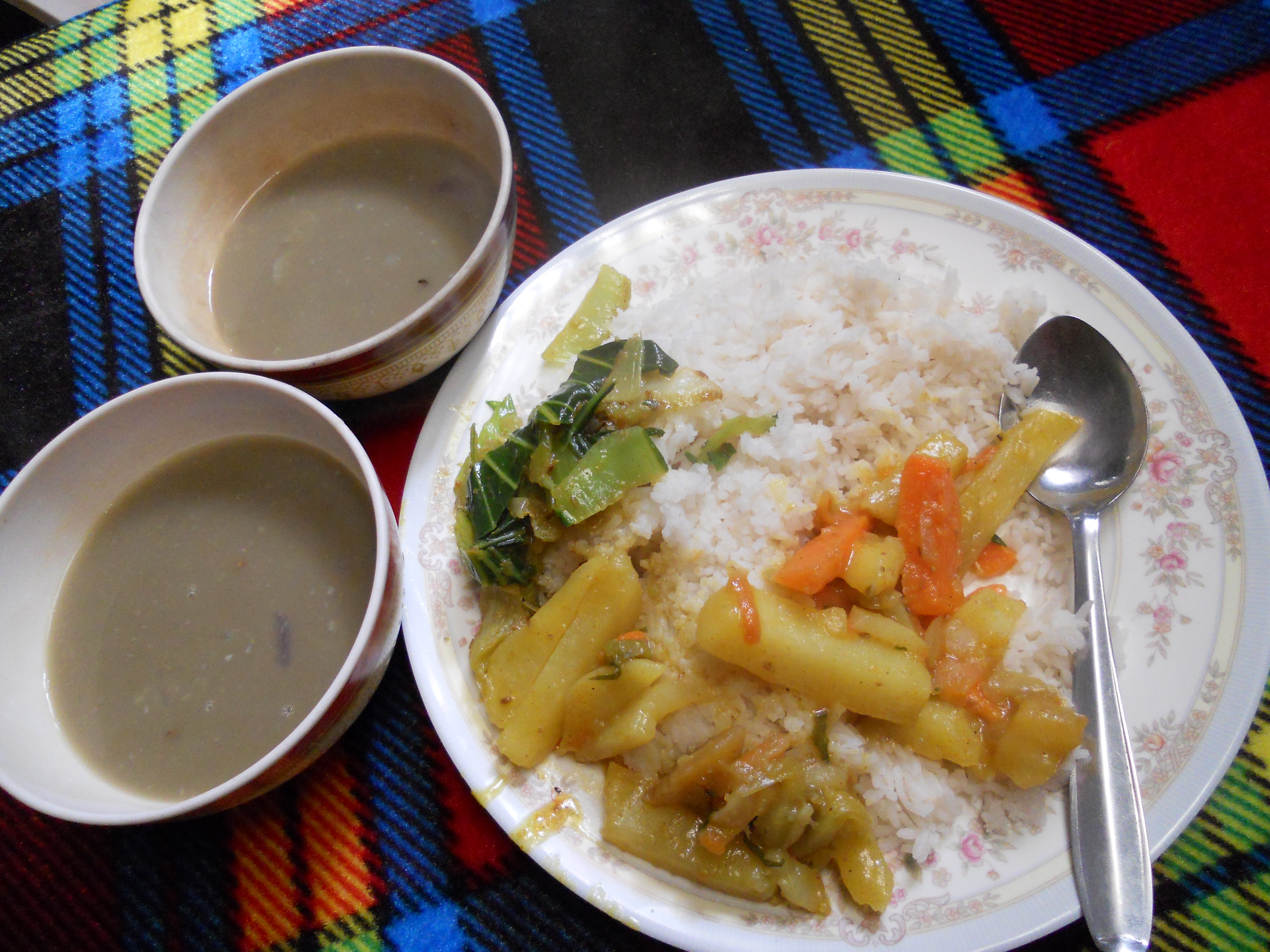
Dal-bhat-tarkari is a traditional dish in Nepalese cuisine

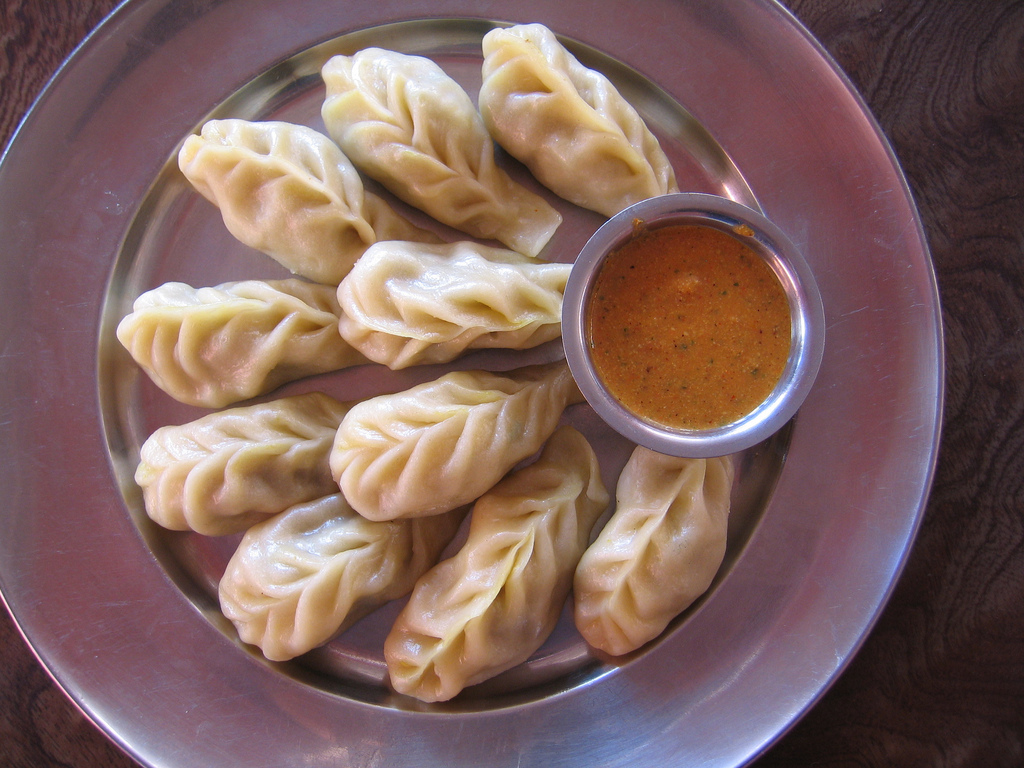
Plateful of Momo in Nepal

=== Pakistan ===
Pakistani cuisine (Urdu: پاکستانی پکوان) is part of the greater South Asian with significant influence from West Asian cuisines and Central Asian cuisines due to its geographic location and influence. As a result of Mughal legacy, Pakistan also mutually inherited many recipes and dishes from that era alongside India.

Regional cuisines include:

- Balochi cuisine
- Chitrali cuisine
- Kalash cuisine
- Lahori cuisine
- Cuisine of Karachi
- Pashtun cuisine
- Punjabi cuisine
- Saraiki cuisine
- Sindhi cuisine
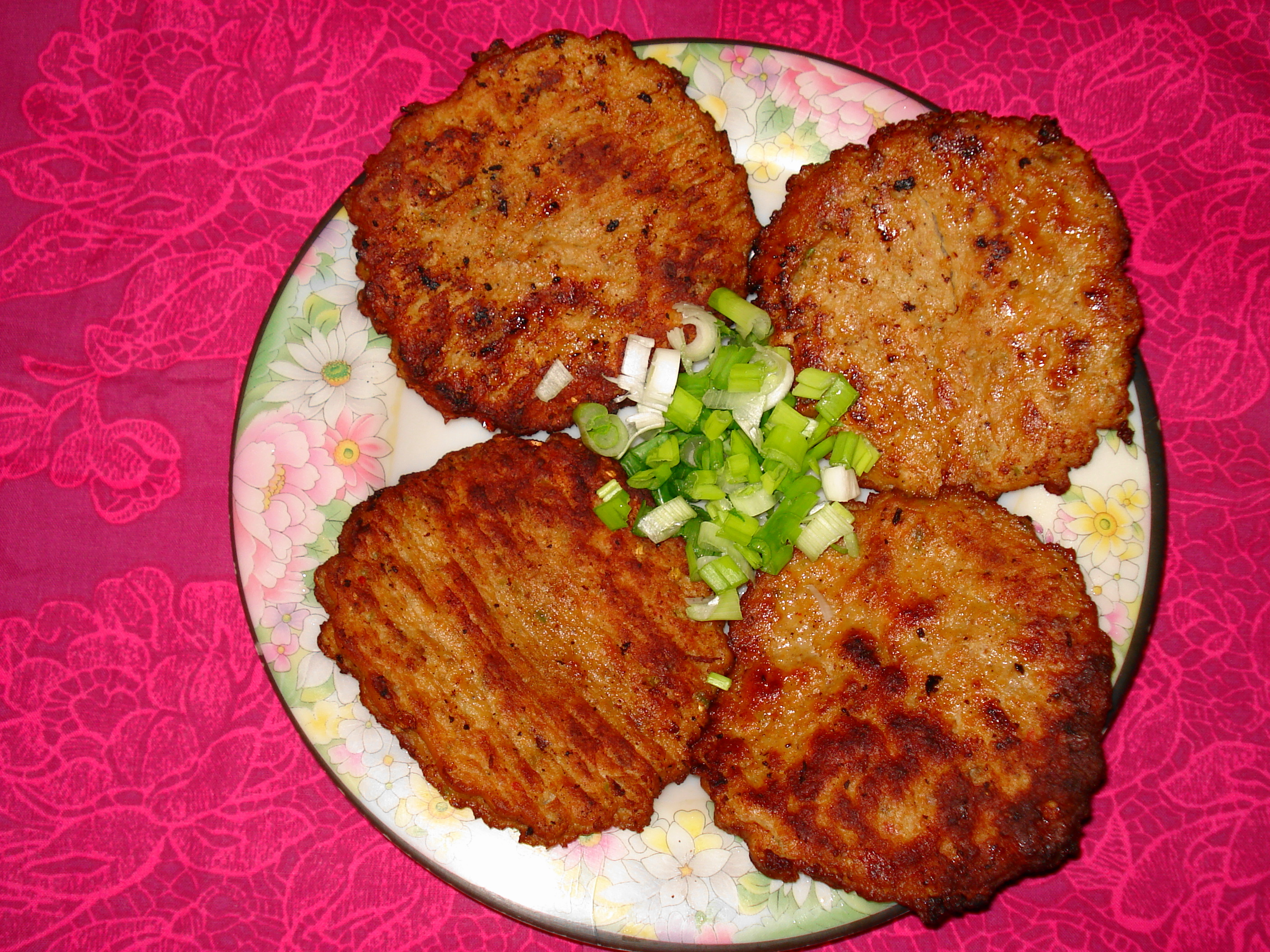
Chapli kebab, a popular kebab from Pashtunistan

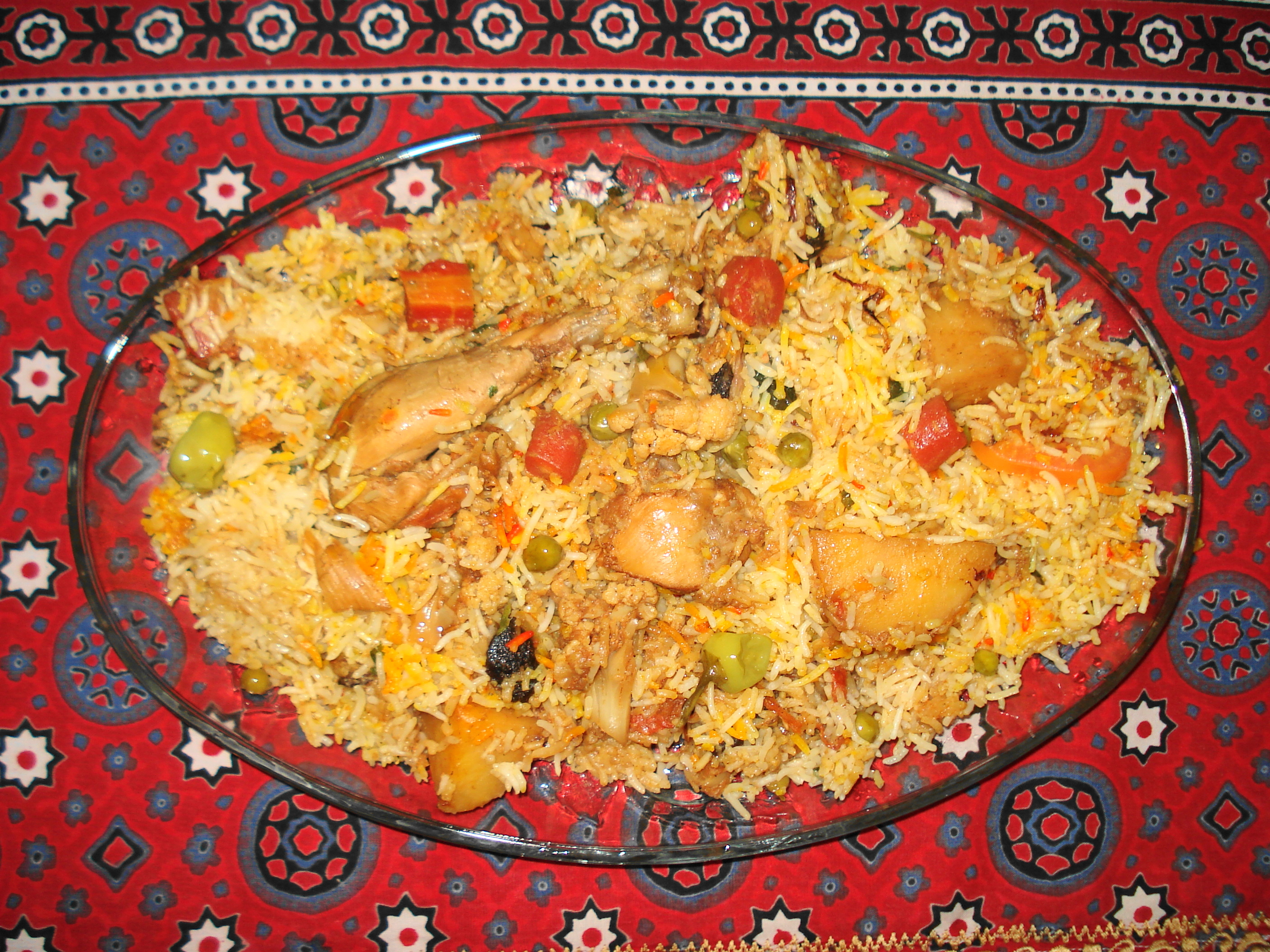
Sindhi biryani

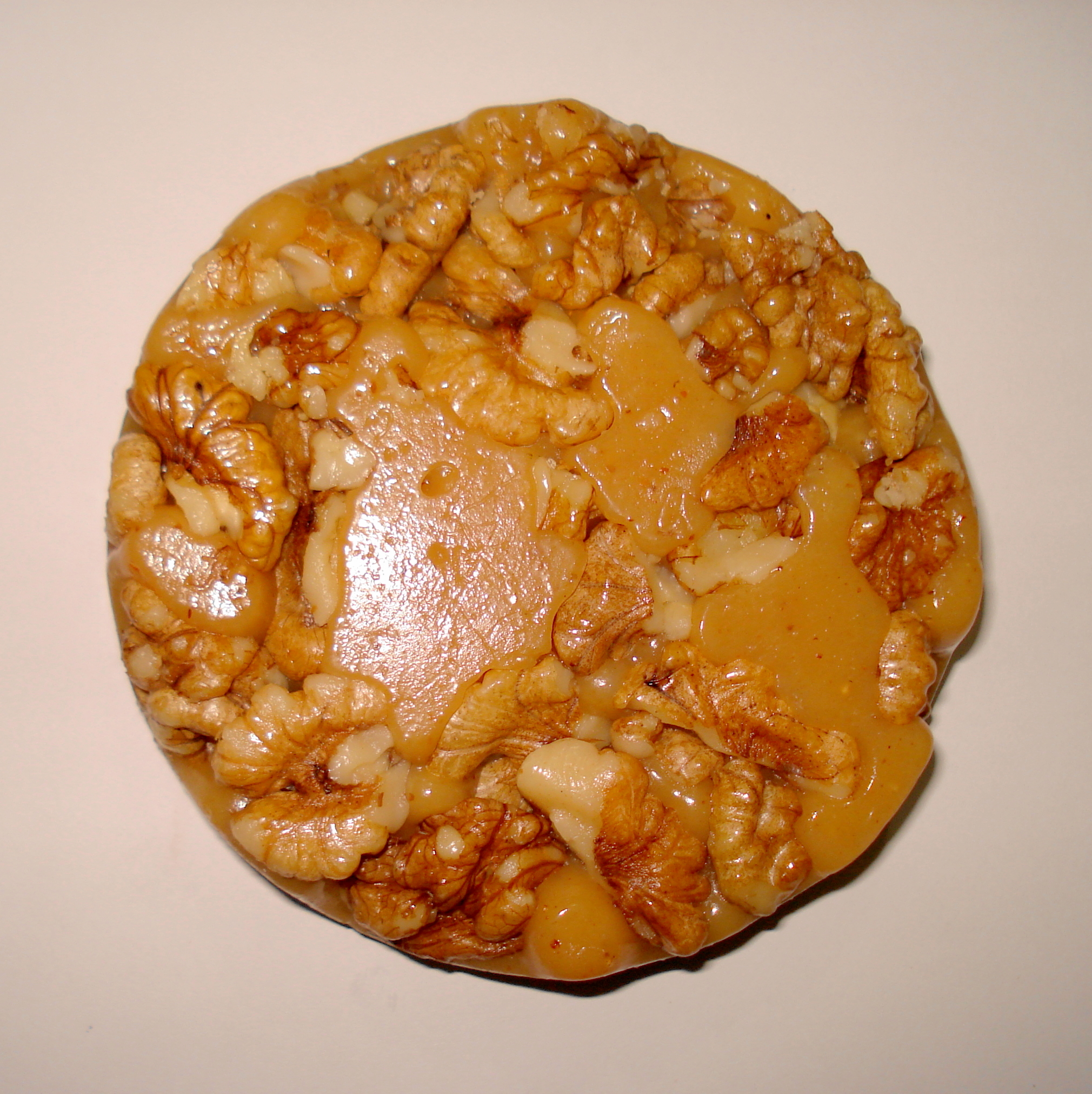
Sohan halwa from Multan, a popular Saraiki dessert

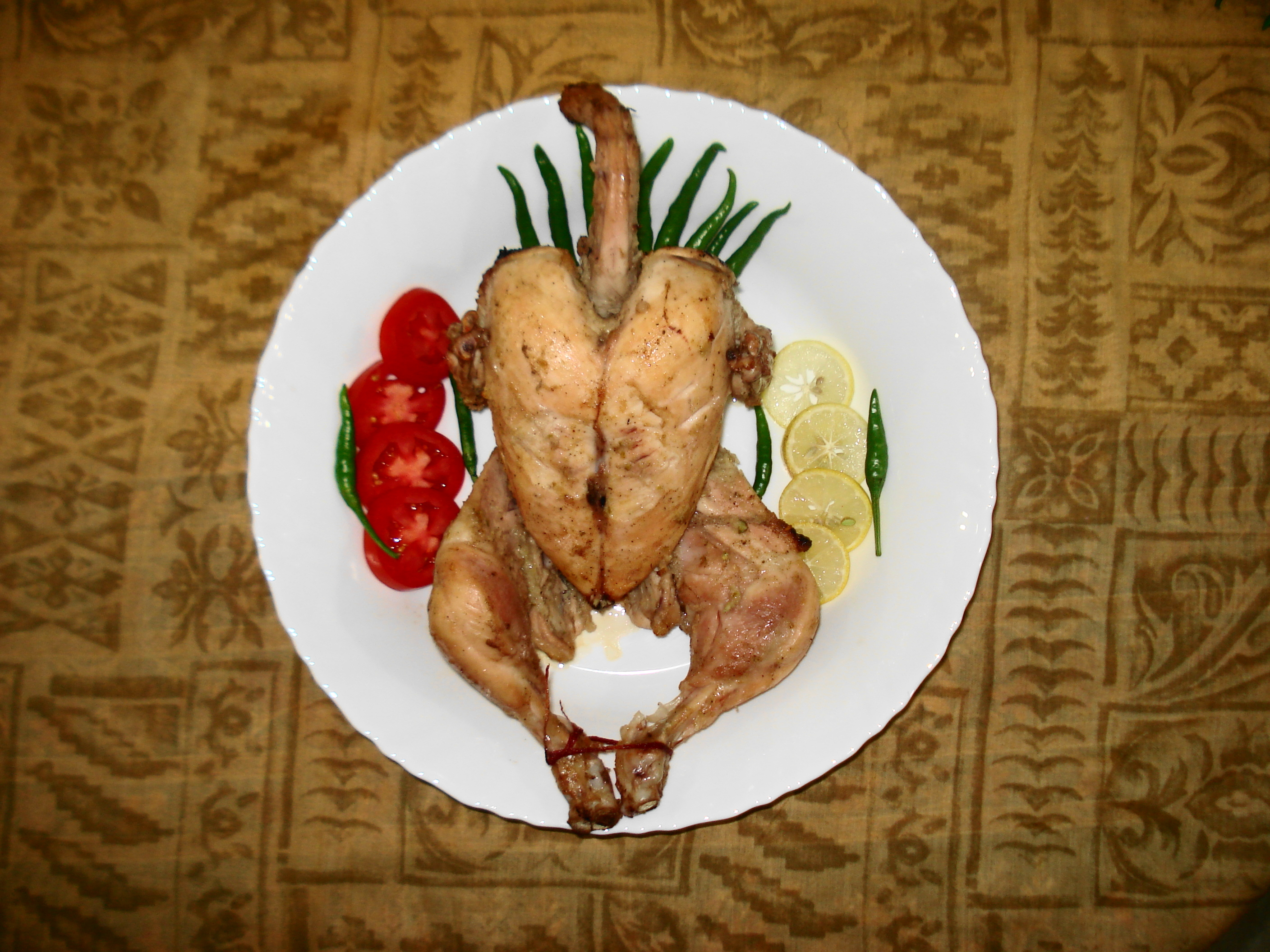
Sajji, a popular meat dish of Balochistan

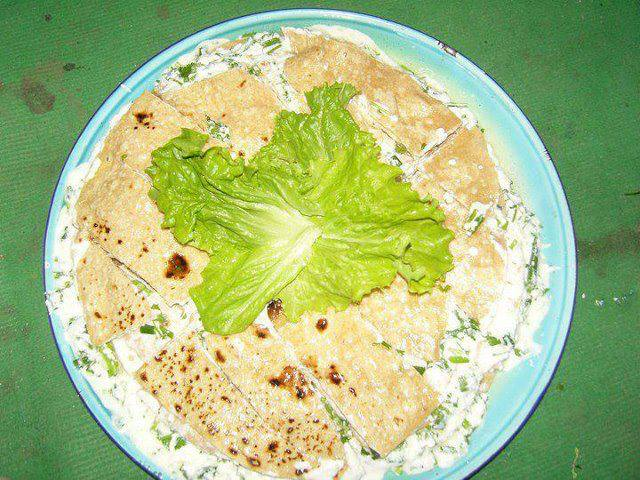
Ghalmandi with cottage cheese and herbs from Chitral

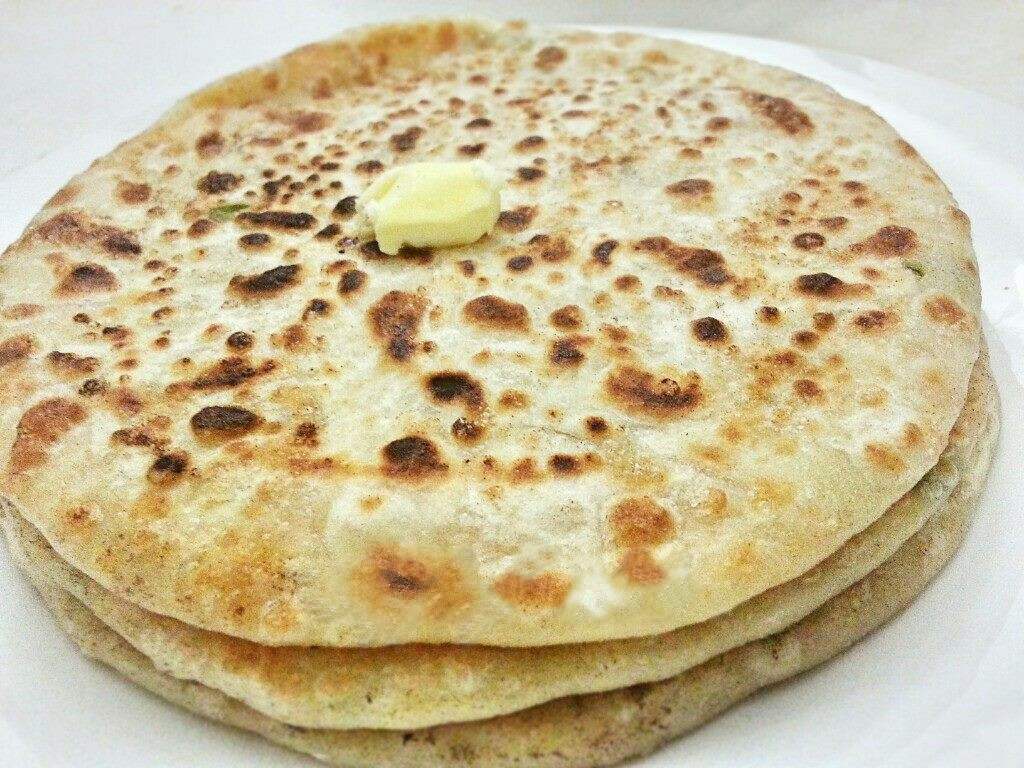
Aloo paratha from Faisalabad, Punjab

Other Pakistani cuisine include:

- Pakistani Chinese cuisine
- Mughlai cuisine (Karachi)
- Pakistani fast food

=== Sri Lanka ===
Sri Lankan cuisine has been shaped by many historical, cultural, and other factors. Foreign traders who brought new food items; influences from Malay cuisine and South Indian cuisine are evident.

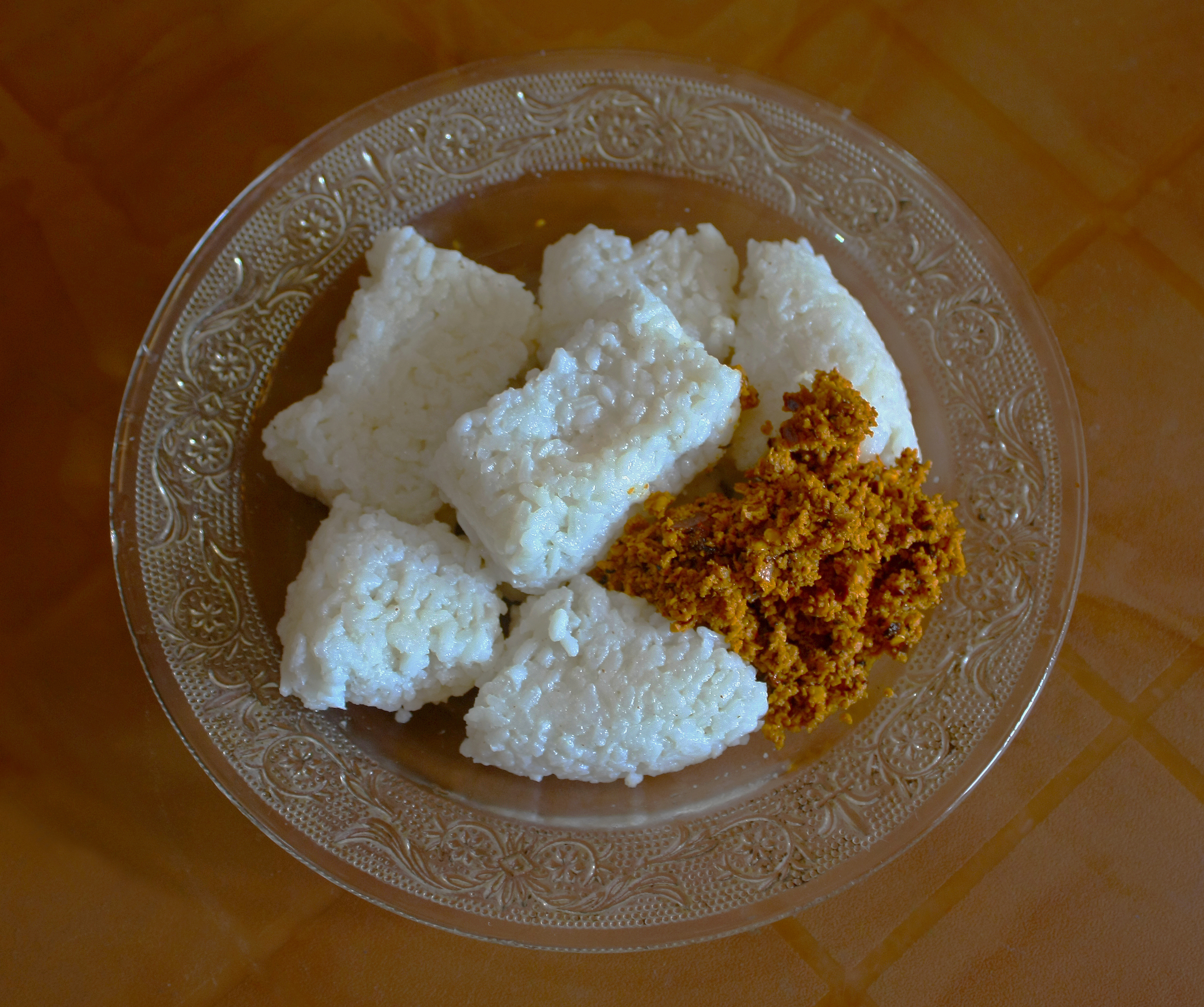
Kiribath is a traditional rice pudding from Sri Lanka

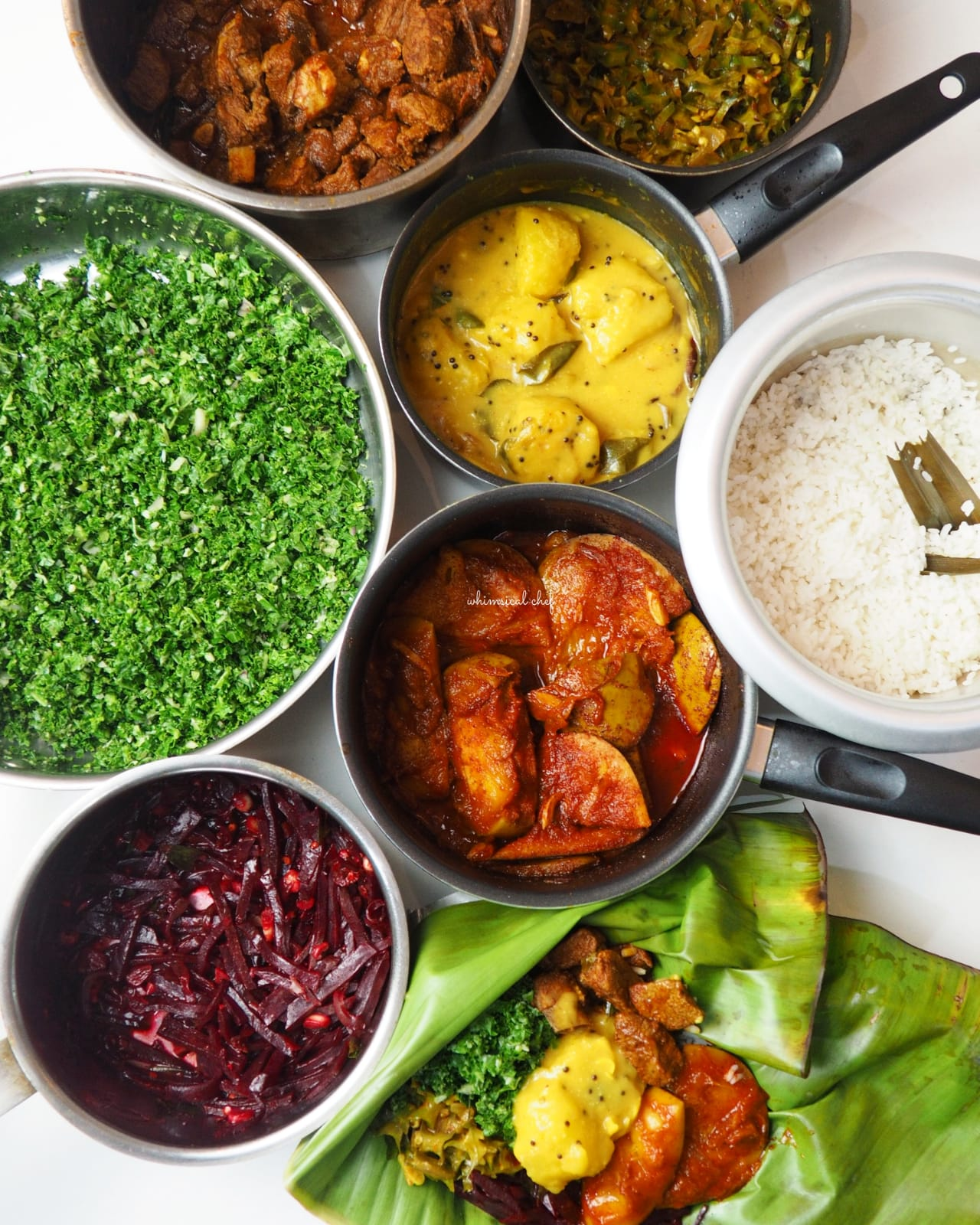
A Sri Lankan rice and curry meal consisting of cassava curry, curried lamb, stir-fried beetroot, stir-fried winged beans, raw mango curry and kale mallum

== See also ==
- List of Asian cuisines
