= Kalash cuisine =

Kalash cuisine consists of indigenous dishes as well as many local Pakistani cuisine influences. Foodstuffs such as apricots, grapes, mulberries, walnuts and wheat are grown in the Kalash valleys.

== Kalasha traditional dishes, foods and beverages ==
=== Breads ===
- Bilili (walnut bread), one of the most popular traditional Kalash staples, made from batter mixed with nut meats and fried on a pan;
- Jã'u, (walnut bread) thick bread stuffed with walnuts (and sometimes cheese), baked from dough beside a fire;
- Kurau (bread), a kind of bread of flour, wine (juice collected from crushed grapes), and walnut meats;
- Capoti, a type of thick bread made with dough put aside for a time to season;
- Pes' sali au, a large bread made from either wheat or corn and eaten with gaz'agaz'i (thick walnut butter). It is given to men working on the fields;
- Tewreshak, a Kalasha bread garnished with melted clarified butter and salt;
- Tasil'i, a flat, round, unleavened bread, usually consisting of a batter made from corn or wheat flour, fried on a convex griddle, a variant tasil'i parat'ha alo includes clarified butter and is much more moist;
- T'iki, bread deep fried in oil;
- Mos au (meat bread), made by putting small pieces of meat and ground up walnut meats with some sour pomegranate juice and coriander into dough and baking it on a griddle until it is firm, then putting it under the ashes until it has finished baking;
- Mand'awarwac', (eagle bread) a large round loaf of bread with a hawk or eagle design on it, made with wheat flour and eaten during the winter festival 'cawmos'. The bread is believed to be pure;
- Shurukut'ulak, round bread stuffed with crushed walnuts with scalloped edge, made by a bride for the first visit back to a parental home since marriage;
- T'at'ori, a thick bread filled with walnut meats, roasted in hot coals. It is made from dough, rather than batter which the similar tasil'i is made from.

=== Cheeses ===
- Gulak, round balls of cottage cheese;
- Amishtyonu, a cheese dish of sacõ' topped with hot butter;
- Kuind'a, a sharp, aged type of c'as'a (a type of cottage cheese);
- Kil'a', a delicious (sour?) type of cheese made with rennet;
- Katak c'as'a ('new c'as'a'), cottage cheese made from milk of a newly freshened goat or cow. From the beginning when a cow gives birth, they milk her and make katak c'as'a. For four or five days they make this. If a goat is born, only the men can eat the cheese made from the enriched milk. If a cow is born, both men and women can eat;
- Sacõ', a kind of cheese made by boiling buttermilk while c'as'a is made with milk. The dogs drink the watery by-product;
- Tsikir, another type of cheese;
- Pandir, a type of aged cheese;
- Doa, a cake of cheese, said to be ritually pure. This is a kind of c'as'a 'cottage cheese' made during ucaw 'the harvest festival' and zhoshi 'the spring festival' from the total milk received in one or two days. Because it is holy it is only eaten by men.

=== Others ===
- Rhuta jã' (coated walnuts), a delicacy of walnut meat covered in a mixture of wine and mulberry flour;
- Sonabanci, a mixture of ground walnuts and mulberries;
- Jã'gai, walnut butter (usually a thin mixture), made from cracked and mashed walnuts mixed with water, cheese and salt. There is a thicker variant called gaz'agaz'i;
- Sat'uk, (apple sauce) a sauce made from ground, dried apples.
