= Sai bhaji =

Sindhi curry dish

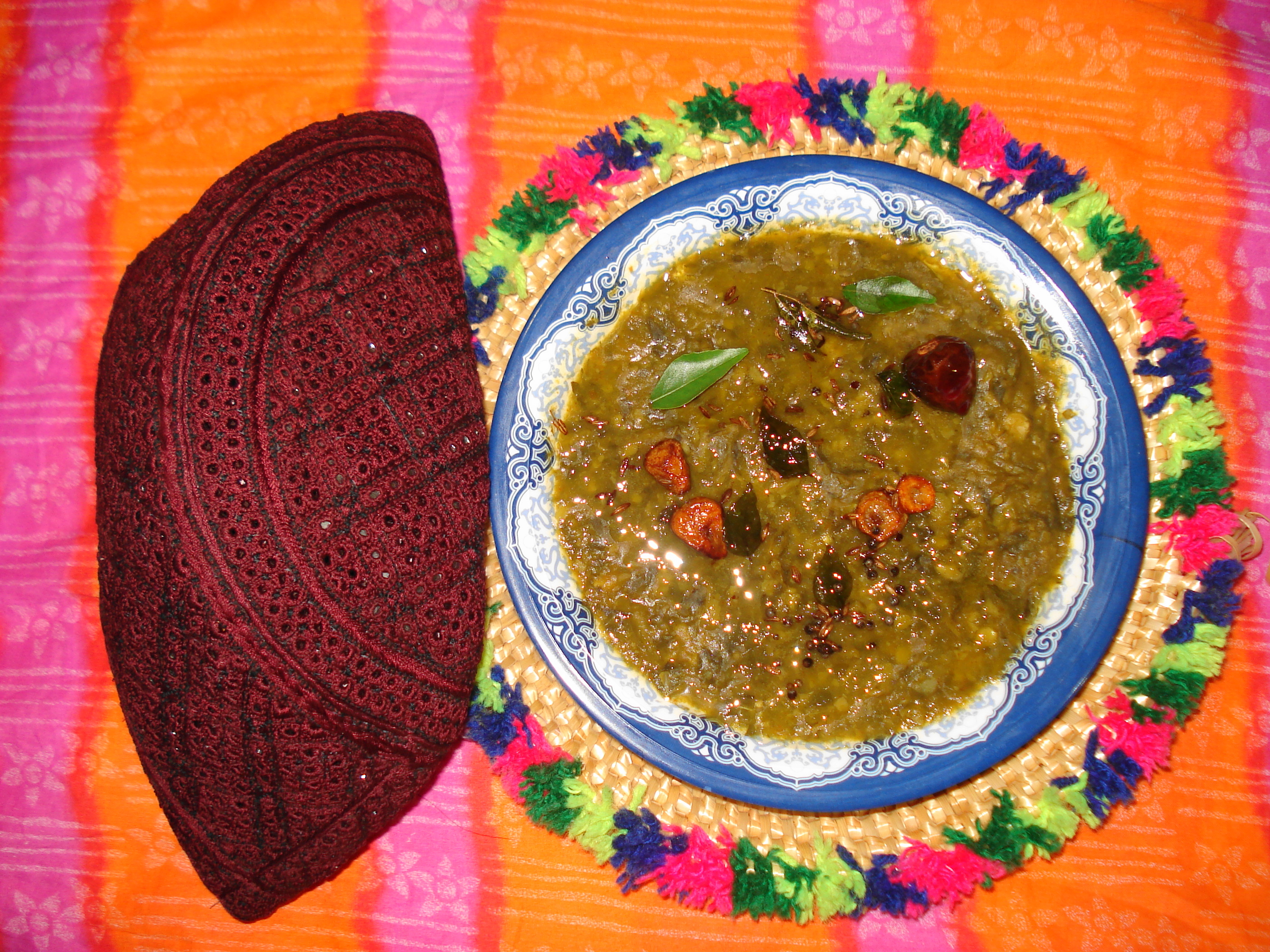
- A plate of sai bhaji next to a Sindhi cap
- Alternative names: Sindhi sai bhaji
- Type: Curry
- Course: Main course
- Place of origin: Sindh, Pakistan
- Region or state: South Asia
- Associated cuisine: Pakistani, Indian
- Main ingredients: Dal, spinach, greens and other vegetables
- Ingredients generally used: cumin seeds, ginger and garlic, chopped onions and tomatoes, water, salt, green chillies, turmeric and coriander powders, red chilli powder, brinjals and potatoes.
- Similar dishes: Sindhi kadhi

Sai bhaji (Sindhi: سائي ڀاڄي) is a Sindhi vegetarian curry, consisting of dal (lentils), palak (spinach) and other vegetables. It forms a staple part of the local cuisine and is considered a rich source of nutrition due to its mix of various greens.

It is a popular household dish in Pakistan, India, and among the Sindhi diaspora.

== Origins ==
The name of the curry is said to be derived from two words of Sindhi language: sai (meaning "green") and bhaji (meaning "vegetables"), thus indicating the ingredients used to cook the dish. Sai bhaji is consumed throughout summers and winters, as a night and day meal respectively. It is favoured due to its healthy nutrition and simplicity of preparation. In the dry regions of interior Sindh, seasonal vegetables are dried and stocked for year-round cooking purposes.

== Ingredients and preparation ==
The main ingredients used in sai bhaji include chopped spinach leaves, as well as smaller quantities of fenugreek, dill and gongura leaves. The greens are mixed with drained lentils (usually channa dal or moong dal) and cooking oil to prepare the stew.

Other ingredients added to the gravy include cumin seeds, ginger and garlic, chopped onions and tomatoes, water, salt, green chillies, turmeric and coriander powders, red chilli powder, brinjals and potatoes. The level of spices used is typically mild. The curry has a smooth and creamy texture once cooked.

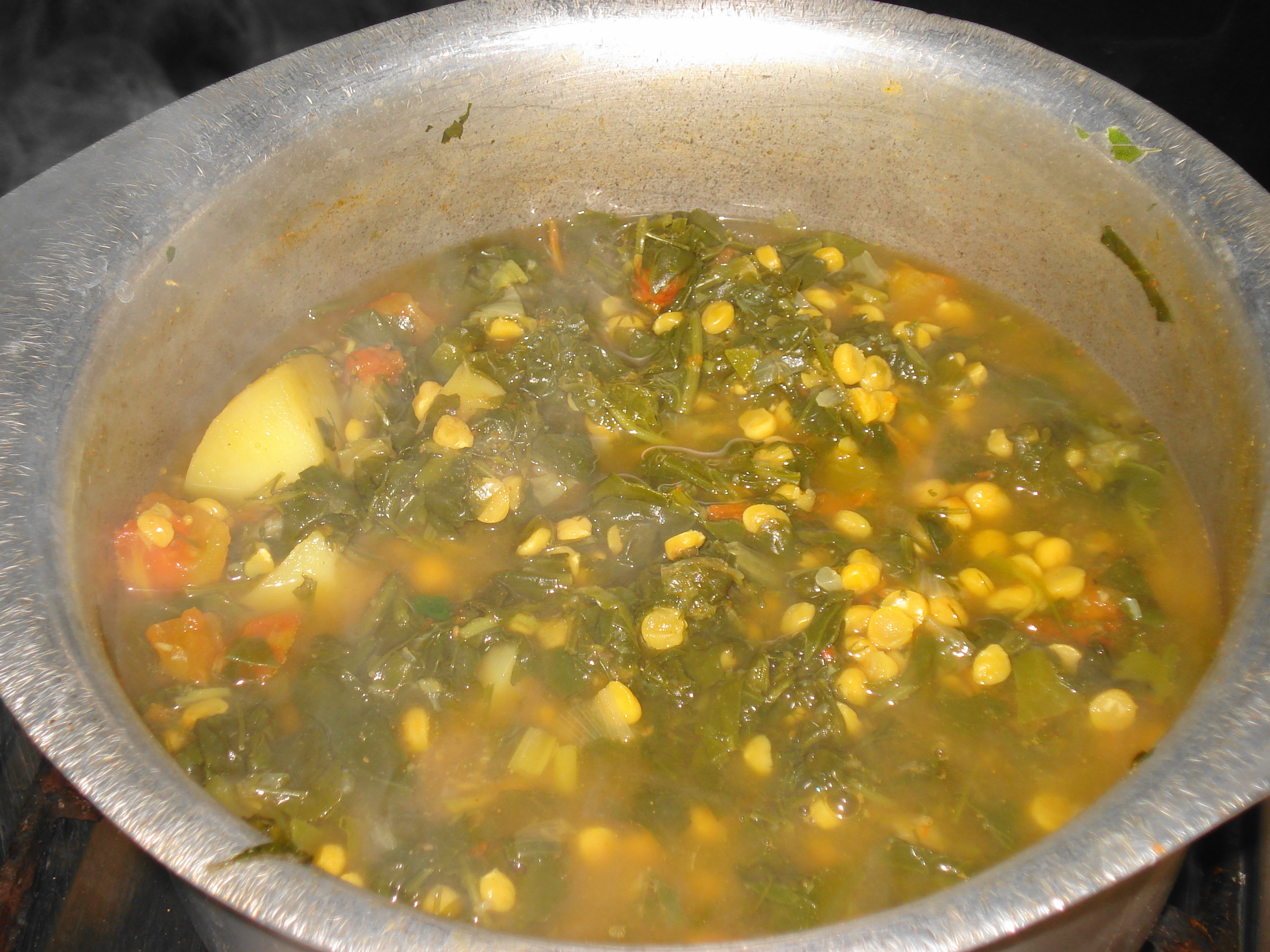
Close-up view of sai bhaji being cooked

== Serving ==
Sai bhaji can be served with basmati rice or bread such as roti. A popular serving combination is with khichdi rice.

== See also ==
- Sindhi cuisine
- Saag
- Pakistani soups and stews
- Pakistani vegetable dishes
- Indian vegetarian cuisine
