= Sindhi biryani =

Sindhi rice cuisine from Pakistan

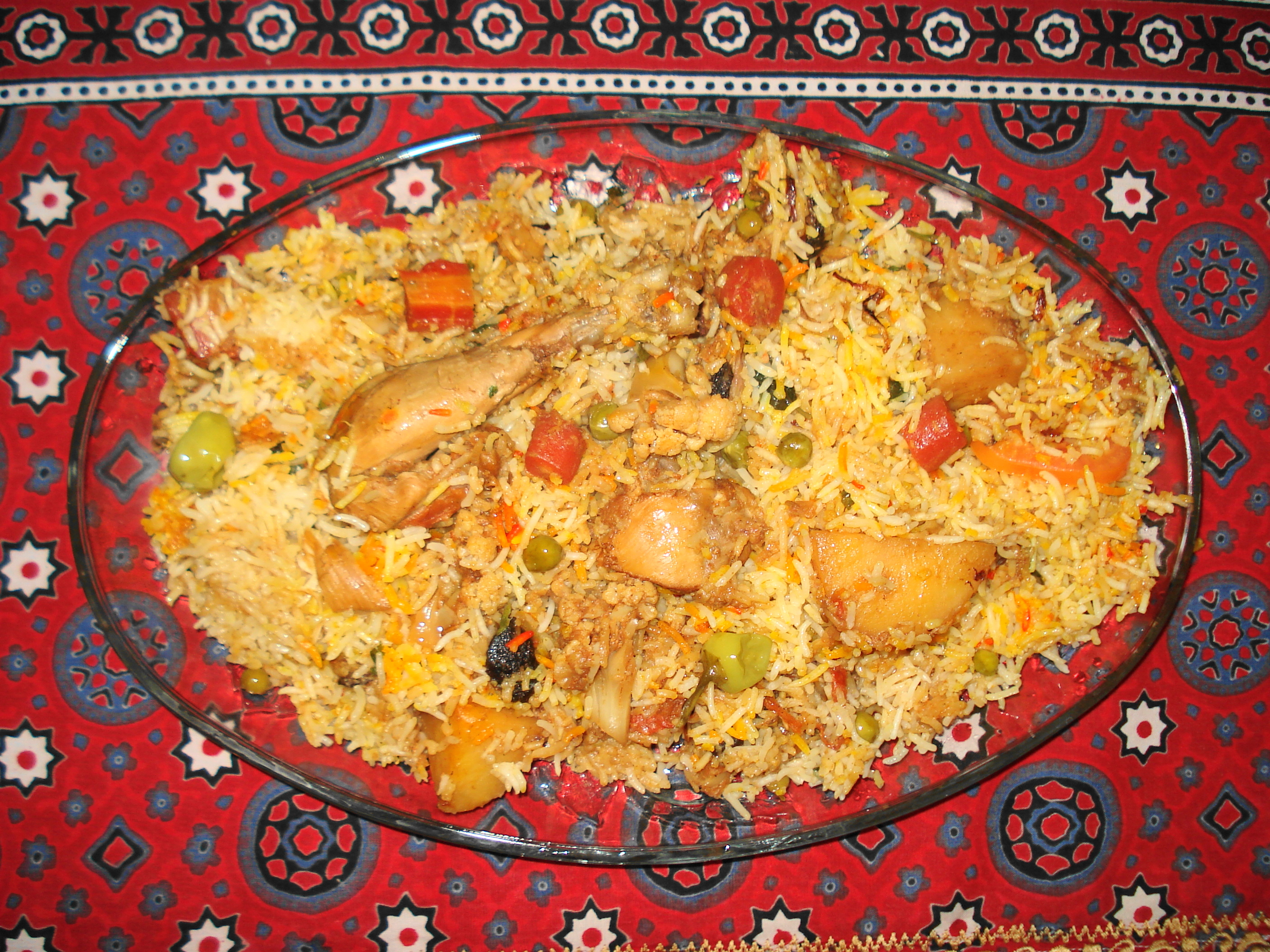
Sindhi biryani

Sindhi biryani (سنڌي برياني) is a meat-and-rice biryani dish originating from the Sindh province of Pakistan. It is one of the most consumed dishes of Pakistani cuisine and Sindhi cuisine. Basic ingredients include mutton, chicken, fish, or shrimp, with basmati rice, potatoes, tomatoes, onions, spices, and yoghurt.

Prunes might be added.

== See also ==
- Pilaf
- Sindhi pulao
