= Sindhi pulao =

Sindhi rice cuisine from Pakistan

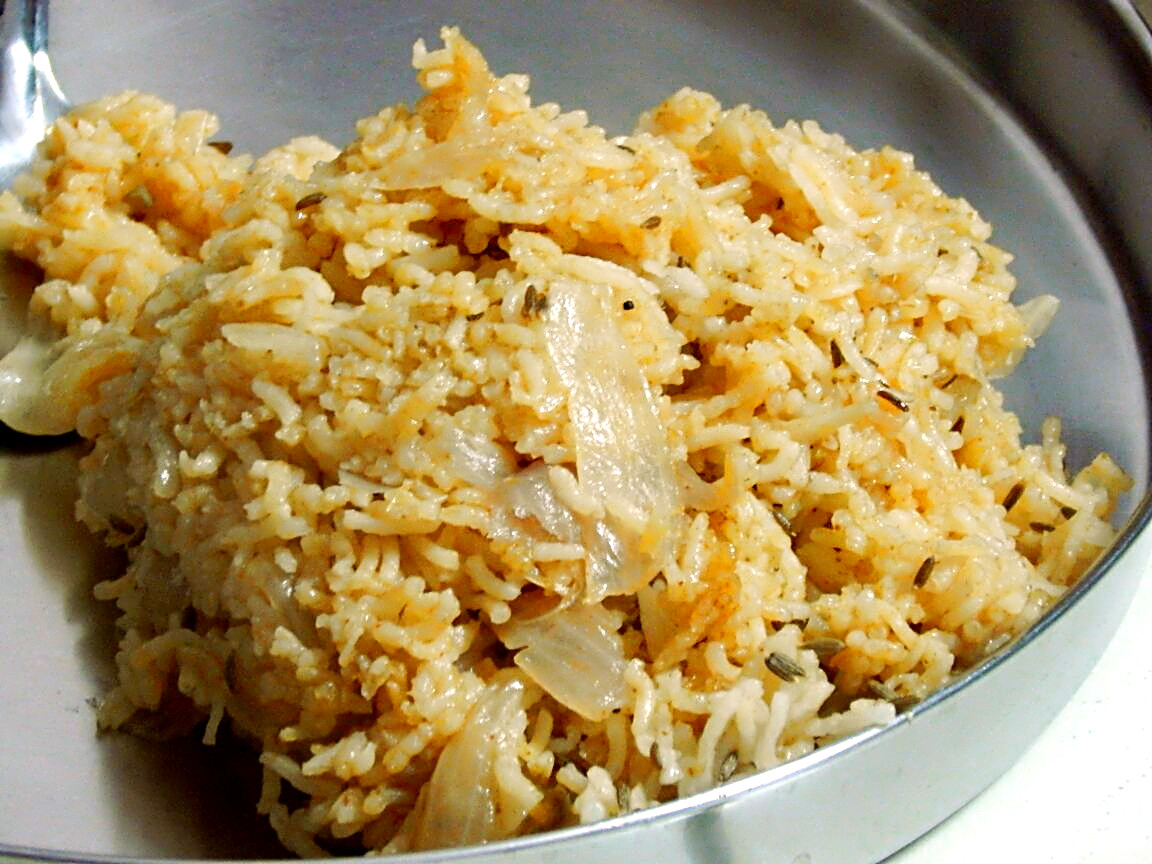
Sindhi Pulao

Sindhi pulao is a type of rice pilaf, prepared with mutton, beef, or chicken. It is prepared by Sindhi people for their marriage ceremonies, condolence meetings, and other occasions.

== See also ==
- Sindhi cuisine
- Sindhi biryani
- Pilaf
