= Sindhi cuisine =

Cuisine of the Sindh, Pakistan

Sindhi cuisine (Sindhi: سنڌي کاڌا) refers to the traditional culinary practices of the Sindhi people, originating in the historical region of Sindh, along the lower Indus River in the northwestern Indian subcontinent, in present-day Pakistan. The cuisine encompasses a variety of vegetarian and non-vegetarian dishes, reflecting the region's agricultural, riverine and pastoral traditions, as well as the diverse cultural and religious practices of its communities.

Sindhi cuisine has developed through centuries of interaction with neighbouring culinary traditions of the Indian subcontinent, particularly those of Punjab, Rajasthan, Gujarat and Kutch. Its culinary influences also include Mughlai traditions and exchanges with regions to the west, including Persia and Central Asia. Trade, migration and cultural interactions across these regions contributed to the development of Sindhi food traditions.

The cuisine includes a diverse range of vegetarian and non-vegetarian preparations. Meat and freshwater fish feature in many Sindhi food traditions, while vegetarian preparations such as Sai bhaji, Sindhi kadhi and Dal pakwan form an important part of the cuisine. Dietary practices vary among Sindhi communities according to religious, regional and cultural traditions.

Following the Partition of India in 1947, Sindhi communities became geographically dispersed, particularly across India and Pakistan. Sindhi migrants carried their culinary traditions to different parts of India and the wider diaspora, where these traditions continued to develop alongside local food cultures.

== Historical influences ==
The arrival of Islam within the Indian subcontinent influenced the local cuisine to a great degree. As Muslims are forbidden to eat pork or consume alcohol and the Halal dietary guidelines are strictly observed, Muslim Sindhis focus on ingredients such as beef, lamb, chicken, fish, vegetables and traditional fruit and dairy. Hindu Sindhi cuisine is almost identical with the difference that beef is omitted. The influence of Central Asian, South Asian and Middle Eastern cuisine in Sindhi food is ubiquitous. Sindhi cuisine was also found in India, where many Sindhi Hindus migrated following the Partition of India in 1947. Before Independence, the State of Sindh was under Bombay Presidency.

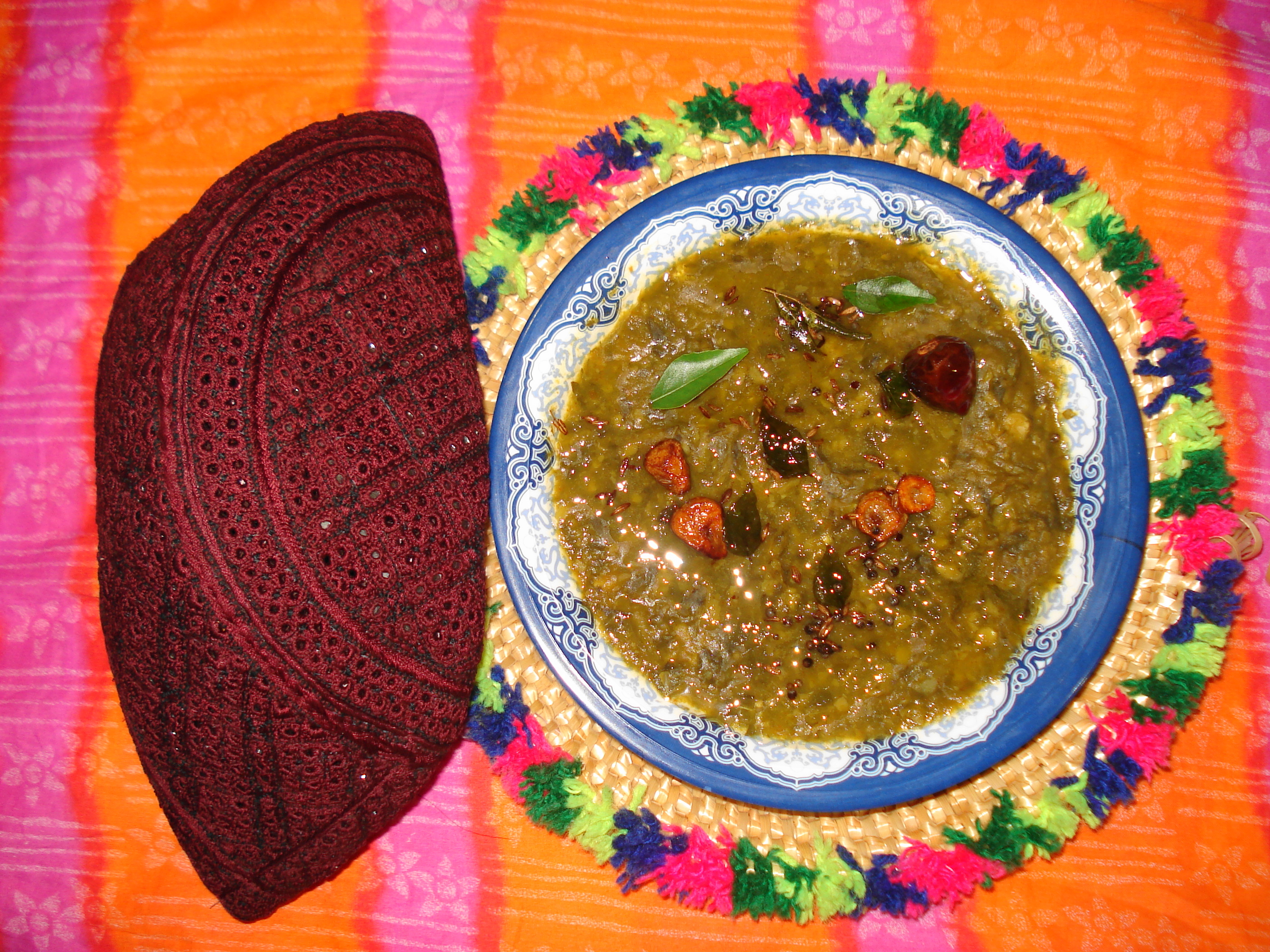
The Sindhi "Sai bhaji" is a famous curry

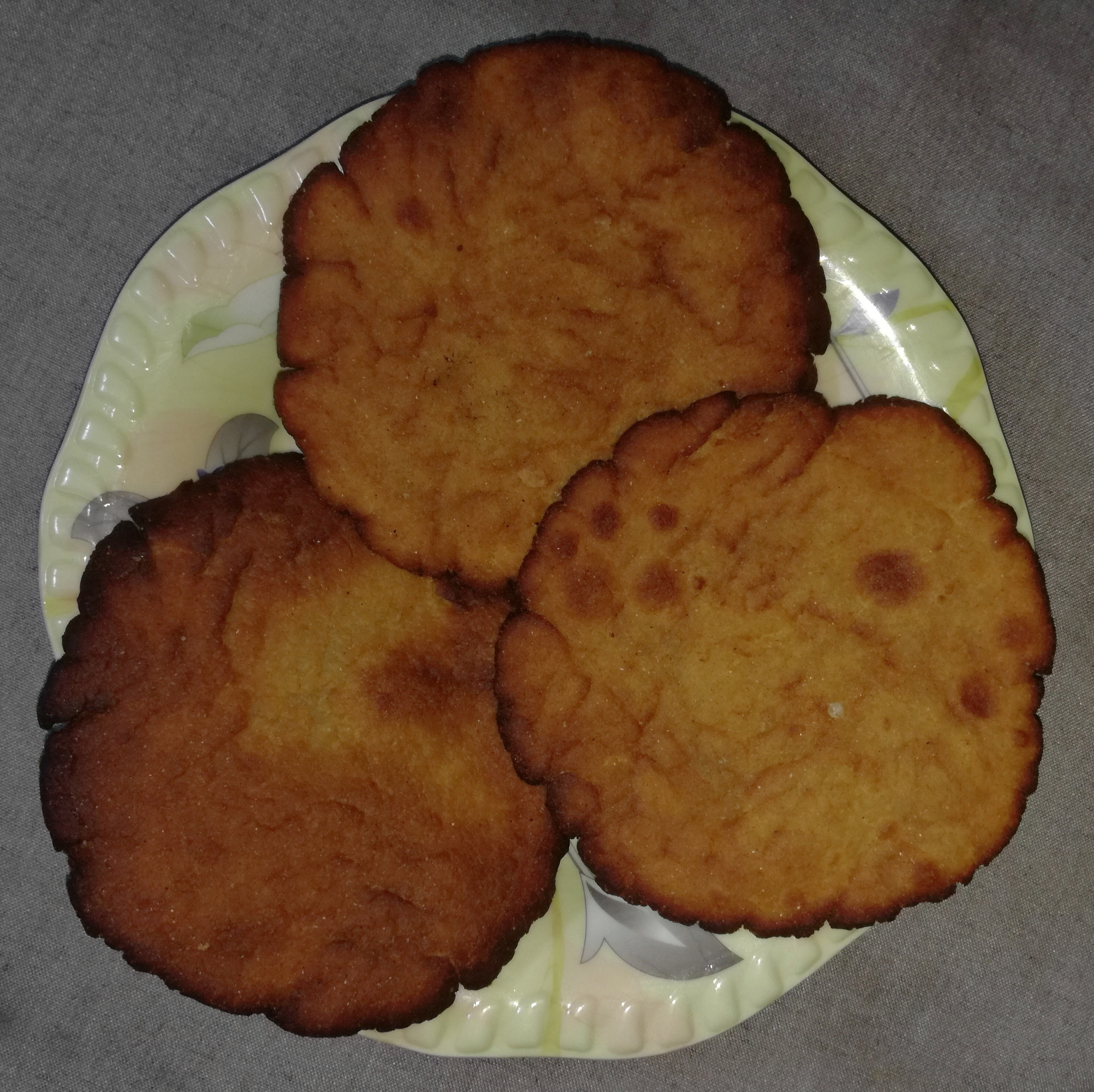
Lola (Lolo in singular) prepared on Thadri festival in Tharparkar

== Food for special occasions ==
Certain dishes are served on special occasions such as Diwali. A Bahji (vegetable dish) called Chiti-Kuni is made with seven vegetables. Special dishes are also served on recovery from serious illness for example when someone makes a full recovery from Chicken Pox, it is common to make an offering and make "mitho lolo", a sweet griddle-roasted flatbread: the dough is wheat flour mixed with oil (or ghee) and sugar syrup flavored with ground cardamom.

- Sai Bhaji ain Chawar: Sai bhaji a popular dish from Sindh consists of white steamed rice served with spinach curry which is given a 'tarka' with tomatoes, onions and garlic.
- Daal Pakwan: (mostly consumed by Sindhi Hindus).
- Koki: is another popular Sindhi flat-bread that is prepared with wheat flour and goes well with any dal, sabzi or even curd or chai.
- Sayun (Vermicelli): typically served as a sweetened (sometimes milk-based) dessert, is popular: Hindu Sindhis serve it on many special occasions such as Thadri and Cheti Chand. Muslim Sindhis serve it on Bakra-Eid and Eid ul-Fitr. On special religious occasions, mitho lolo, accompanied with milk, is given to the poor.

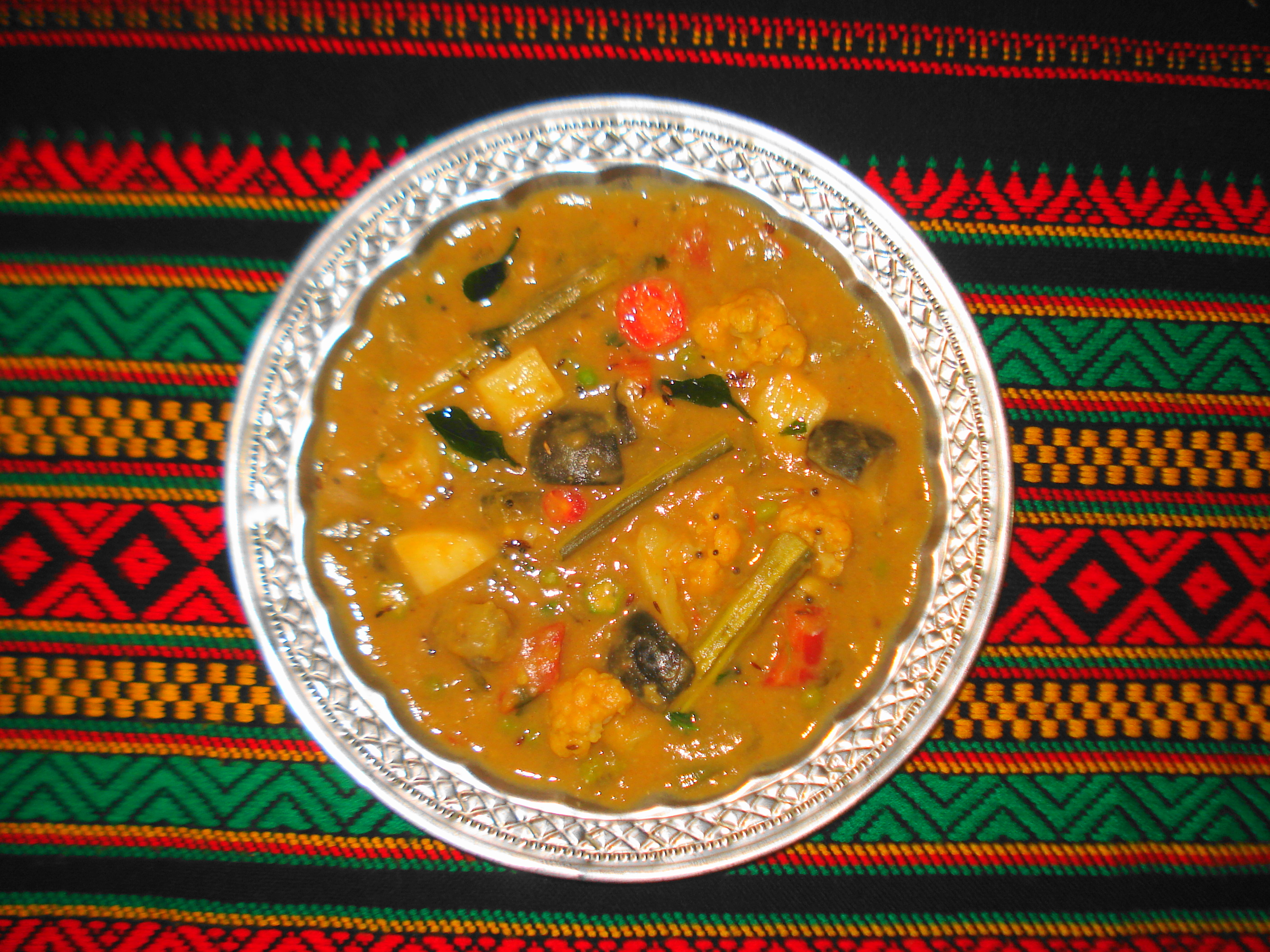
Sindhi Kadhi

- Sindhi Kadhi: is a unique and special dish prepared on festive occasions specially by Sindhis residing in India. It consists of a thick spicy gravy made from chick pea flour unlike buttermilk usually used for kadi preparation along with seasonal vegetables. It is served hot with rice.
- Mitho Lolo: is also served with chilled buttermilk called Matho on various occasions.
- Kheer Kharkoon: A special sweet dish called 'Kheer Kharkun' are prepared and served on Eid ul-Fitr, it is prepared by mixing dates and milk, and slowly simmering the mixture for few hours. The dish is eaten hot in winters and cold in summers.
- Khorak/Churo: a healthy snack made for bride and bridegroom before marriage, it is made of dry fruits and desi ghee, it is given to bride and bridegroom for seven days.

== Main dishes ==
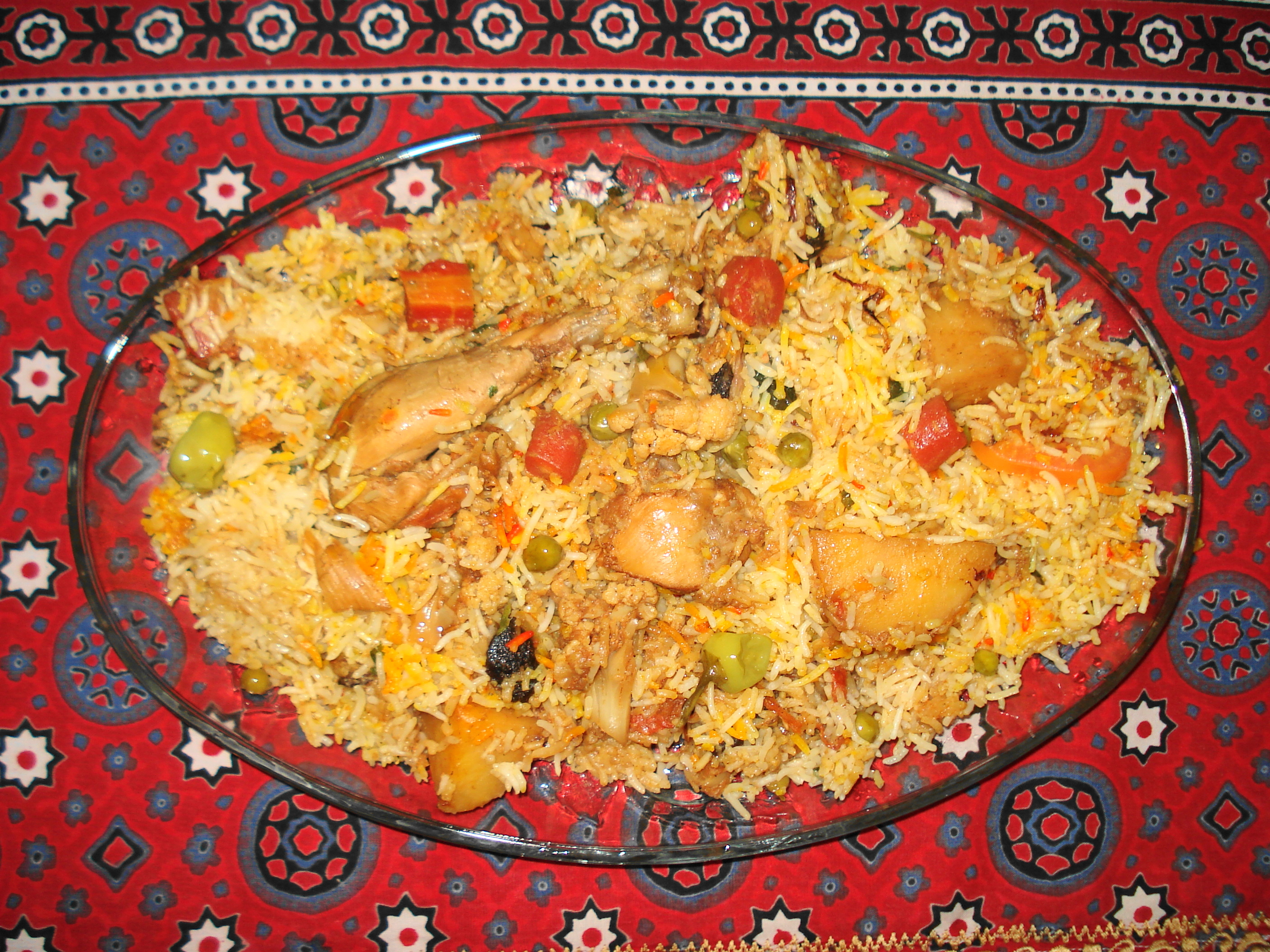
Sindhi biryani, the Sindhi variant of the biryani rice dish

- Sindhi Biryani: is a special meat and rice biryani, the most popular dish in Sindh and Pakistan.
- Sindhi Pulhao Bhat: It is Sindhi style Pilaf, it made in mutton, beef, chicken or only in potatoes or chana/chhola, it is less heavy with masalas than Sindhi Biryani.
- Taryal Patata: also called Took Aloo, a staple of Sindhi diet, is a form of thinly sliced, pan fried or deep fried potatoes with local spices. They are consumed in most rural households typically at dinner but can be consumed even for breakfast and lunch alongside other meals. One popular Sindhi way of having "patatas" is to eat it with plain white rice with daal to accompany it.

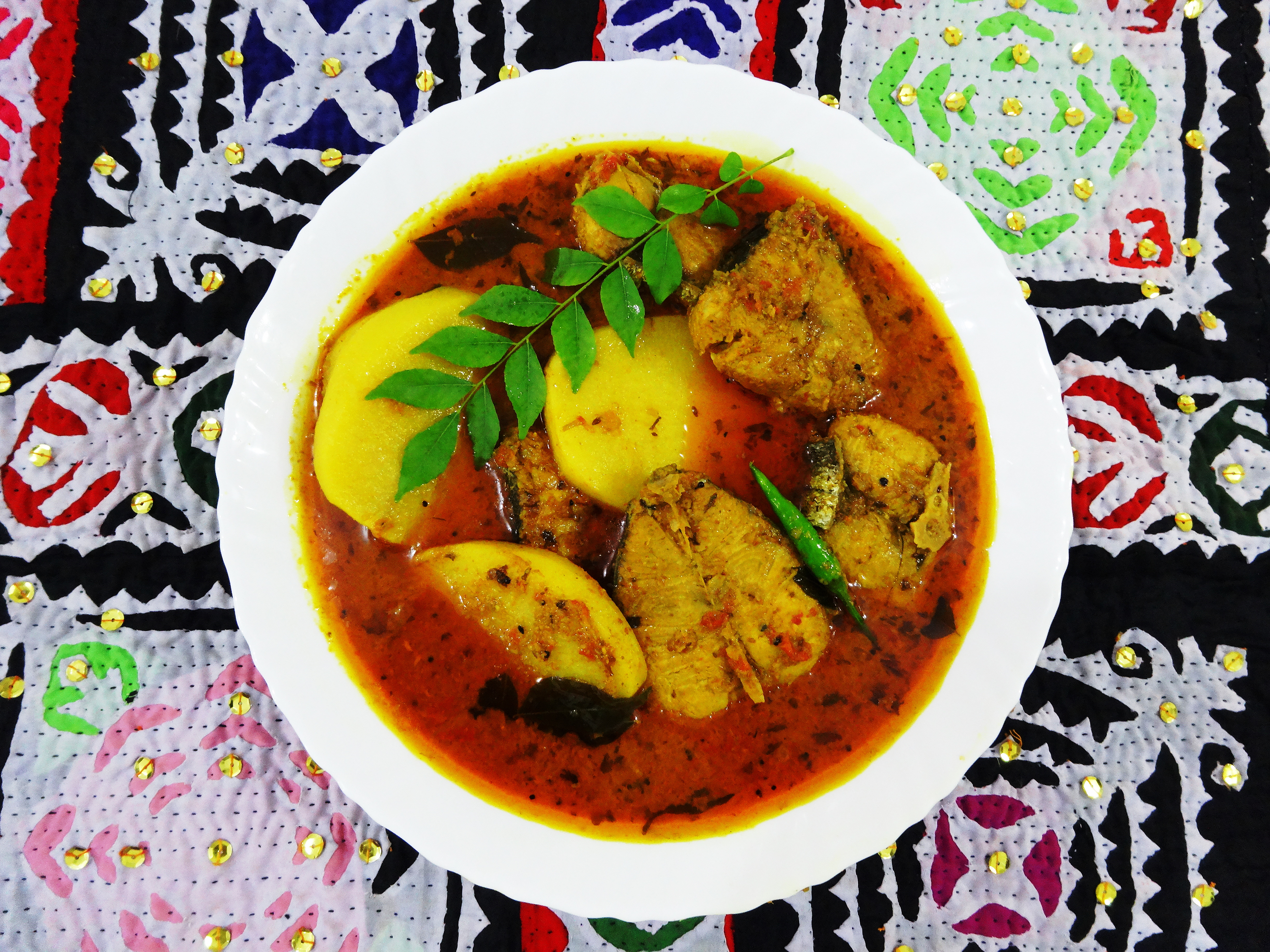
Sindhi Fish Curry

- Pallo Machi: is a popular Sindhi delicacy, is Hilsha fish prepared with numerous cooking methods. It can be deep fried and garnished with local spices, can be cooked with onions and potatoes into a traditional fish meal or barbequed. The fish often has roe, which is called "aani" in Sindhi and is enjoyed as a delicacy. Often fried alongside the palla and served with the fish fillets.
- Palli: is a saag or leafy green from the Chickpeas, and is enjoyed either cooked by itself like spinach or with fish cooked in the palli and called "Machi Palli". The saag has a unique flavor and is quite different from spinach or mustard saag and has a slightly sour and salty taste to it. It can take getting used to for the uninitiated.

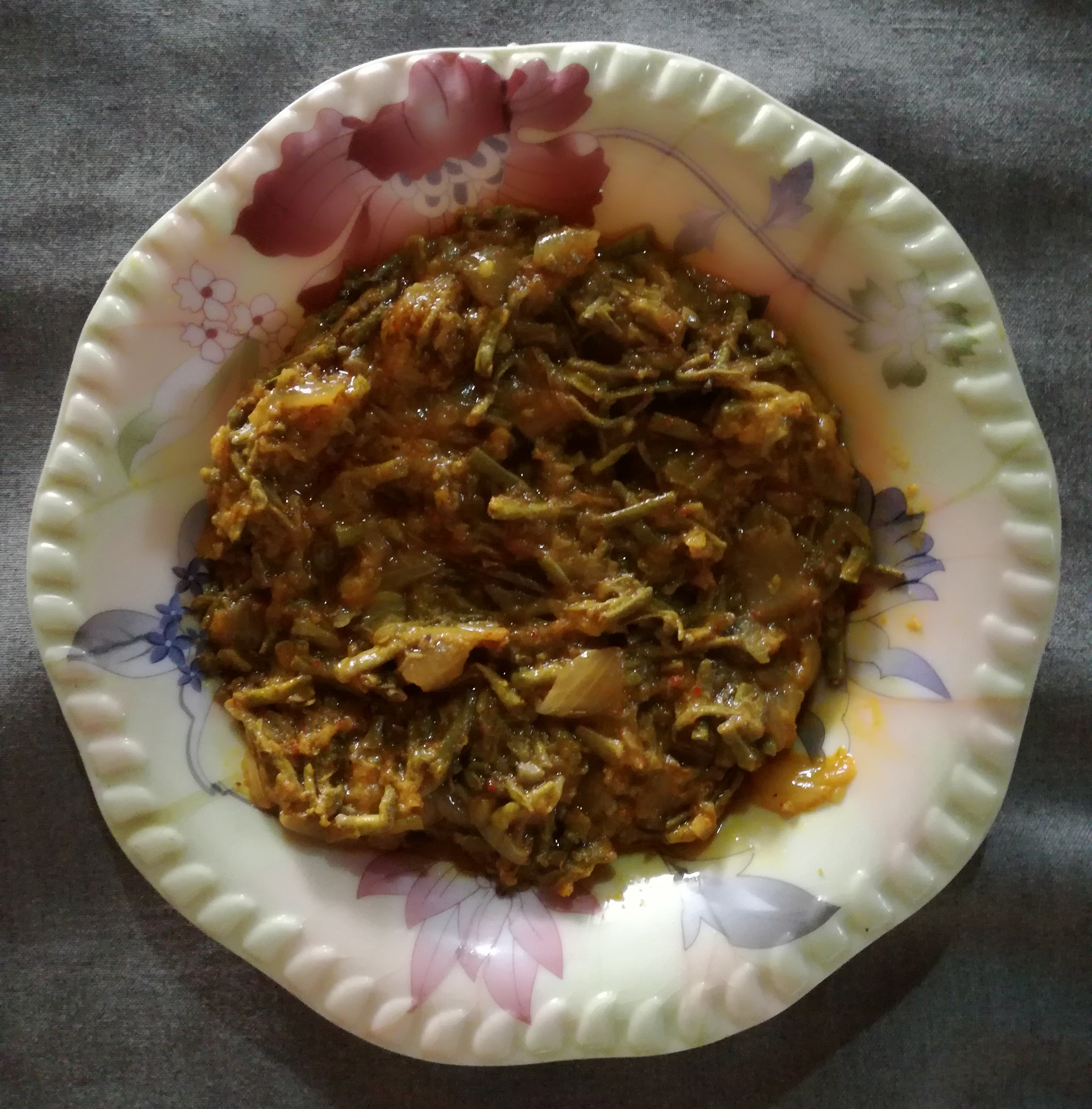
Famous Thari Singhrian ji Bhaaji

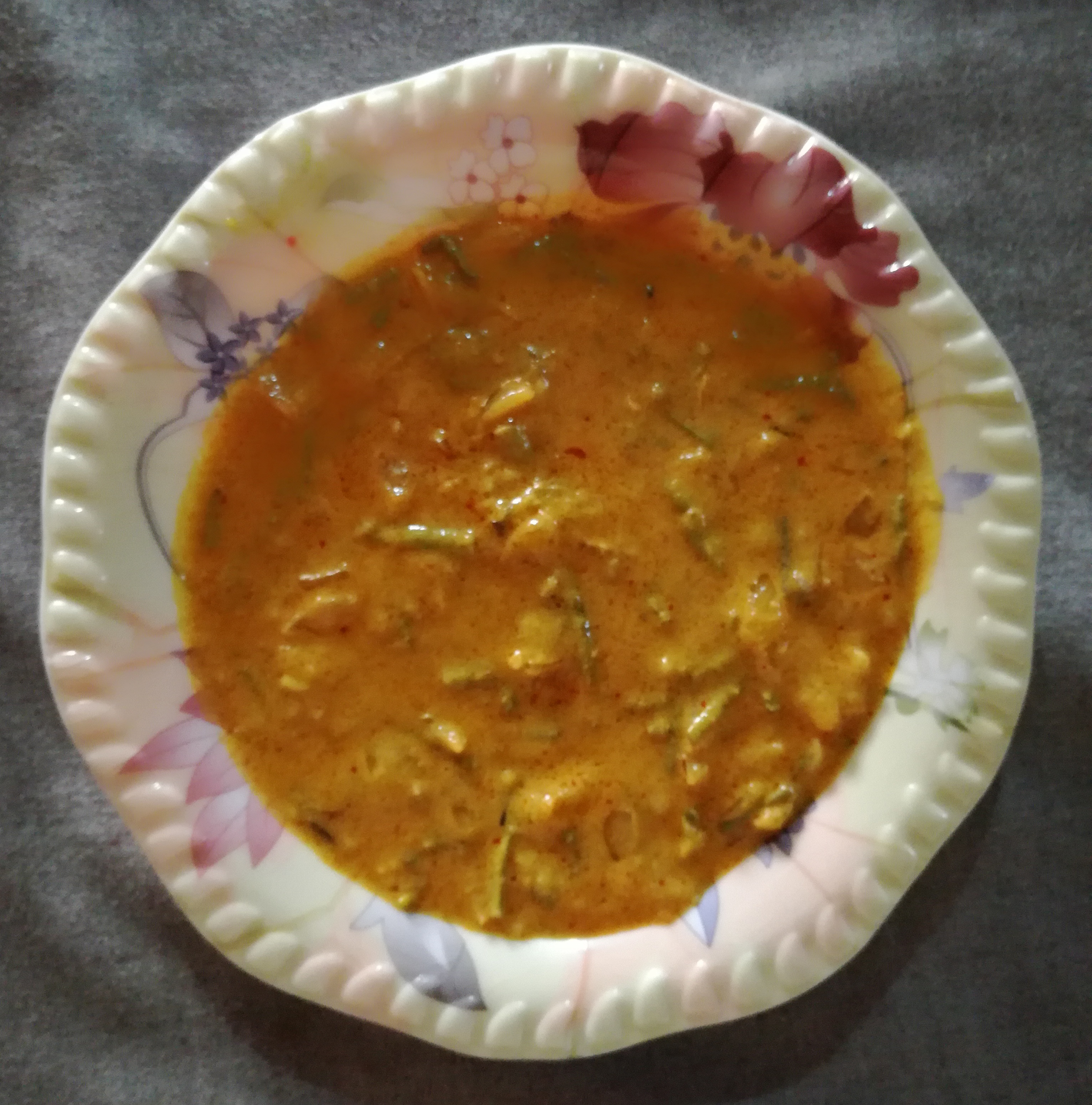
Most popular Kadhi dish Singhrian jo Raabro(Khaatiyo) from Tharparkar

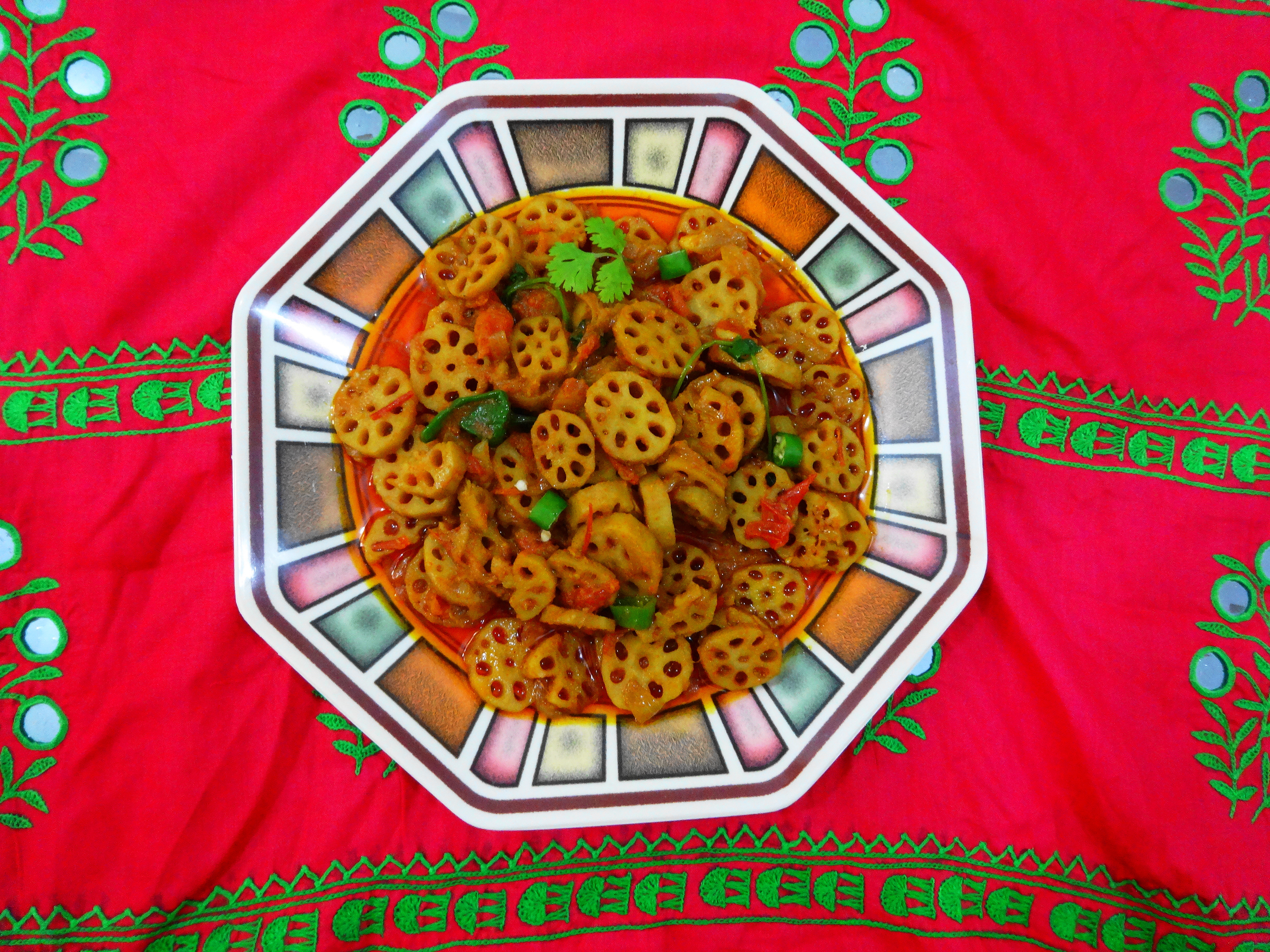
Sindhi Beeh Ji Bhaji

- Bheeh Bhajji: ('lotus root' in English). A high quality lotus root is grown in the north of Sindh which is then cooked in clay-pot using various spices, which then results in an excellent delicacy that is famous all over Pakistan.
- Sindhi Curry:
- Sabu Dal Chawar: yellow daal with rice).
- Sai Bhaji: Vegetarian curry which is mostly made with dal (lentil) and spinach

== Meat ==
Most Pakistani Sindhis are Muslims, they consume different animals, birds and fish meat which are Halal. Common meat like chicken, beef, mutton is quite famous among Pakistani Muslim Sindhis, in addition camel, rabbit, many birds like Aari (Fulica atra), Kunj (Demoiselle crane), Titar (Grey francolin), Jhirkri (Sparrow), Duck meat is also consumed. many seafood like fishes, prawns etc. are also eaten. The fish Sajji of Sanghar is quite famous all over Pakistan.

== Drinks ==
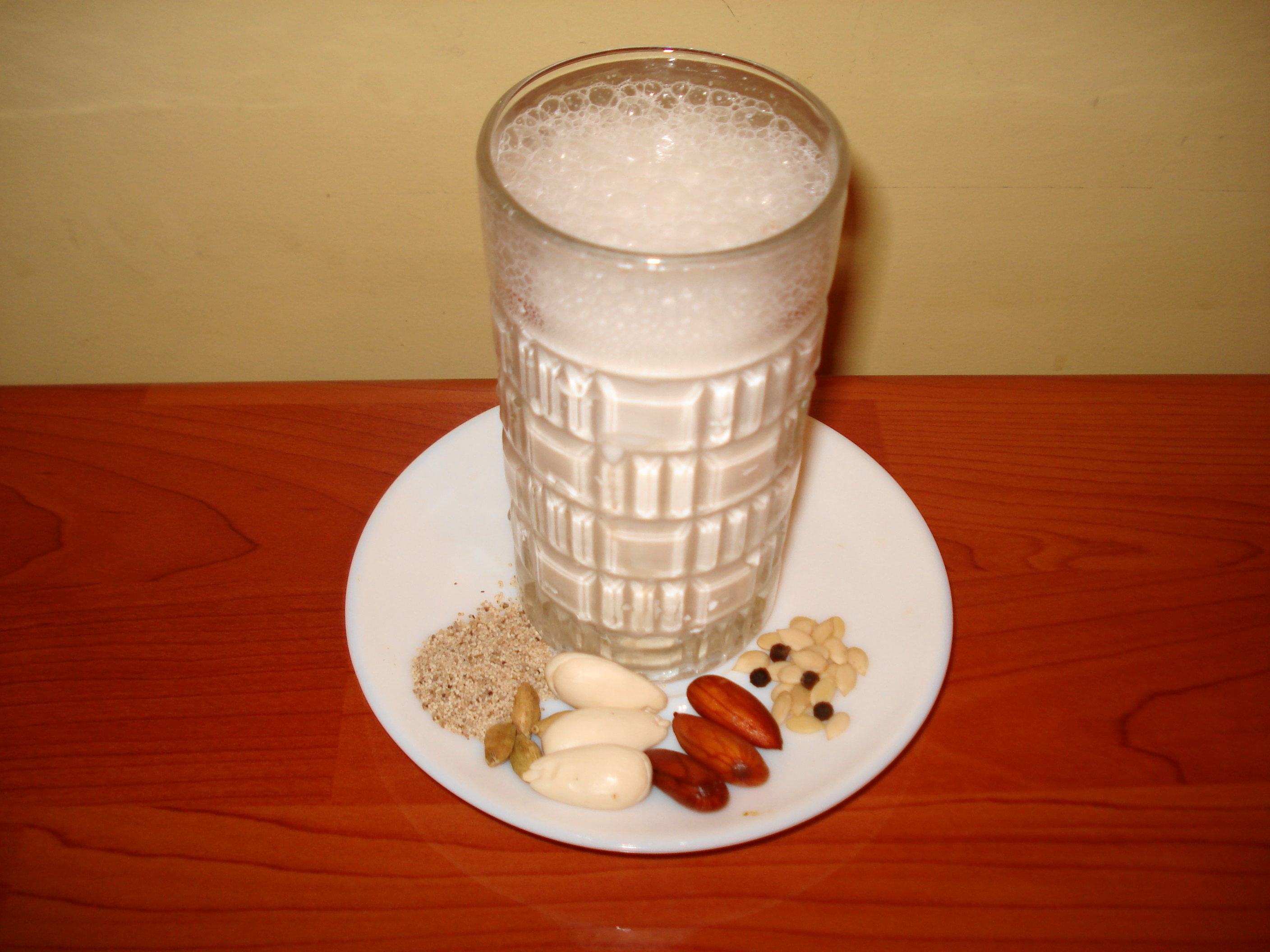
Thadal.

- Thadal: is a cooling and energizing drink, used by the pehlwan (wrestlers), prepared using ground char magaz, dry fruits, pepper, almonds and poppy seeds – khashkhaash).
- Sharbat: drink made from rose petals or sandal wood.
- Falooda: vermicelli and ice on top of an Ice cream.
- Lassi: Dahi (yogurt)-based traditional drink.

== Desserts ==
- Khirni: hot sweet pudding made with milk and crushed rice into paste, flavours of cardamoms, dry fruits and saffron.
- Busri: a special Sindhi sweet bread made of two breads, filled with powder of jaggery called musti/mithai sometimes with sugar, and a chunk of desi ghee or Makhan (butter) on top, eaten mostly in winters, also offered to bride and bridegroom on wedding day.
- Ugham Halwo: is a traditional halwa made in Dadu district, made with almonds, pistachios, cashew nuts and important (ugham seeds) are used in desi ghee, it is very healthy and best in winters.
- Sindhi Halwo: made with corn flour, water, ghee and dry fruits, it has jelly like texture.
- Mao: is a sweet dish made out of milk and sugar, milk is cooked until it becomes thick paste, then it is served with dry fruits and nuts. Mehar city is famous for making Sindhi mao.
- Tairee Bhat: the sweet rice made in jaggery with kishmish (Raisins) and coconut.
- Borindo: round balls like sweet snack made of sugar syrup/honey/jaggery and sesame seeds or other dry fruits and nuts.
- Lai: same as like borindas but flat and Lais are made of different dry fruits, sesame seeds etc.
- Kutti: Mashed Ofrato (Paratha Bread) with sugar, butter and crushed dry fruits.
- Lolo or Mitho Lolo: Sweeter version of koki – also made if you get chicken pox.
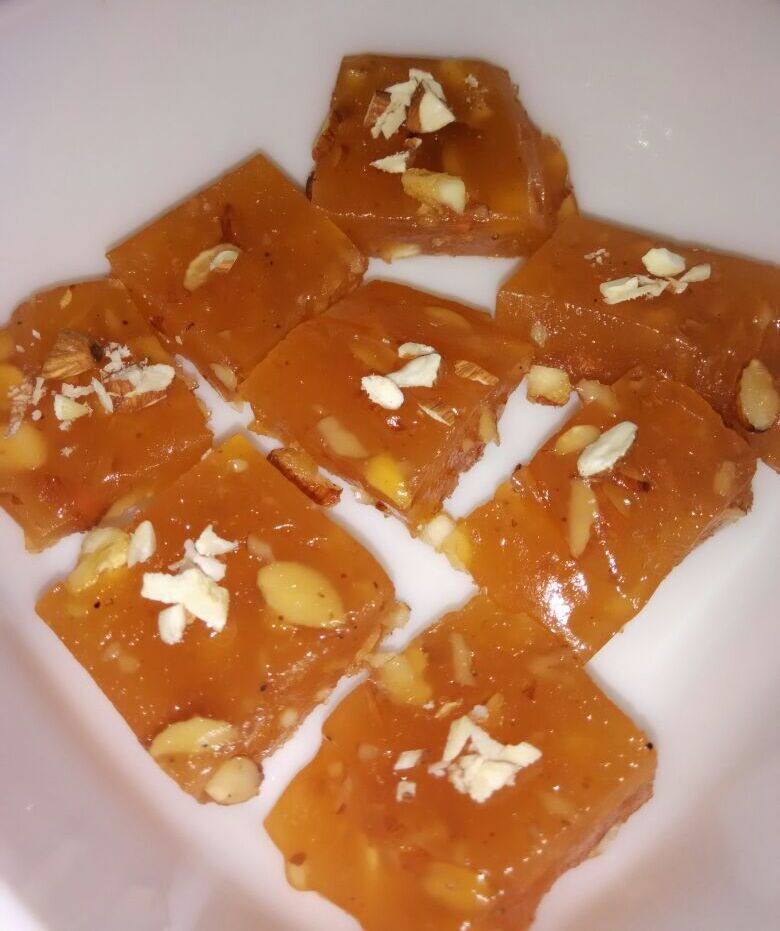
  Sindhi Halwo (Corn flour halwa)
- Chulho: is a sweet bread of rice flour or wheat flour with sugar sprinkled on top, with desi ghee or makhan.
- Gheeyar: a Jalebi like Sindhi sweet but large in size, eaten on festivals.
- Ghotki ja Pera: are usually cone shaped sweetmeat made in ghotki city.

Other Sindhi desserts and sweets like Sero, Paihu, Rabri, Atay ju Saiyun, Bondi Singhar, Daro, Kariyio tikio etc.

== Snacks ==
- Pappad: a thin flat bread like snack, made of urad dal, moong dal with pepper, jeera, eaten with meal, or at evening with tea.
- Khicha: is like pappad but made with rice flour and is less spicy, eaten with Chutney.
- Pakora: are fritters, can be made with sliced potatoes called Patatai or with onions, pea and green chili pakoras called Sanna/Sanai pakora, Green chili pakoras called Mirchai pakora, chicken pakora, beef pakoras, Bheeh (lotus root) pakoras etc.
- Buri/Boorani: is unique snack of yellow powder or pollen of flower that grows in lakes and ponds.
- Pabura/Pabur: the seeds of Lotus flower.
- Phariyun: is a winter snack, a green pods boiled in water and sprinkled with ambchoor, black salt and red chili powder.
- Gajar: boiled sweet potatoes, sprinkled with salt, black, red chili powder and ambchoor.
- Baisan ju Tikyun: flatbread like snack made of Chickpea flour with coriander, onions, salt, pepper.

== Translations ==
This section provides the translations between Urdu/Hindi, Sindhi and English (British and American) cooking terms of common Sindhi food.

There are occasional differences in Sindhi dialects for instance Hyderabadi Sindhi will refer to an egg as 'bedo' however Sindhis from other parts will refer to it as 'aano'.

Herbs

Urdu/Hindi	Sindhi	English
Sokha Dhan-ia	Sukka Dhaanna (سڪاڌاڻا)	Coriander Seed
Hara Dhan-ia	Sawa Dhaanna	Coriander Leaves
Podeena	Phodno	Mint leaves
Methi	Hurbo	Fenugreek
Taez paat	Kamaal Pat	Bay leaf
Kadhi pata	Kari patto	Curry Leaves

Spices

Urdu/Hindi	Sindhi	English
Amchoor	Amba-choor	dry mango powder
Elaichi	Photo (ڦوٽا)	Cardamon Pods
Badi elaichi	Wado photo	Black Cardamon
Namak	Loonn/Noonn (لوڻ)	Salt
Kali mirch	Kaara Mirch	Black Pepper
Lah-sun	Thoom (ٿوم)	Garlic
Adrak	Adrak (ادرڪ)	Ginger
Zeera	Jiro (جيرو)	Cummin Seeds
Haldi	Haidda (هيڊ)	Turmeric Powder
Heeng	Hing/Vagaranee	Asafoetida
Zafran	Zafran/Kaisar(ڪيسر)	Saffron
Gur	Gud (ڳڙ)	Jaggery
Mirch	Mirch (مرچ)	chillies
Imli	Gida-mi-ri (گدامڙي)	Tamarind
Khaskhas (کسکس)	Khashkhash	poppy seeds
	Pulao Jeeri	Caraway
Raee	Rai	mustard seeds
Long	Lua-nga (لونگ)	Clove
Til	Tirr	Sesame Seed
Garam Masala	Garam masalo	.
Dalchini	Mithi Kathi/Darchini	Cinnamon
Sauf	Sonf	Aniseed
Methi dana	Hurbo	Fenugreek seeds
Lal mirch	Gharo mirch	Red Chilli

Fruit, Vegetable and Pulses

Urdu/Hindi	Sindhi	English
Baingan	Vaangann واڱڻ	Aubergine (UK) or Eggplant (US).
Band Gobi	Band/Pata Gobi	Cabbage
Gaajar	Gajjar (گجر)	Carrot
Daal	Daal	Lentil
Sag	Saagg	Mustard Greens (Vegetable)
Khajoor	Qatal or Khaarak (کارڪ يا ڪتل)	Dates

Nuts

Urdu/Hindi	Sindhi	English
Moongphali	Behi-munga or Munghera (مڱيرا) Kha-ja	Peanuts
Kaju	Khaaja	Cashewnuts
Badaam	Badaamyoon (باداميون)	Almond
Pista	Pista/Dodiyun	Pistachio
Akhrot	Akhrot	Walnut

Other

Urdu /Hindi	Sindhi	English
Ghee	Gheehu/Ghay	Clarified Butter
Chapati/ Roti	Maani/Phulko/Daggri/ Daggar (ڦلڪو)	Thin wrap
Cheeni or Shakkar	Khand(کنڊ), Khandre	Sugar
Bheja or Maghaz	Maghz (مغز), Mejalo	Brain
Papar	Pa-pper(پاپڙ)	Poppodum
Double-roti	Dab-roti/Dhabbal	Bread
Aata	Atto(اٽو)	Wholewheat flour (Chappati flour)
Anda	Bedo (Hyderbadi Sindhi) or Ando, Ano(آنو)	Egg
Murghi	Kukkar (ڪڪڙ)	Chicken
Paplate	Paplet پاپليٽ	Pomfret fish
Chhota Gosht	Nandho Gosht	Mutton
Barra Gosht	Wado Gosht	Beef
Palla machhli	Pallo(پلو)	shad/Hilsa (fish)

== Vegetarian cuisine ==
Certain sects of the Sindhi community are vegetarians. The Thathai, Halai and Kutchi Bhatias are followers of Vallabh Acharya, who put forward a way to worship Sri Krishna called Pushtimarg. They are strict vegetarians who do not eat even onions and garlic and are devoted to Srinathji, the child form of Sri Krishna.

A commonly eaten vegetarian dish in Sindhi cuisine is sai bhaji, made from leafy greens, lentils, and vegetables, and typically served with rice.

== Sindhi pickles ==
Sindhi achar is made of different vegetables and fruits like: Carrot pickle, Mango pickle, Mix fruit pickle, turnip pickle, Green chilli pickle etc., Shikarpur is famous for Sindhi achar.

== Gallery ==
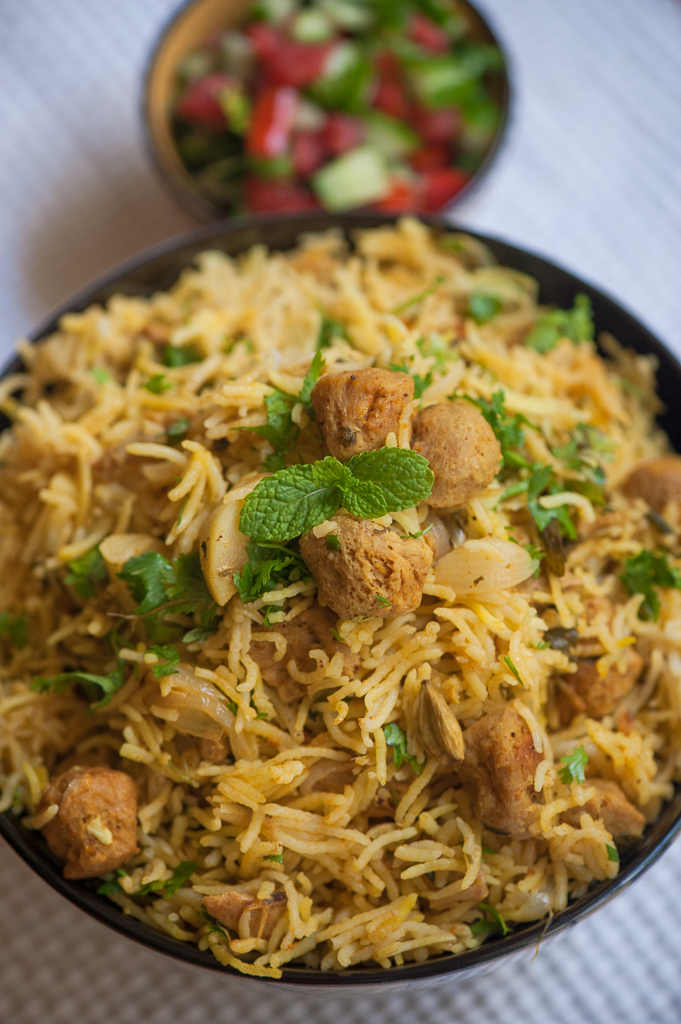
Sindhi Pulao.

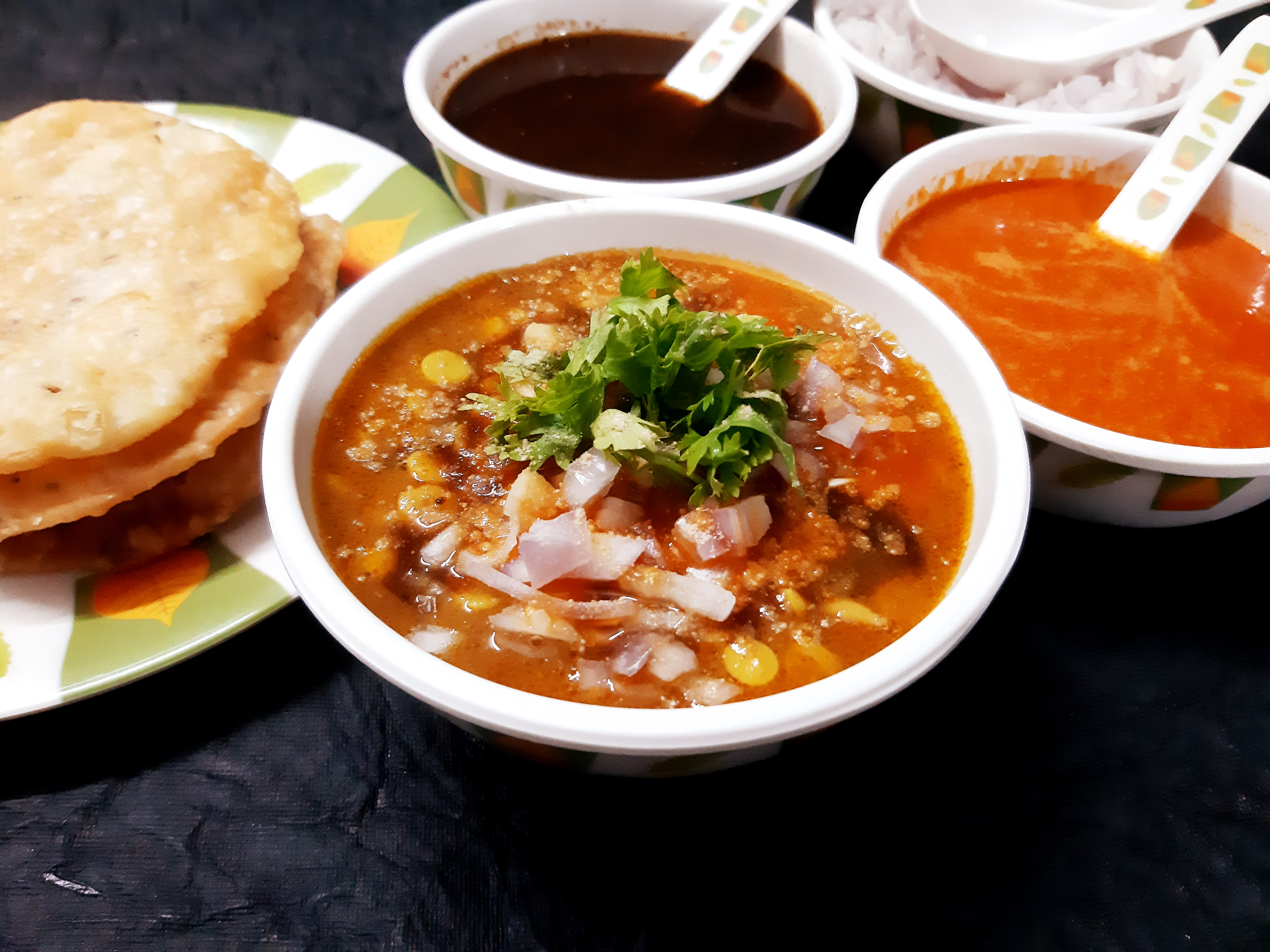
Sindhi Dal Pakwan.

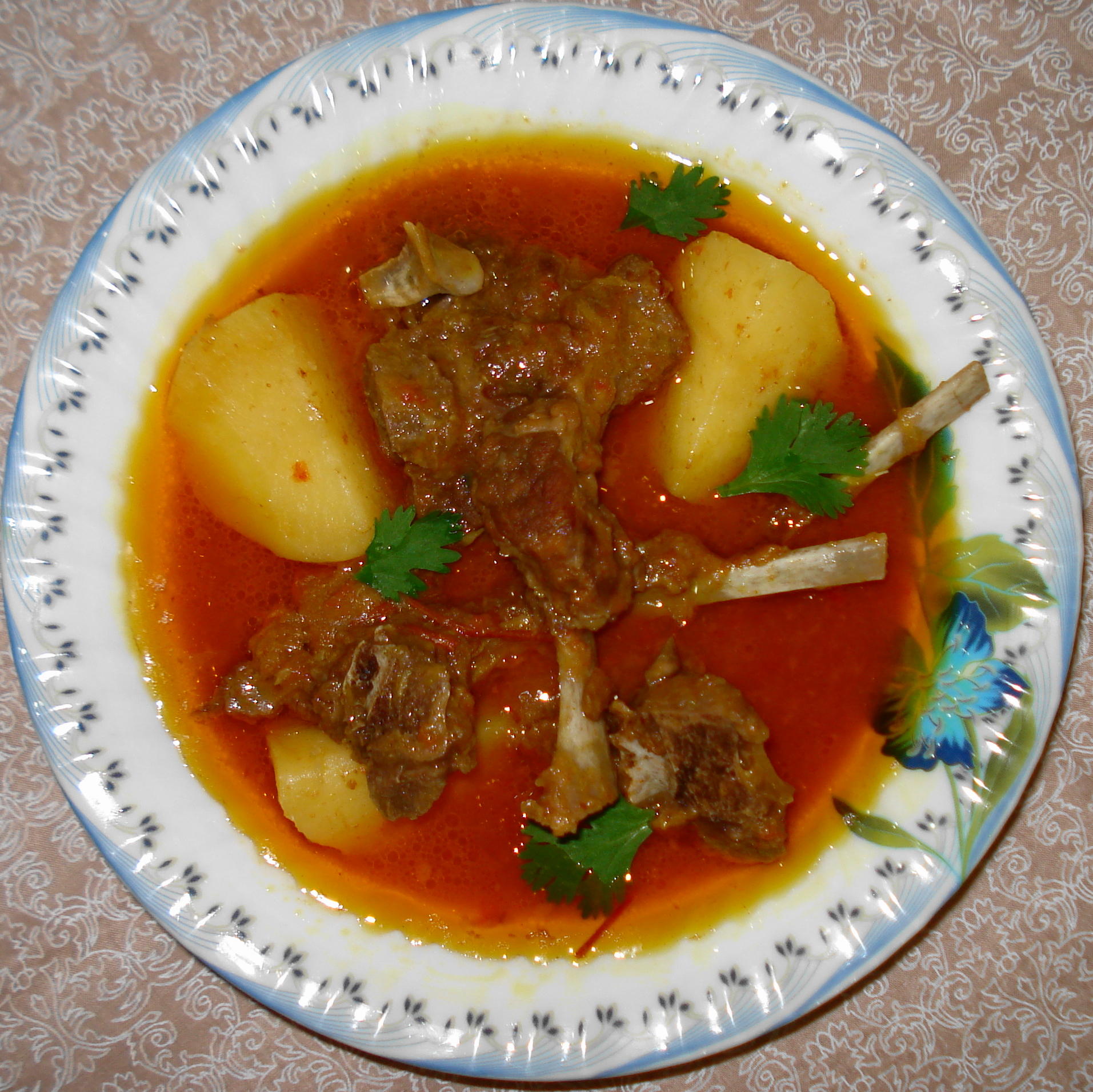
Sindhi Gosht Batalu (meat curry)

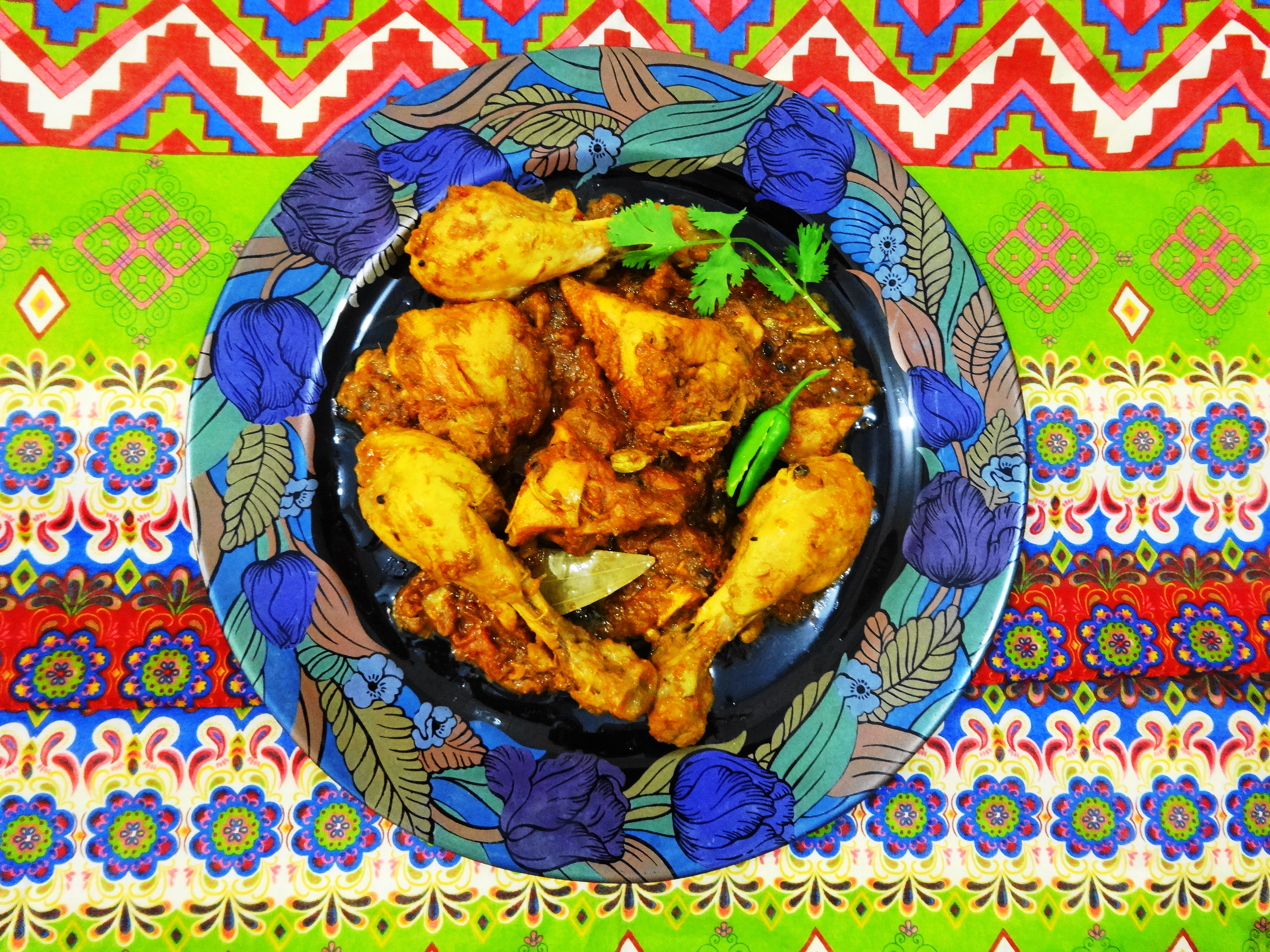
Sindhi Seyal Murgh (Chicken) dish

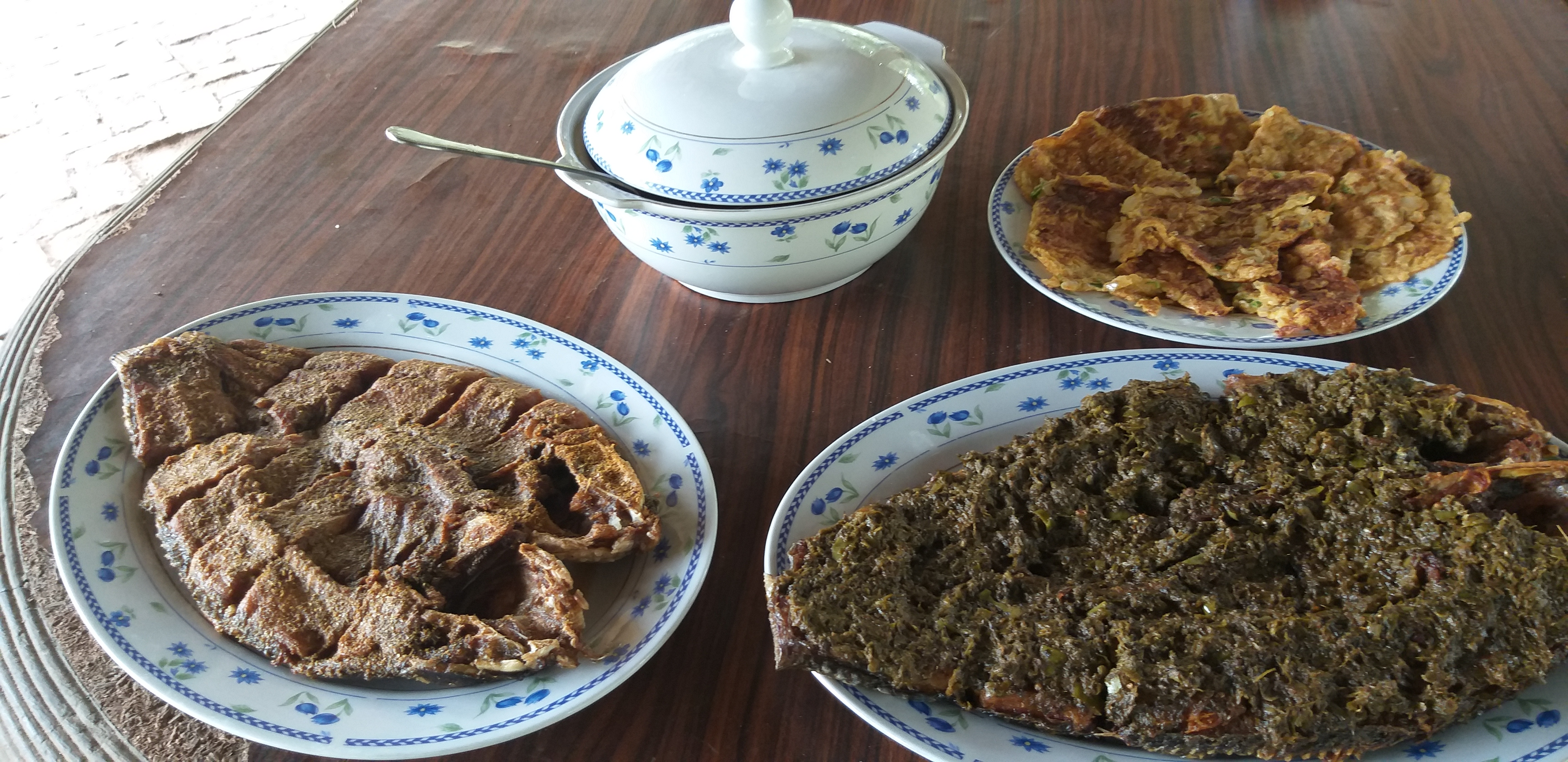
River fish layered with ground mustard leaves.

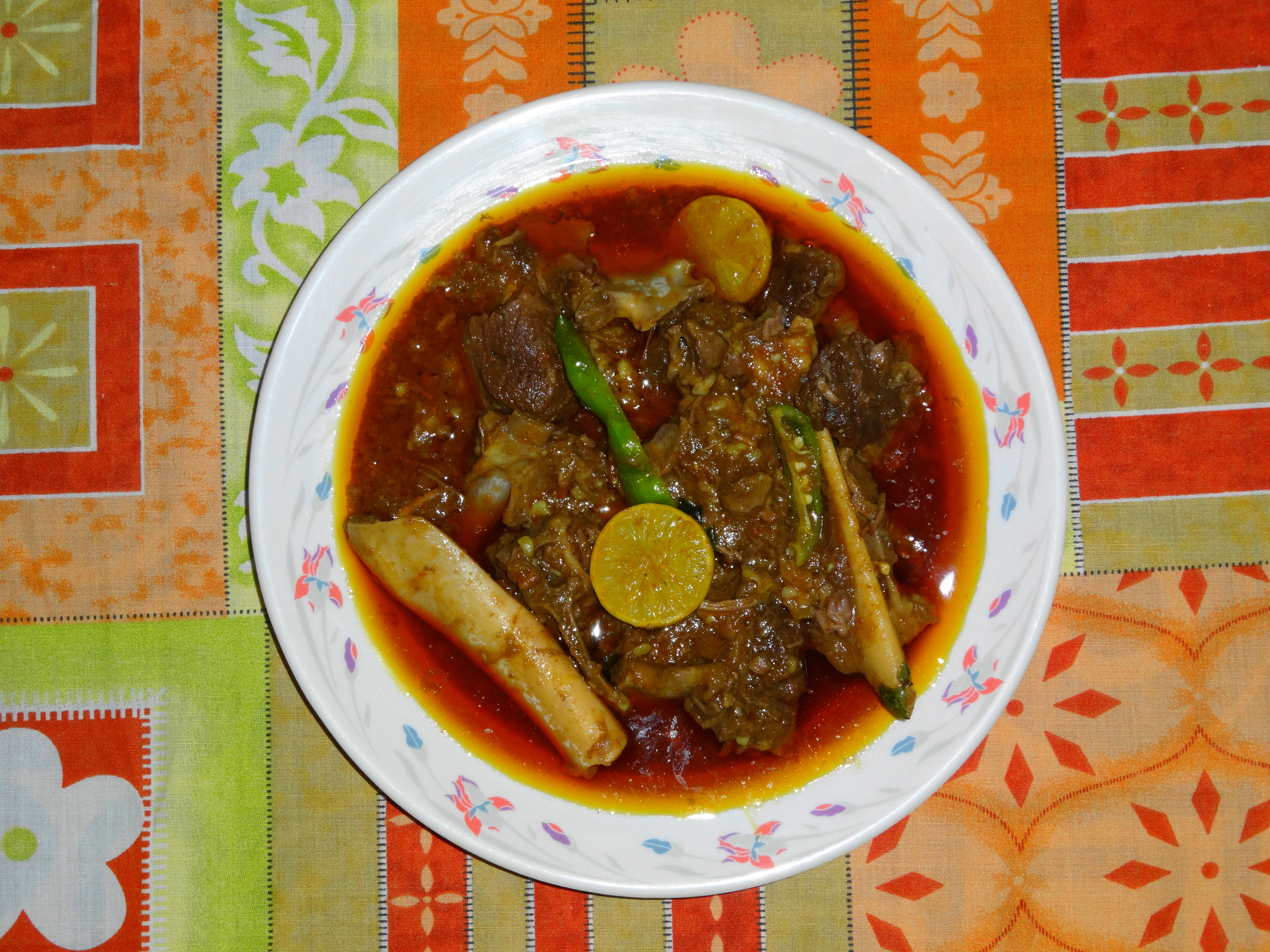
Bhugo Memon dish

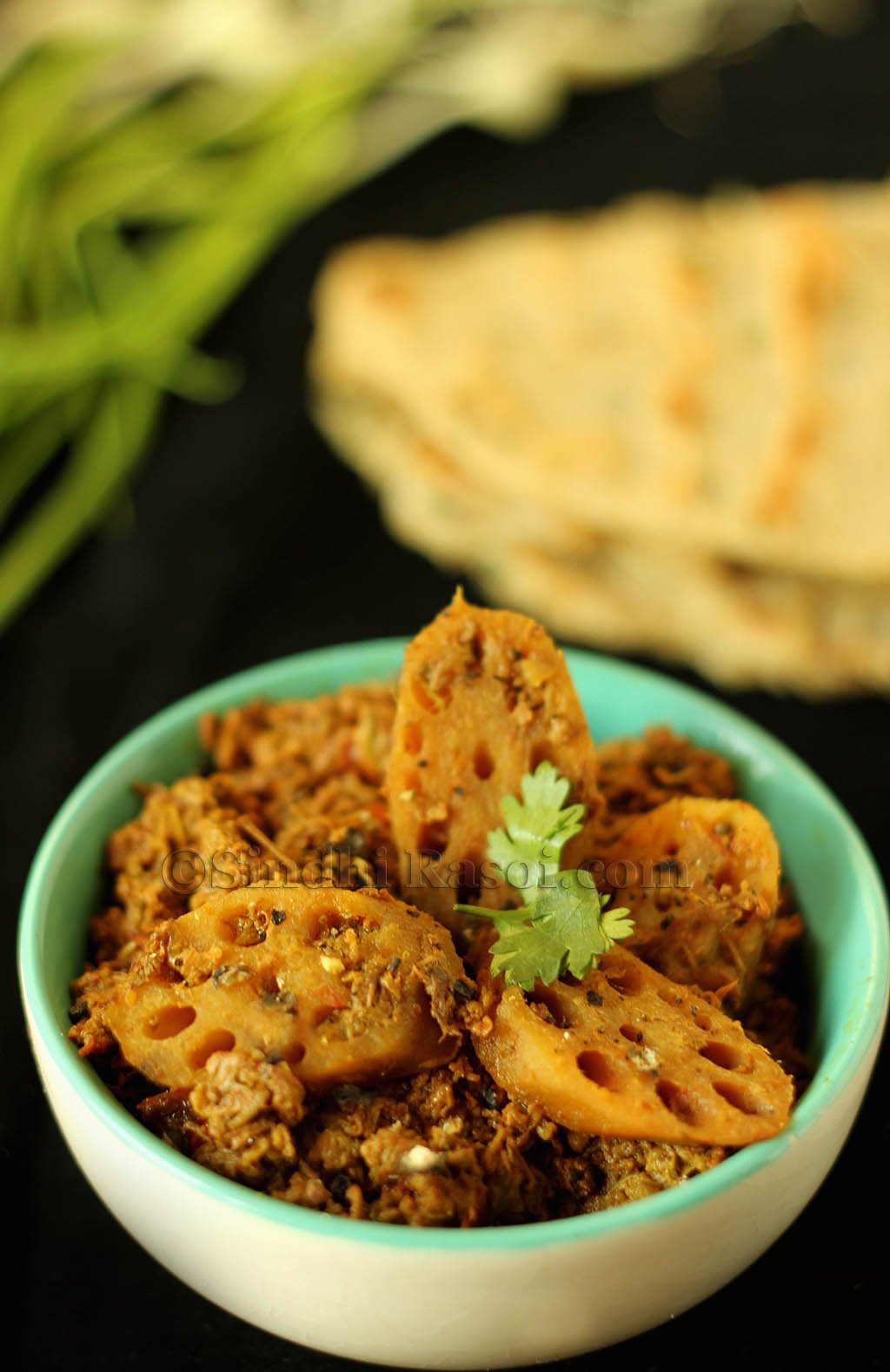
Beeh (Lotus root) snack

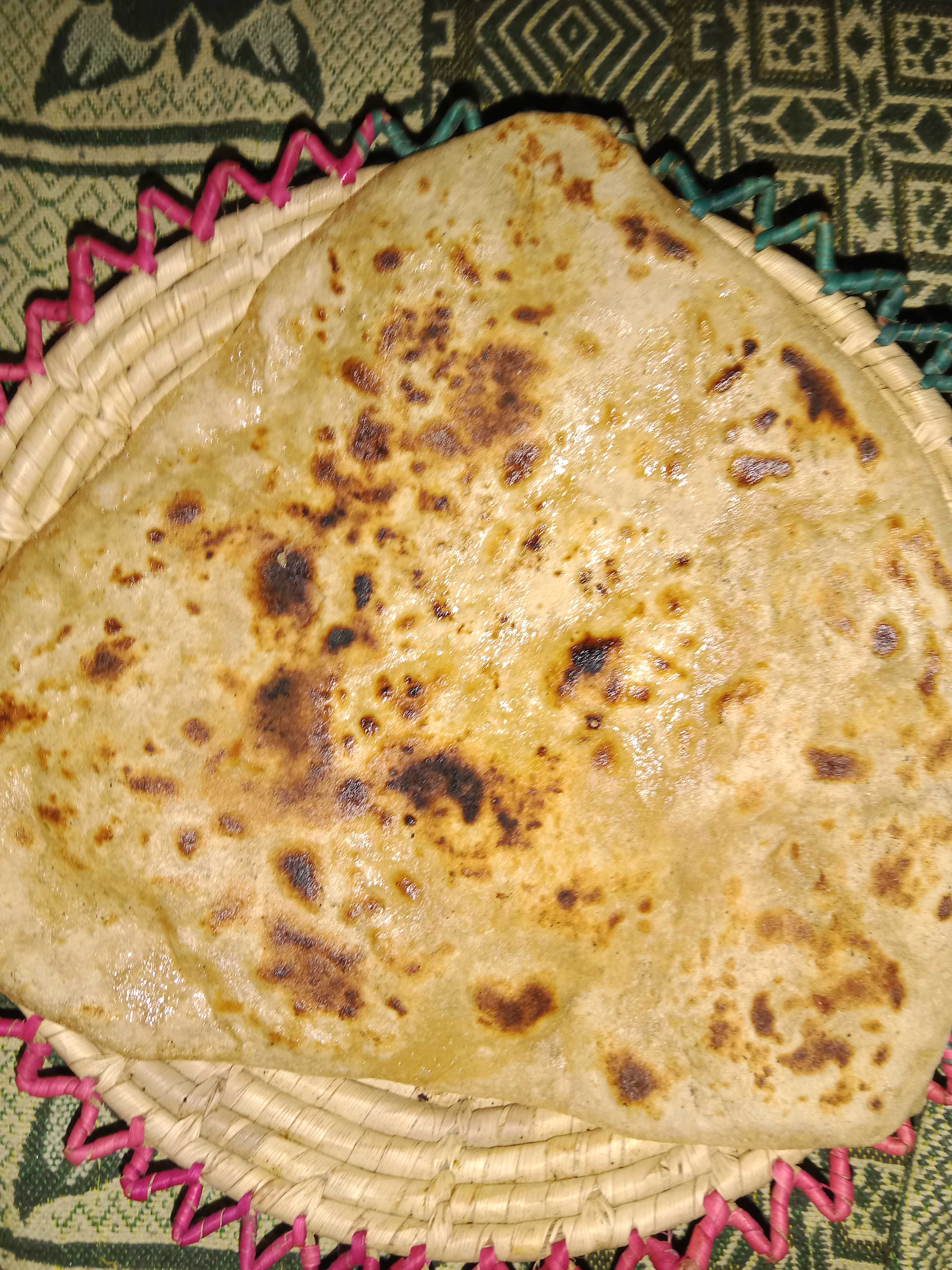
Sindhi Trikundo (triangular) Ofrato bread.

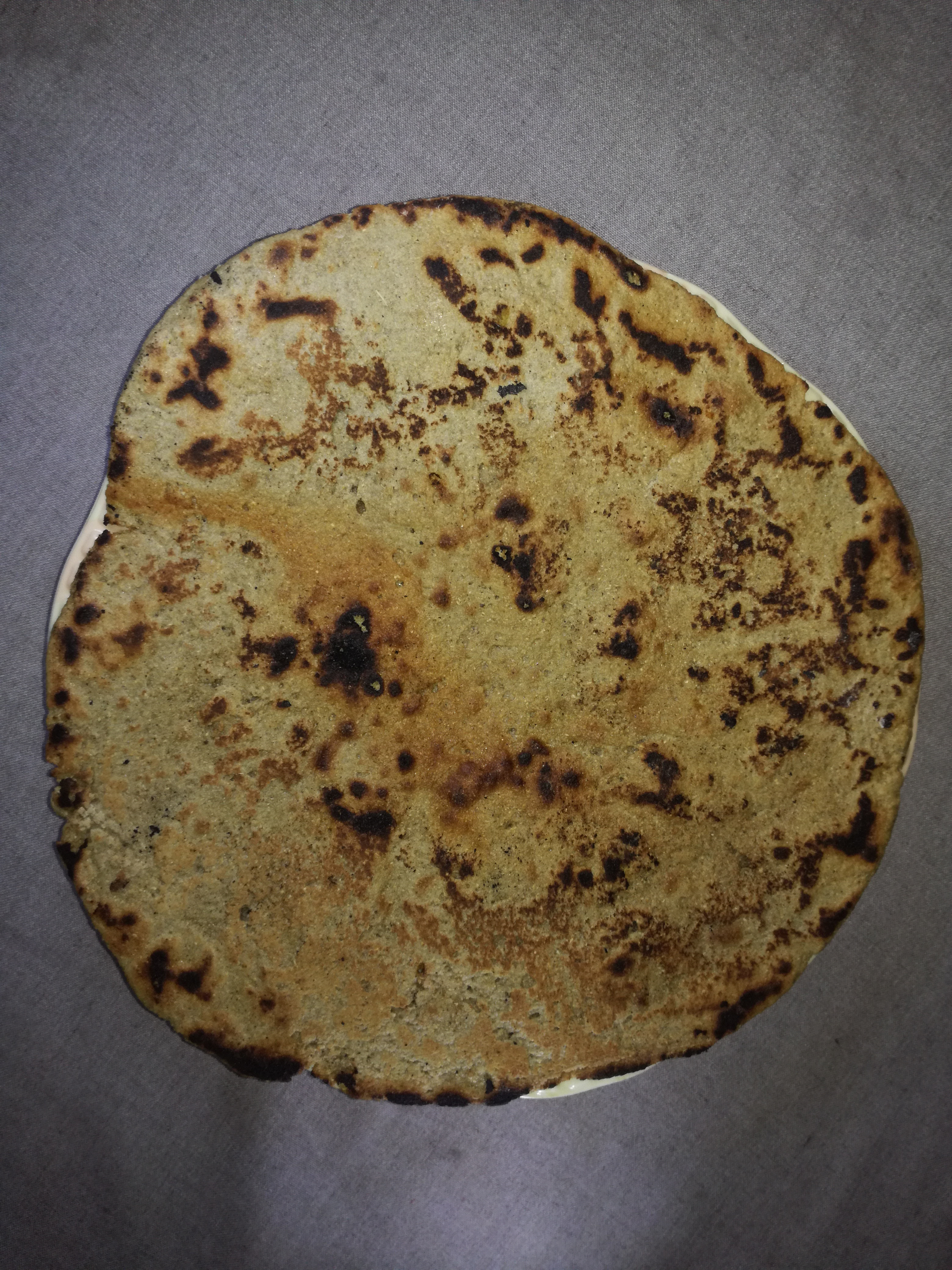
Bajhar ji maani

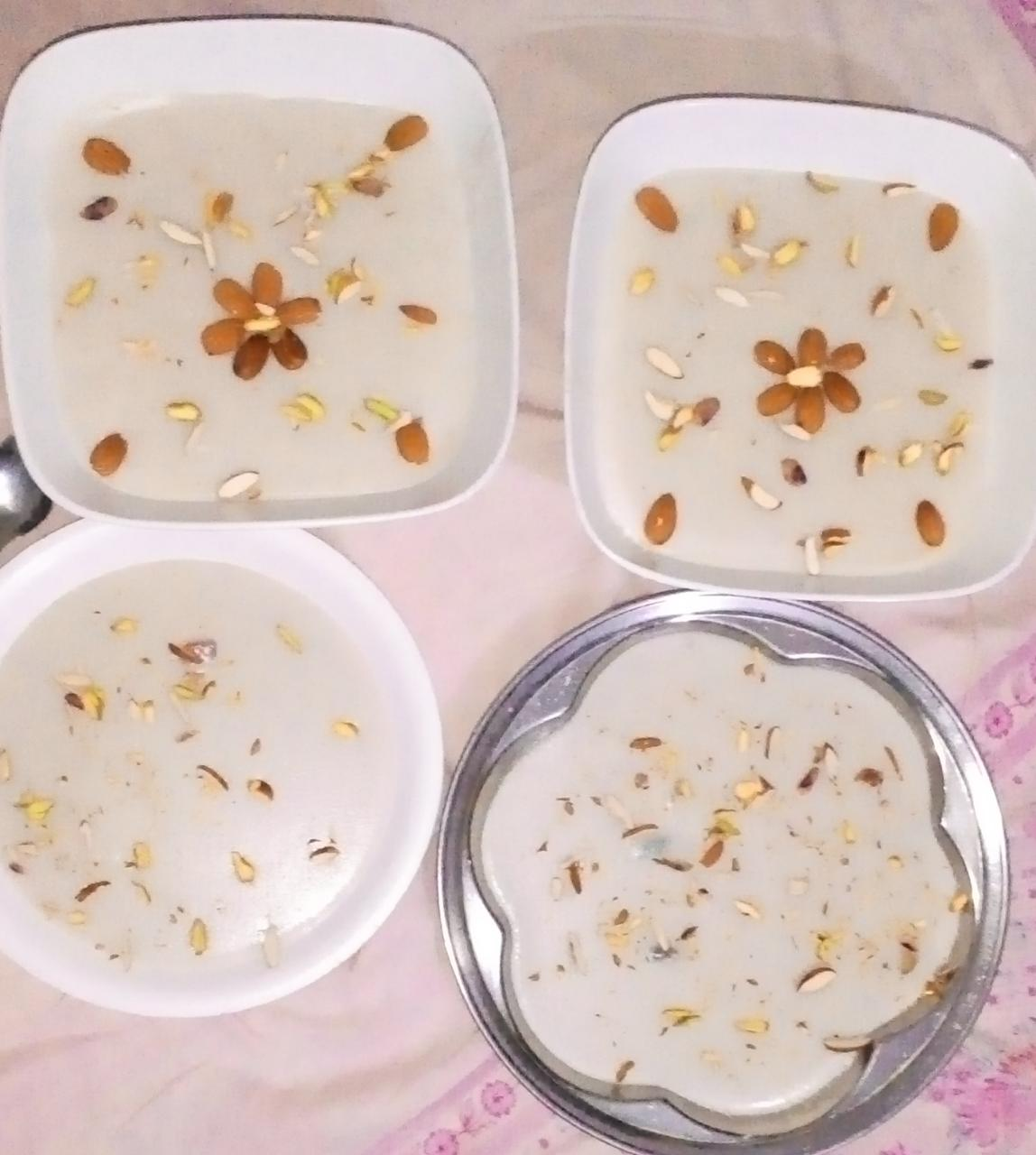
Sindhi Kheerni.

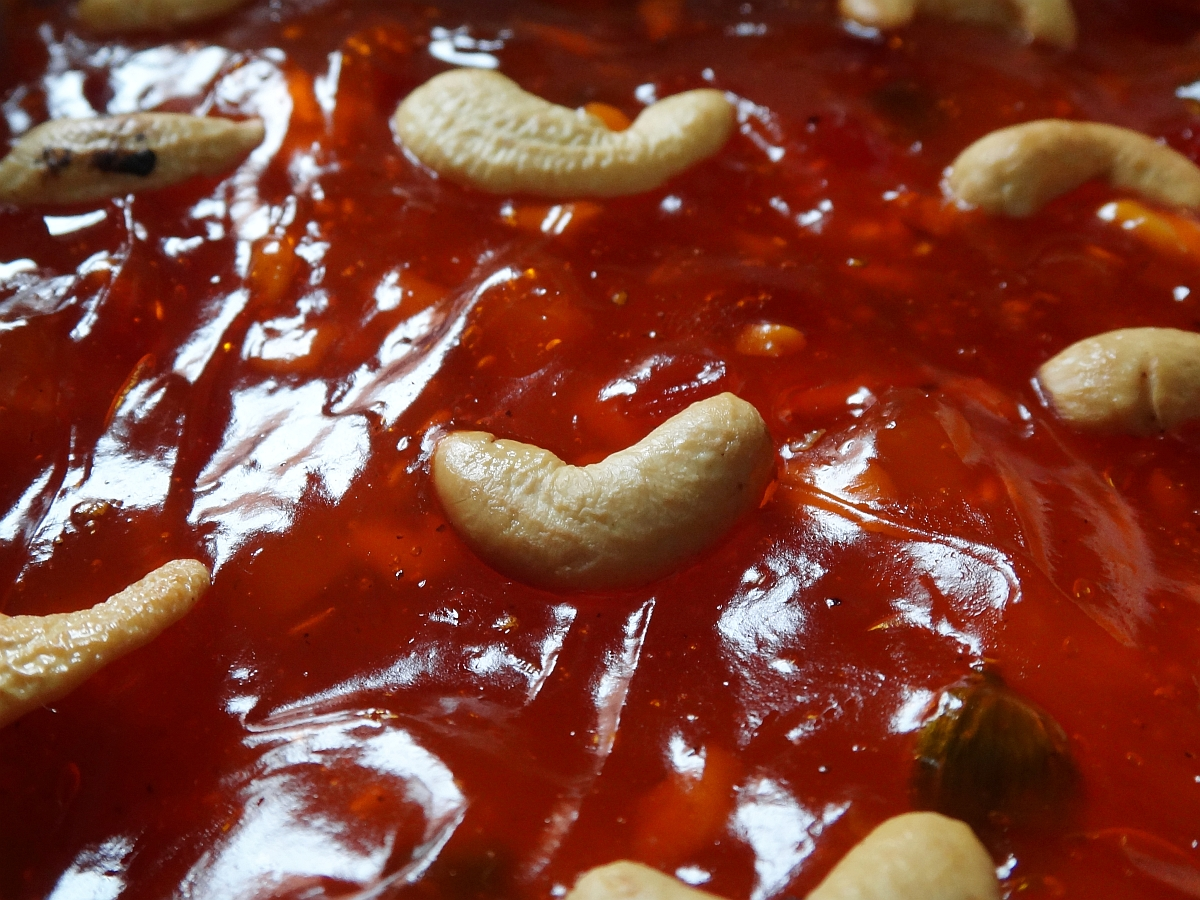
Sindhi Halwo

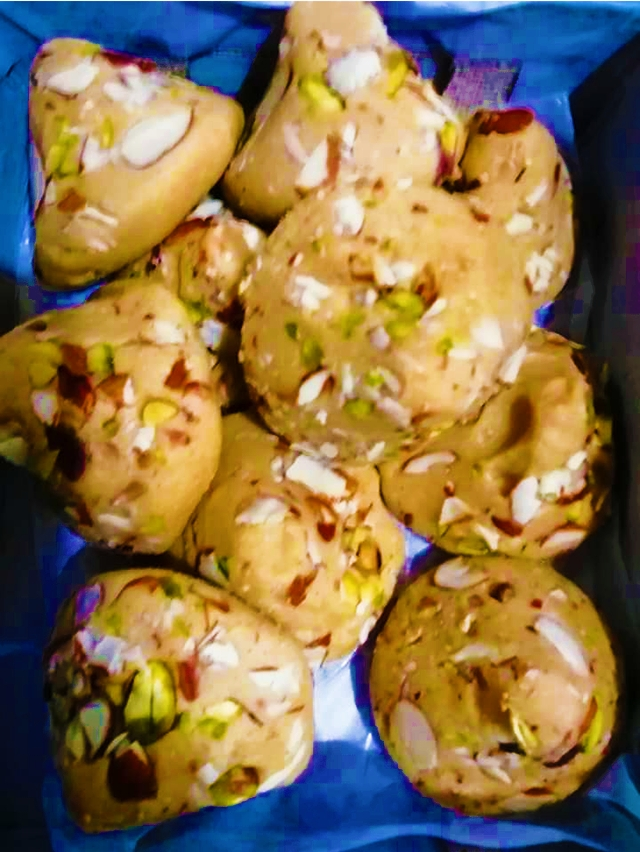
Paira of Ghotki

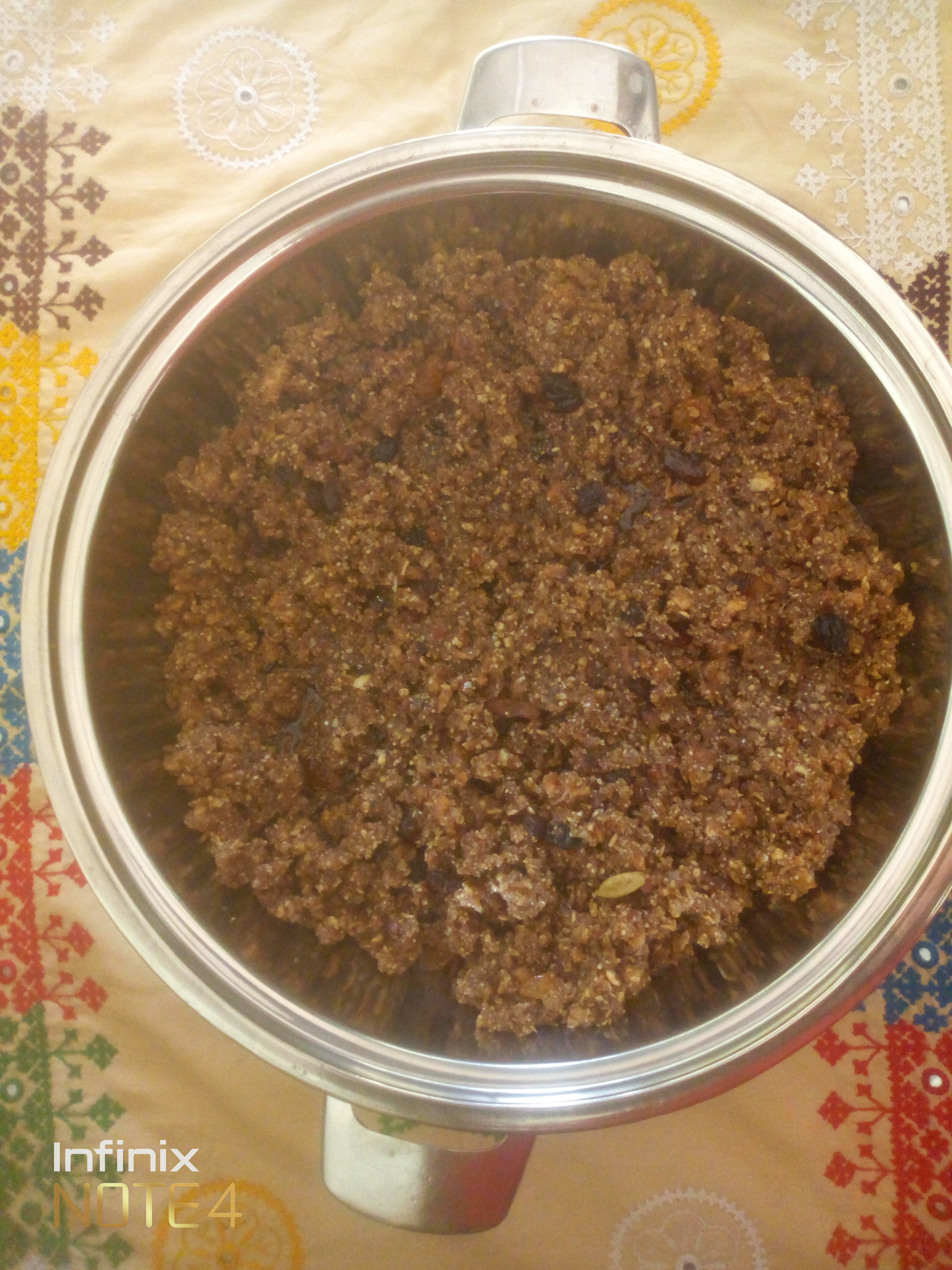
Sindhi Churi.

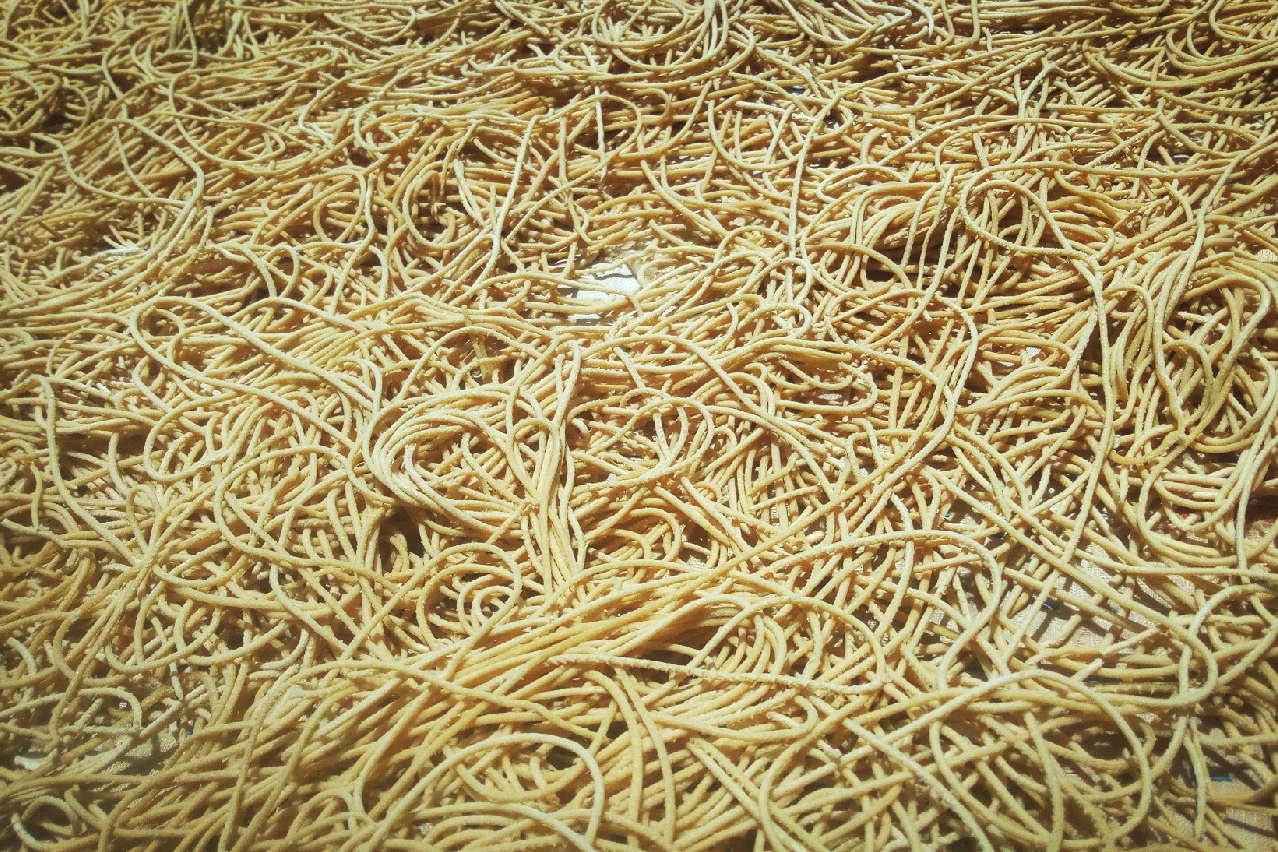
Sindhi Attay ju Saiyun (Vermicelli).

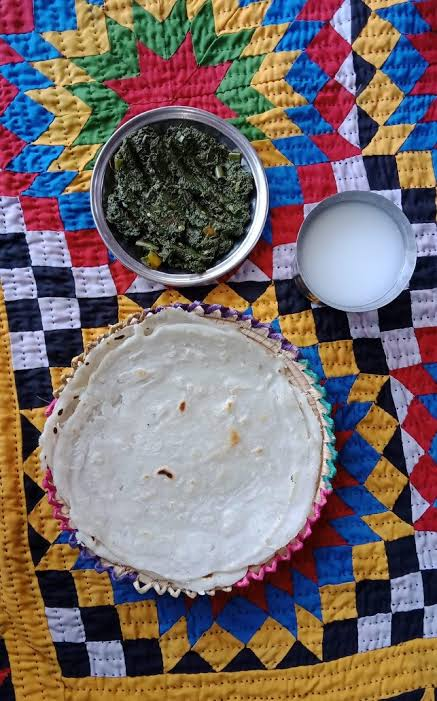
Sindhi Chawran ji Mani, Sagg and Lassi.

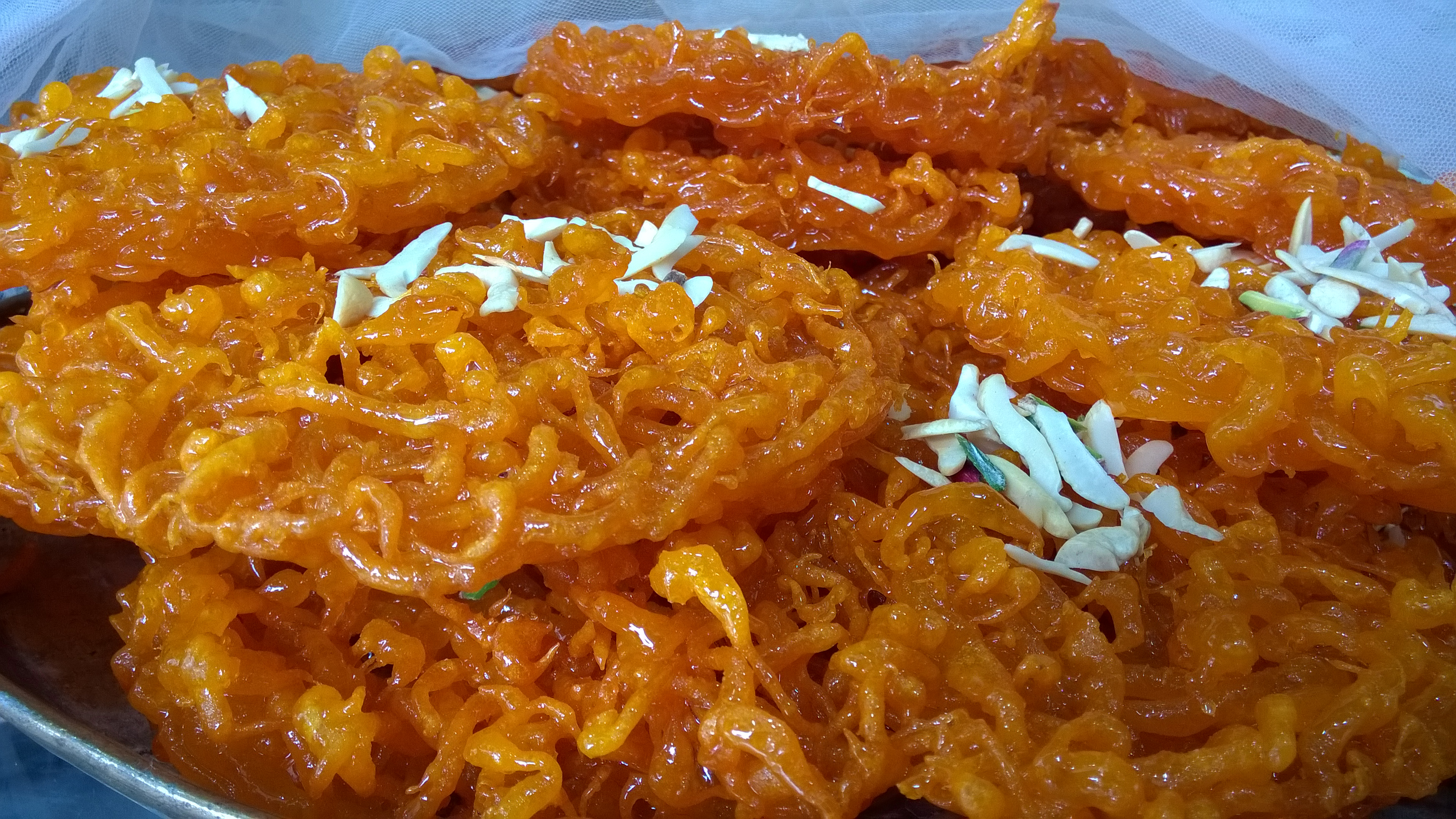
Sindhi Gheeyar.

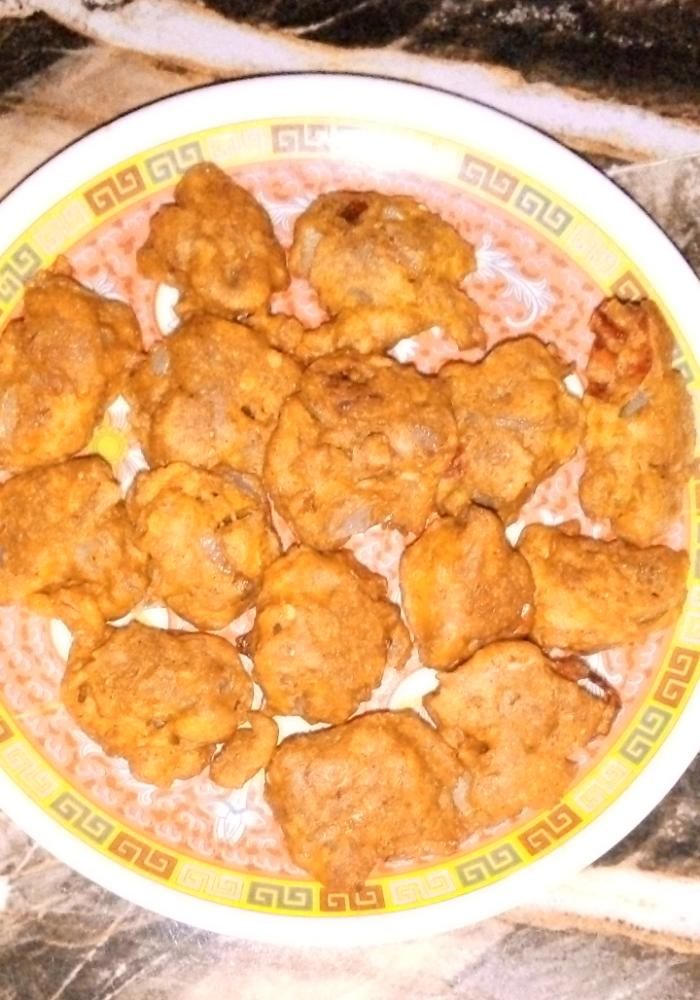
Pakora

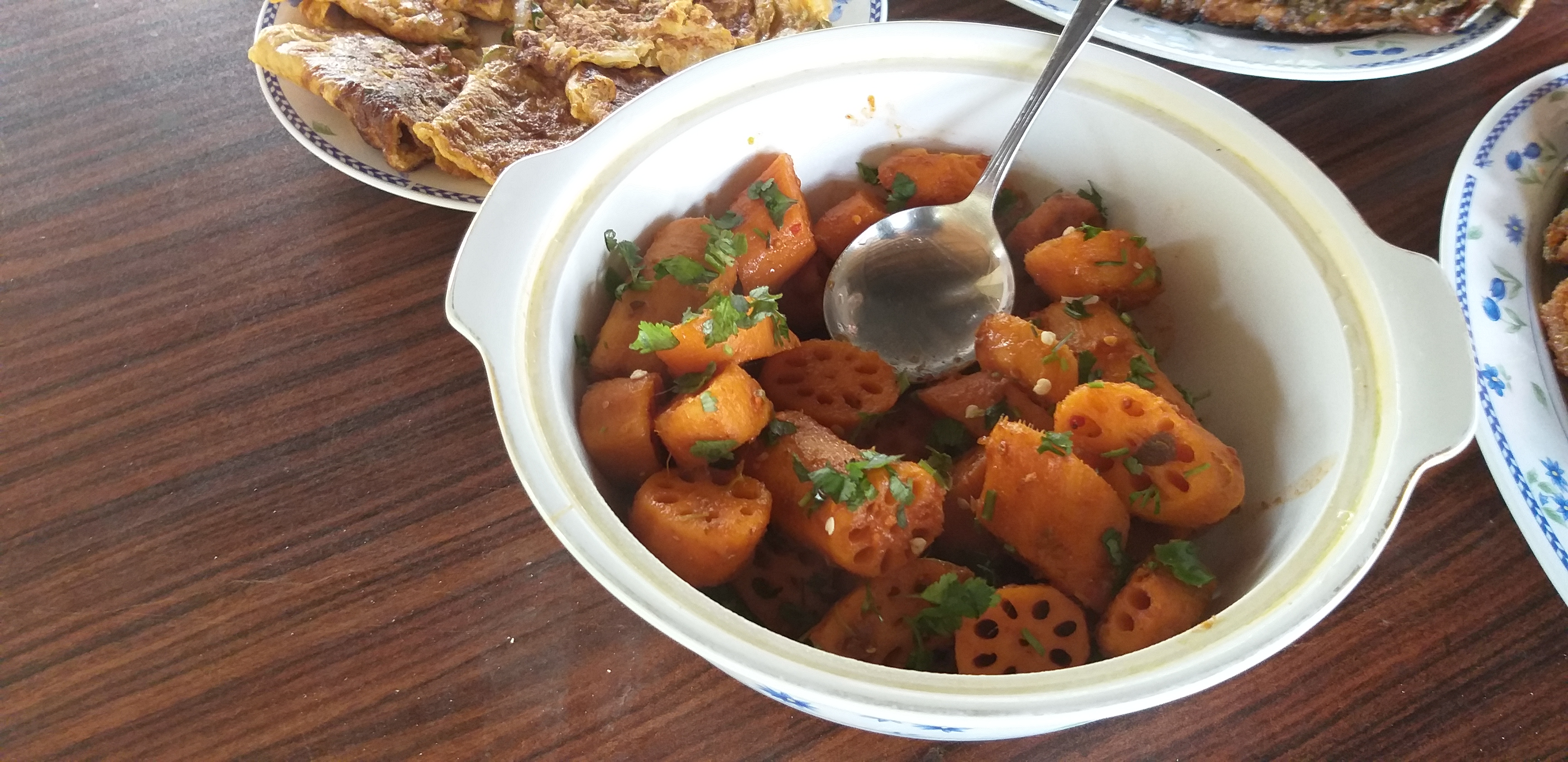
Sindhi Beeh Bhaji.

== See also ==
- Pakistani cuisine
