= Pakistani vegetable dishes =

Pakistani culinary traditions

Pakistani vegetable dishes are a part of the country's culinary traditions, focusing on vegetables as the primary ingredient.

== Vegetable dishes ==
The following is a list of popular vegetable dishes in Pakistan.

Name	Vegetable	Cooking Method	Main ingredient	Recipe
Baingan ka bhurtha	Eggplant		Eggplant, dahi (yogurt)	It is primarily a vegetarian dish that comprises bhurtha (minced vegetables) made from eggplant (baingan) which is grilled over charcoal or direct fire, to infuse the dish with a smoky flavour.
Baingan	Baingan		Baingan	Baingan, which is known as Eggplant, Aubergine, or Brinjal, is a popular vegetarian dish in Pakistan. It is often cooked with onions, tomatoes, and can include other vegetables such as potatoes. It is considered a spicy dish as it is cooked with various spices, chilies, and turmeric. Usually served with traditional flatbread (roti) or rice.
Baghara baingan	Baghara baingan		Baghara baingan	
Lauki	Lauki		Lauki	
Arbi	Arbi		Arbi	
Lauki	Lauki		Lauki	
Aloo	Aloo		Aloo	Aloo (potatoes) are a versatile vegetarian dish in Pakistan. It is cooked in many ways and can be consumed for breakfast, lunch, or dinner. It can be cooked on its own, or in a combination with other vegetables such as carrots, peas, tomatoes, capsicum, etc... Another popular method of cooking is stuffing spiced mashed potatoes into fried flatbread. This is known as an "aloo paratha".
Aloo gobi	Aloo gobi		Aloo gobi	Aloo gobi is a vegetarian dish that is a combination of chopped potatoes and cauliflower, cooked in a spicy gravy. Commonly served with traditional flatbread (roti) or rice.
Karela	Karela		Karela	It is a vegetable dish with its main ingredient being bitter gourd. Other common ingredients include tomatoes, onions, garlic, spices, etc... The bitter gourd is often soaked in salt water and strained before cooking in order to remove the bitter taste. Commonly served with traditional flatbread (roti).
Bhindi	Bhindi		Bhindi	Bhindi, known as okra or lady fingers, is a spicy Pakistani vegetable dish that is cooked with onions, tomatoes, and various spices. It is often fried in oil in order to remove the stickiness of the vegetable.
Saag	Saag		Saag	

== See also ==
- List of eggplant dishes
- List of vegetable dishes
