= Baghaar-e-baingan =

Hyderabadi cuisine

Baghaare baingan
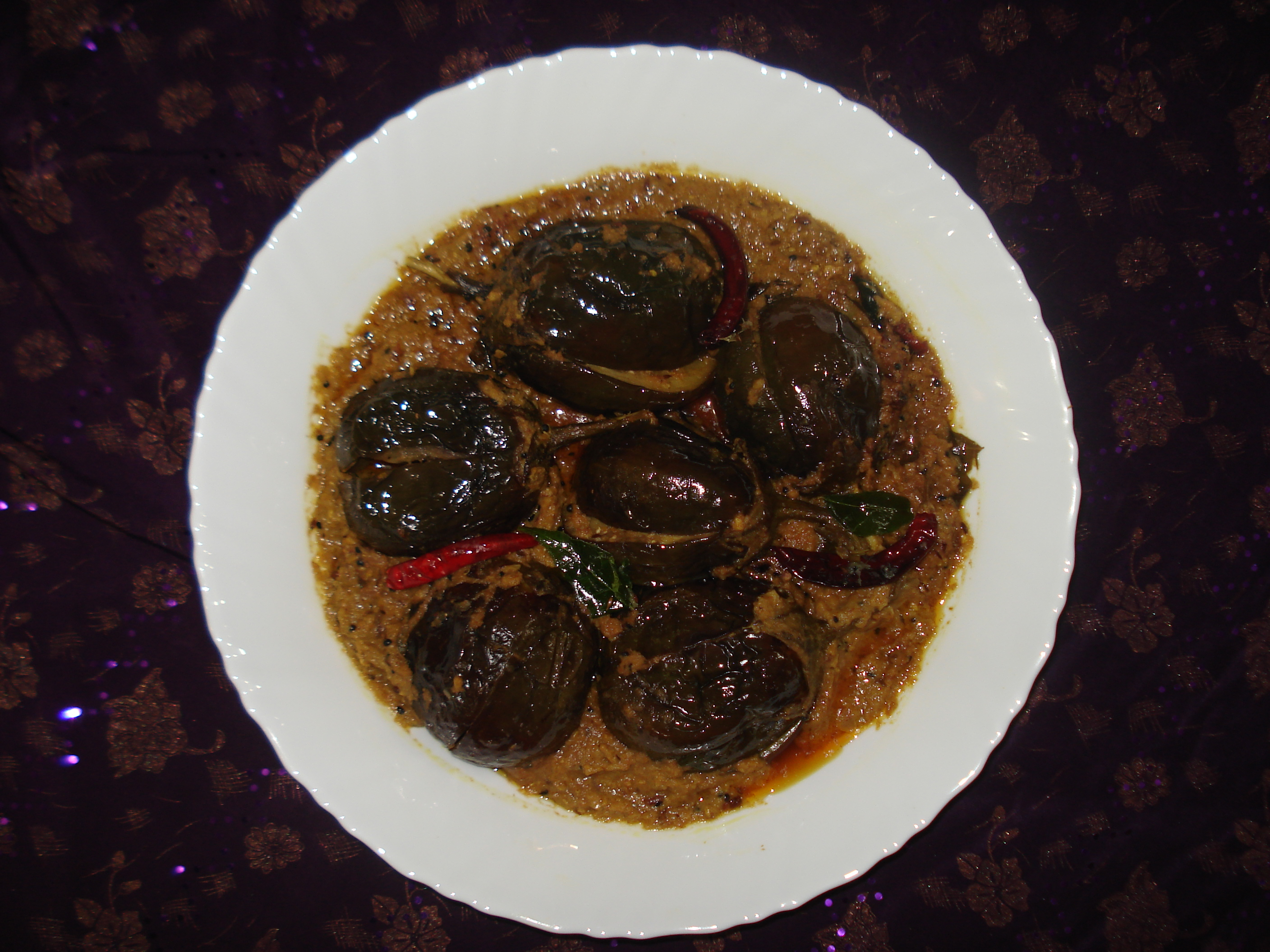
- Type: Curry
- Place of origin: India
- Region or state: Hyderabad
- Main ingredients: Eggplant, spices

Baghaar-e-baingan, also spelled Baghare baingan, Bhagaray Baigan and Bagara baingan, is an eggplant (brinjal) curry from Hyderabadi cuisine, originating in Hyderabad, India. It is commonly served as a side dish with Hyderabadi biryani.

== Etymology ==
The word baghār refers to tempering, and the word baingan refers to eggplant.

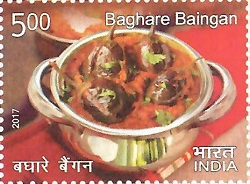
Baghare Baingan on 2017 stamp of India

== See also ==
- Baghaar
- Indian cuisine
