= Khichra =

Indian cuisine

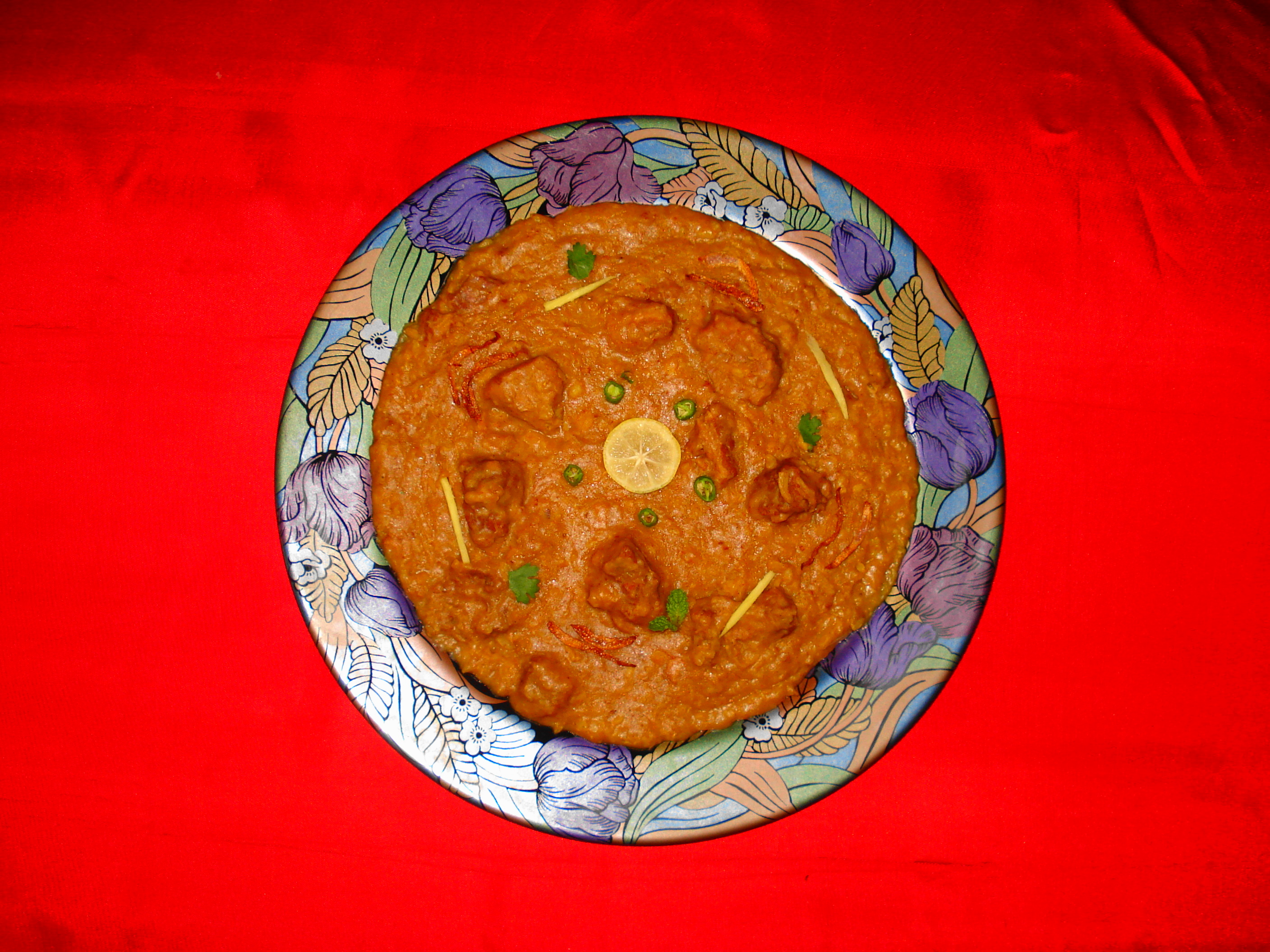
- Khichra
- Type: Stew
- Place of origin: Indian subcontinent
- Associated cuisine: India, Bangladesh, Pakistan
- Main ingredients: Meat, lentils, spices
- Variations: Beef khichra, chicken khichra, mutton khicra

Khichra or khichda (Urdu: کھچڑا) is a variation of the dish haleem, popular with Muslims of the Indian subcontinent. Khichra is cooked all year and particularly at the Ashura of Muharram. It is made using goat meat, beef, lentils and spices, slowly cooked to a thick paste. It is the meat-based variant of khichdi, a rice dish from the Indian subcontinent. In Pakistan, beef haleem and khichra are sold as street food in most cities throughout the year.

== Origin ==
Khichra and haleem are very similar dishes; ground meat is used in haleem while it is left as chunks in khichra.

The origin of haleem lies in the popular Arabian dish harees. According to Shoaib Daniyal, writing in The Sunday Guardian, the first written recipe of harees dates to the 10th century, when Arab scribe Abu Muhammad al-Muzaffar ibn Sayyar compiled a cookbook of dishes popular with the "kings and caliphs and lords and leaders" of Baghdad. "The version described in his Kitab Al-Tabikh (Book of Recipes), the world’s oldest surviving Arabic cookbook, is strikingly similar to the one people in the Middle East eat to this day", Daniyal reported. Harees was introduced to the city by Arab soldiers of the Nizam's army.

Delhi-based historian Sohail Hashmi says khichra originated as a famine-relief measure in the North Indian city of Lucknow while building the Old Imambara of Lucknow. Due to a famine, the then-Nawab of Awadh commenced the construction of an Imambargah, announcing that anyone who participated in the construction would be given free food. This free food consisted of rice slowly cooked with mutton and various pulses, thus becoming rich in protein and carbohydrates. This helped a number of famine-affected people who would otherwise have died. Once the construction of the Imambargah was completed, the dish remained popular and can today be found not just in Lucknow, but a number of cities of the Indian subcontinent. Travellers took this dish to other parts of the Indian subcontinent, where it acquired local variations.

== Haleem, khichra and khichdi ==
In the Indian subcontinent, haleem and khichra are made with the same ingredients. Haleem is cooked until the meat blends with the lentils, while in khichra, the chunks of meat remain cubes. Khichdi is a vegetarian dish with rice and pulses or lentils.

== See also ==
- List of Pakistani soups and stews
- List of stews
- Ashure
