= Khichdi =

South Asian rice and lentil dish

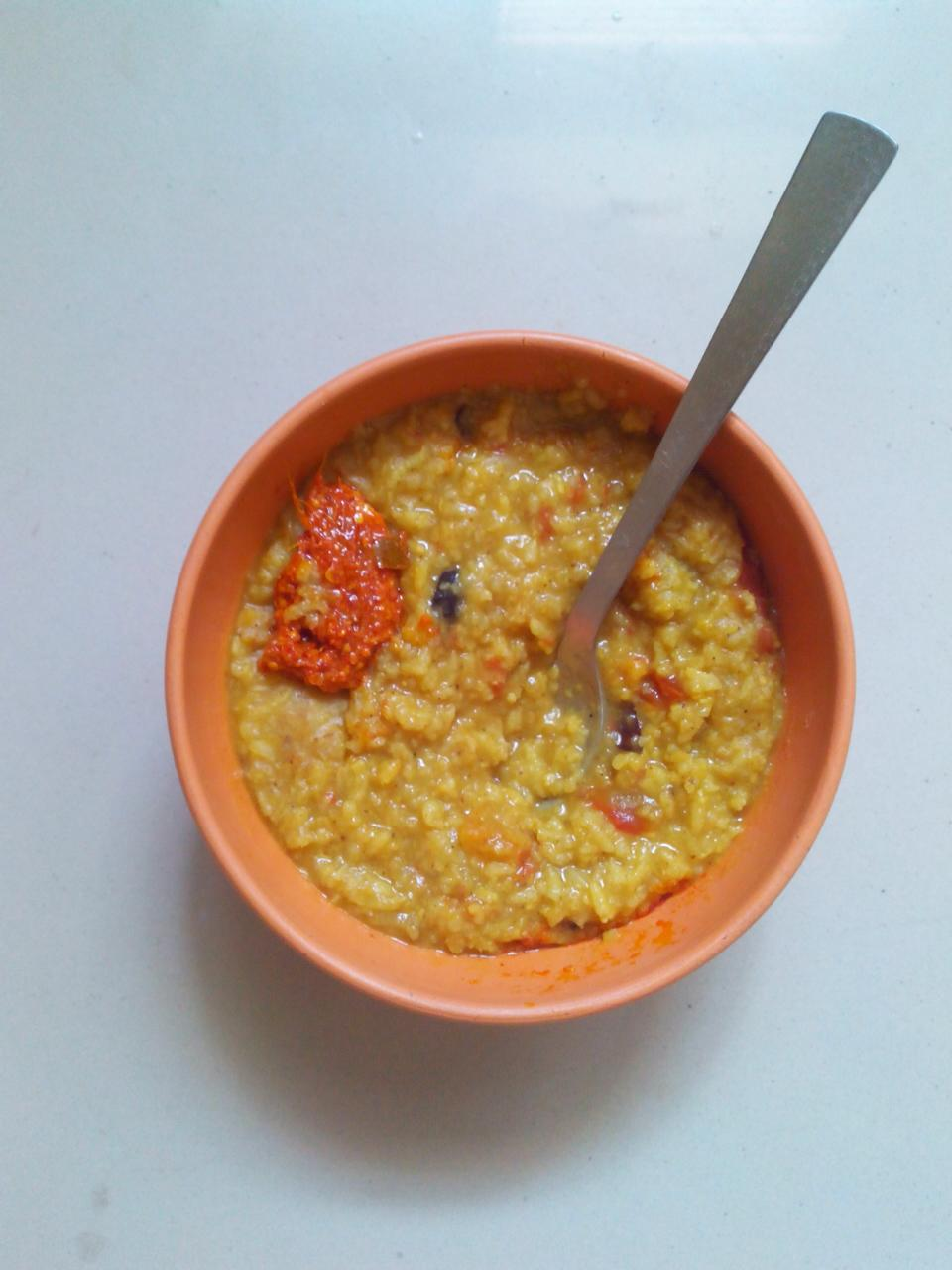
- A bowl of dal khichri served with achar
- Alternative names: Khichdi, khichadi, khichdee, khichadi, khichuri (Bengali), khisiri (Assamese), khechidi/khechudi (Odia), kisuri (Sylheti), khichari, kitcheree, kitchree
- Type: Rice
- Place of origin: India
- Region or state: Indian subcontinent
- Associated cuisine: India, Bangladesh, Pakistan, Nepal, Trinidad and Tobago, Guyana, Suriname, Fiji, Mauritius
- Main ingredients: Rice, lentils and spices
- Ingredients generally used: Cauliflower, potatoes, green peas and other vegetables
- Variations: Mung dal khichri, bajra-ri-khichri (Rajasthani millet khichri), sadi khichri (lentil and rice khichri)

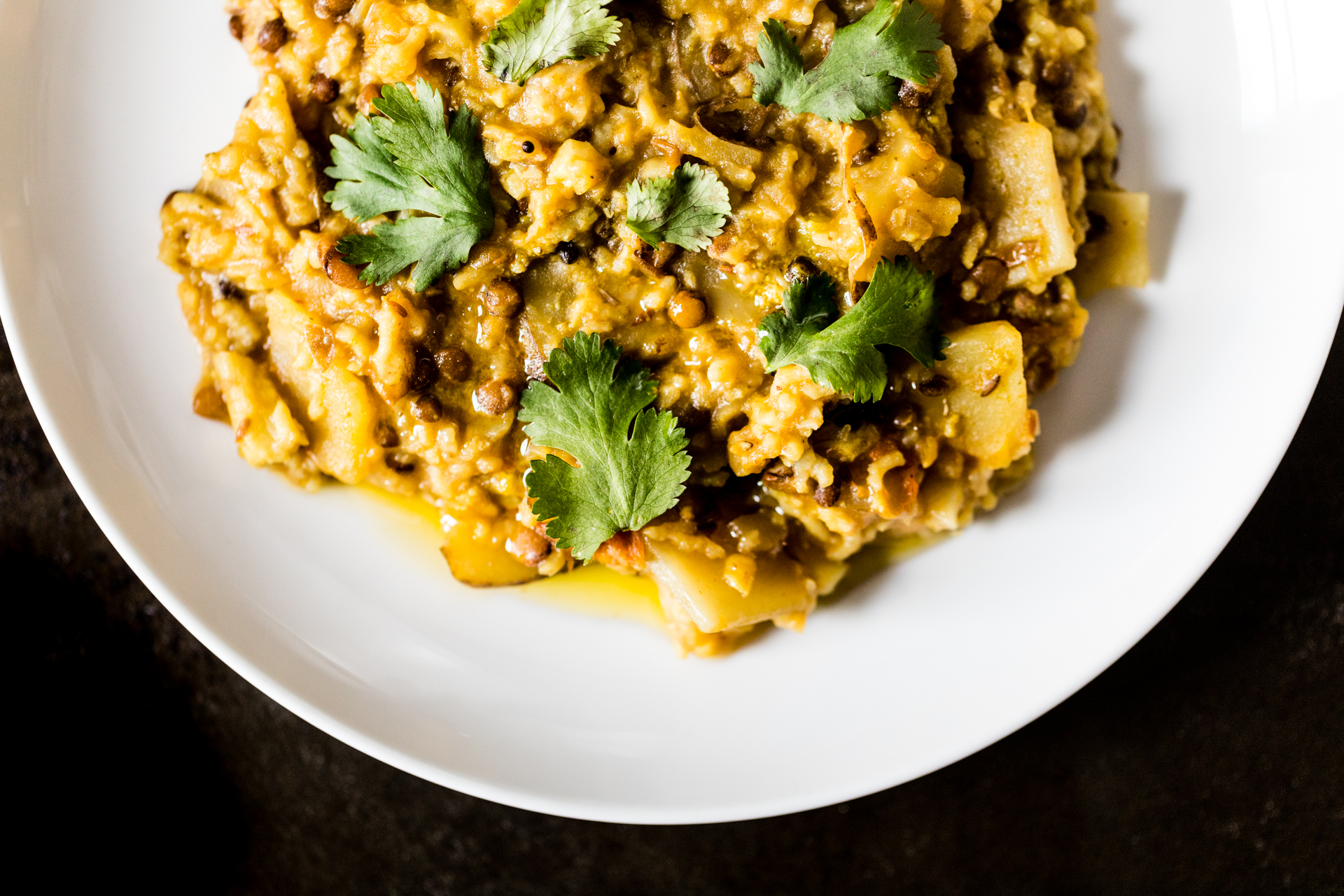
Homemade khichadi

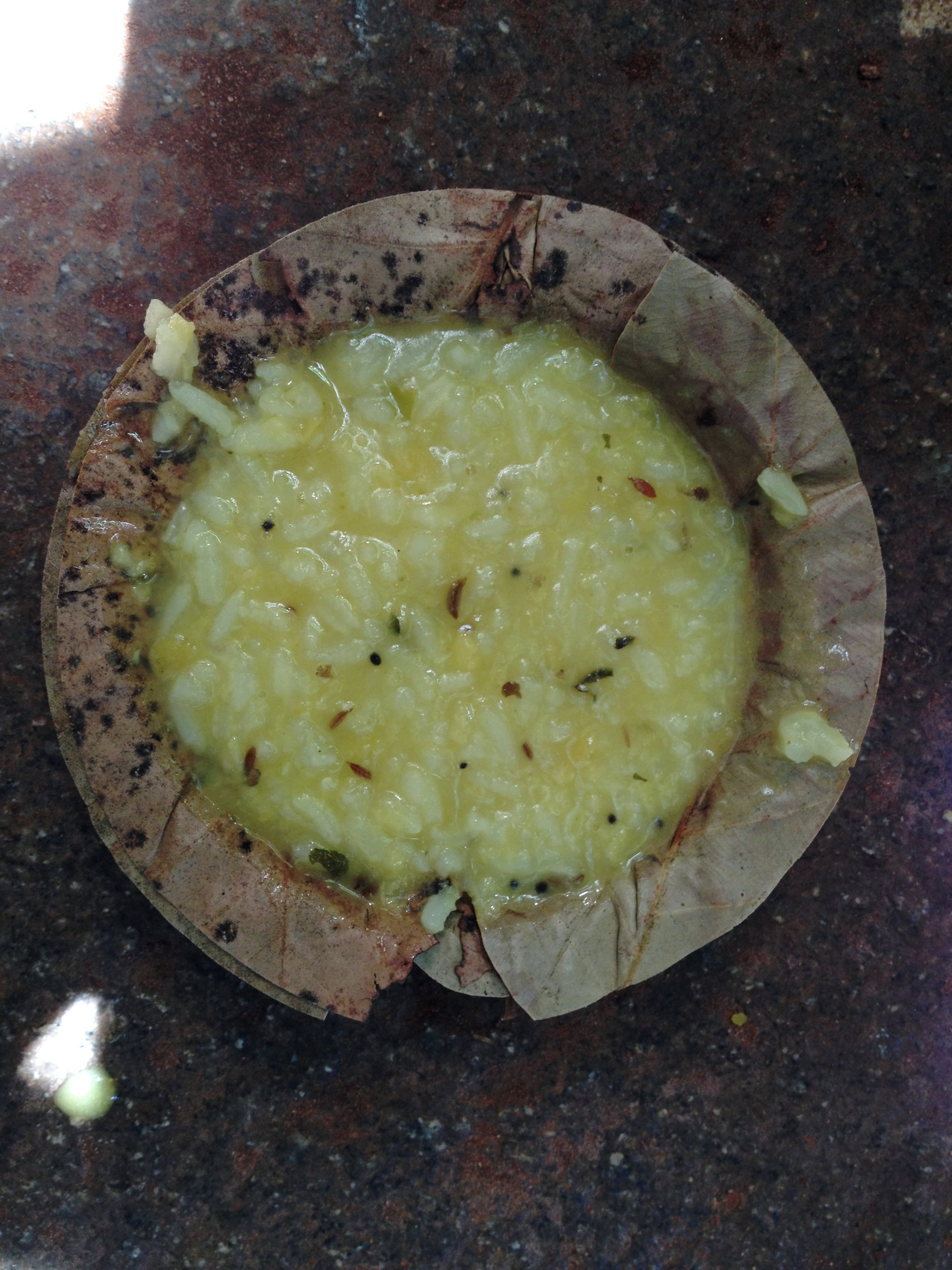
Khichri prasāda served in areca-leaf traditional bowl, Bengaluru

Khichdi or khichri (Urdu: کھچڑی, romanised: khicṛī, Hindi: खिचड़ी, romanised: khicṛī, pronounced [ˈkʰɪtʃɽiː], Bengali: খিচুড়ি, romanised: Khicuṛi, Odia: ଖେଚୁଡି, Bhojpuri: 𑂎𑂲𑂡𑂩𑂲, romanised: Khēcharē) is a dish in South Asian cuisine made of rice and lentils (dal) with numerous variations. Variations include bajra and mung dal khichri. In Indian culture, in several regions, especially in the northern areas, it is one of the first solid foods that babies eat.

== Etymology and spelling ==
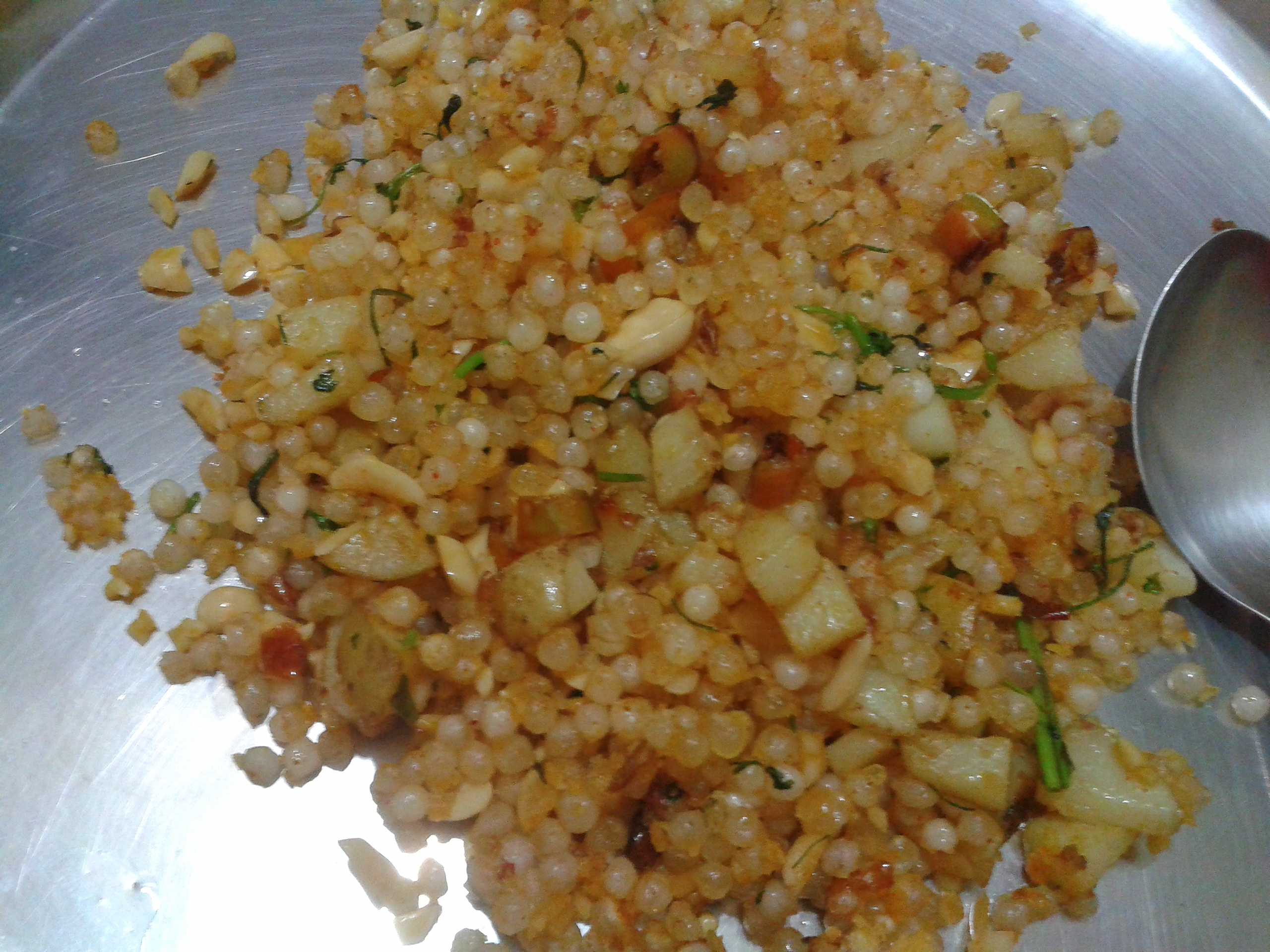
Sabudana khichri is a popular food during Shivratri or Navratri fasts.

The word Khichdī is derived from Sanskrit खिच्चा khiccā, a dish of rice and legumes.

Some divergence of transliteration may be noted in the third consonant in the word khicṛī. The sound is the retroflex flap [ɽ], which is written in Hindi with the Devanagari letter ⟨ड़⟩, and in Urdu script with the Perso-Arabic letter ⟨ڑ⟩. In Hindustani phonology, the etymological origin of the retroflex flap was /ɖ/ when it occurred between vowels. Hence in Devanagari the letter ⟨ड⟩, representing /ɖ/, was adapted to write /ɽ/ by adding a diacritic under it. In Urdu script, the phonological quality of the flap was represented by adapting the letter ⟨ر⟩, representing /r/, with a diacritic added above it to indicate the retroflex quality. The occurrence of this consonant in the word khicṛī has given rise to two alternative spellings in English: khichri, which reflects its phonology, and khichdi, which reflects its etymology.

== History ==
Historical accounts of Khichdi extend across several periods of Indian history. The Greek king Seleucus during his campaign in India (305-303 BC), mentioned that rice with pulses is very popular among people of the Indian subcontinent. Strabo also notes that Indian food mainly consisted of rice porridge and a beverage made of rice, presently called arak. The Moroccan traveler Ibn Battuta mentions khichdi as a dish in India composed of rice and mung beans, during his stay around 1350. khichdi is described in the writings of Afanasiy Nikitin, a Russian adventurer who travelled to the Indian subcontinent in the 15th century. It was very popular with the Mughals, especially Jahangir. Ain-i-Akbari, a 16th-century document written by Mughal Emperor Akbar's vizier, Abu'l Fadl, mentions the recipe for khichdi, which gives seven variations. There is an anecdotal story about khichdi featuring Akbar and his court advisor, Birbal.

The Anglo-Indian dish kedgeree is thought to derive from khichri.

== Regional variations ==
Khichdi is a very popular dish across the Indian subcontinent which consists of, Bangladesh, Pakistan, Nepal and Sri Lanka. The dish is also widely prepared in many Indian states, such as Punjab, Haryana, Rajasthan, Karnataka, Telangana, Madhya Pradesh, Gujarat, Tamil Nadu, Andhra Pradesh, West Bengal, Assam, Bihar, Jharkhand, Uttar Pradesh, Odisha, and Maharashtra. Vegetables such as cauliflower, potato, and green peas are commonly added.

Hindus, mainly from north/northwest, who avoid eating grains during fasting, eat Sabudana khichri made from sago. In the southern part of India, however, the word khichri is not that popular. While people of Tamil Nadu and Andhra regions cook Pongal, and Kannadigas prepare Huggi which is mung dal khichdi and Bisi bele bhath, a pigeon pea variation with vegetables, Keralites have no similar dish.

In the Bhojpuri region, Khēcharē is consumed especially on saturday as a tradition. Each household cook Khēcharē and offer it to Sanee Devta and then take it as parsadee.

Khichdi was the inspiration for Anglo-Indian kedgeree Khichdi is a popular traditional staple in Haryana, specially in the rural areas. Haryanvi khichdi is made from pearl millet and mung dal (split mung bean) pounded in mortar (unkhal), and often eaten by mixing with warm ghee or lassi, or even yogurt. Sometimes, jowar is also mixed with bajra and mung dal.

The Hyderabadi Muslim community, of the erstwhile Hyderabad State, in present-day Telangana, Marathwada, and Kalyana-Karnataka regions, make khichdi as a common breakfast dish, and is an important part of Hyderabadi cuisine. The dish is called khichri, kheema, khatta, or other switch-around versions of the previous, named after the three parts of the meal, Khichri, ground beef, and a sour sauce, made of tamarind and sesame.

Khichra is similar to haleem, a meat dish, while khichra is a vegetarian dish with rice and pulses or lentils, with no spices.

== National dish controversy ==
In 2017, Indian media unofficially designated it as the "national dish", as it is being globally promoted by the government of India as "queen of all foods". The report that the government may designate khichri as India's "national dish" brought significant ridicule from the opposition politicians.

However, India's Minister of Food Processing Industries Harsimrat Kaur Badal clarified that while khichdi is considered nutritious and healthy food in India, the government did not have any plans to designate a national food.

== In popular culture ==
Khichdi has lent its name to media synonymous with ensembles or potpourri as depicted in the popular culture through movies such as Khichdi: The Movie, and TV sitcoms such as Khichdi and Instant Khichdi.

The dish has been cooked at both MasterChef Australia and America.

== Gallery ==
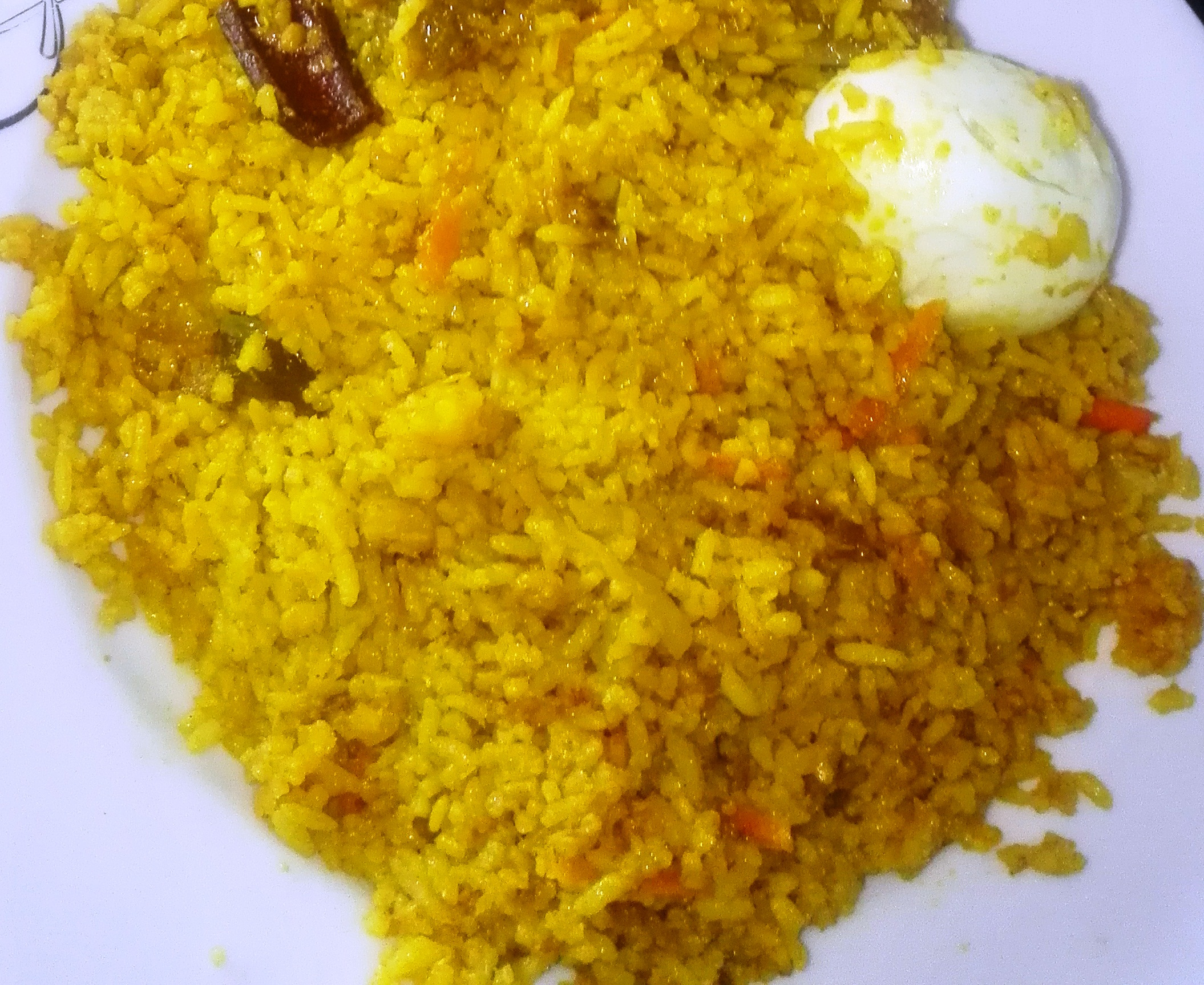
Khichuri, Bangladeshi-style

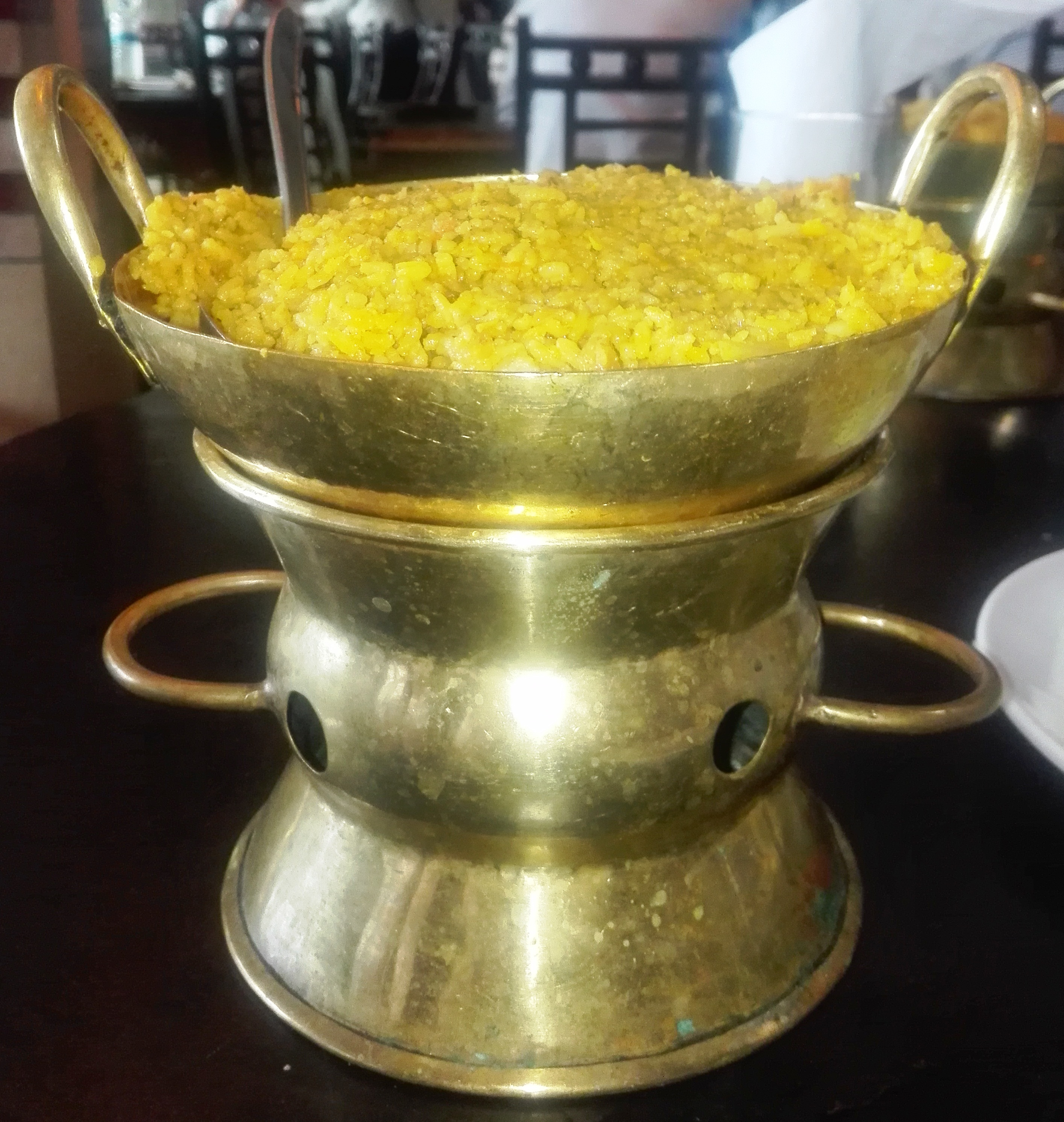
Kadhai khichri

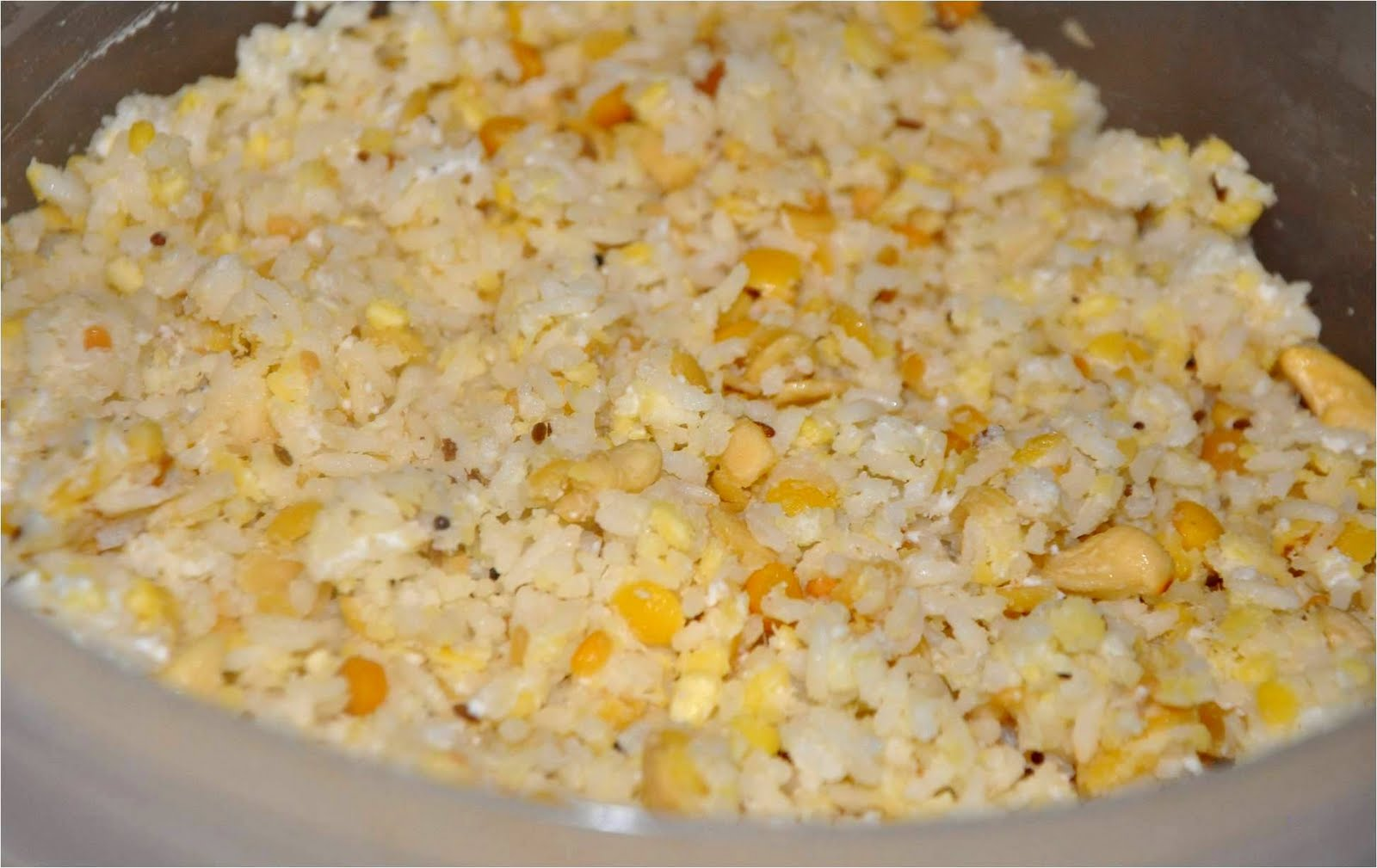
Coconut khichdi

== See also ==
- Kedgeree
