= Harissa (disambiguation) =

Harissa is a Tunisian hot red sauce or paste.

Harissa may also refer to:

- Harissa (dish), an Armenian porridge made of chicken and wheat
- Harissa, Lebanon, a mountain village

== See also ==
- Harisa or Harees, an Arabic dish of wheat, meat and salt
- Basbousa, a dessert made from semolina, sometimes referred to as "hareesa"
