= Shah Ghouse Café =

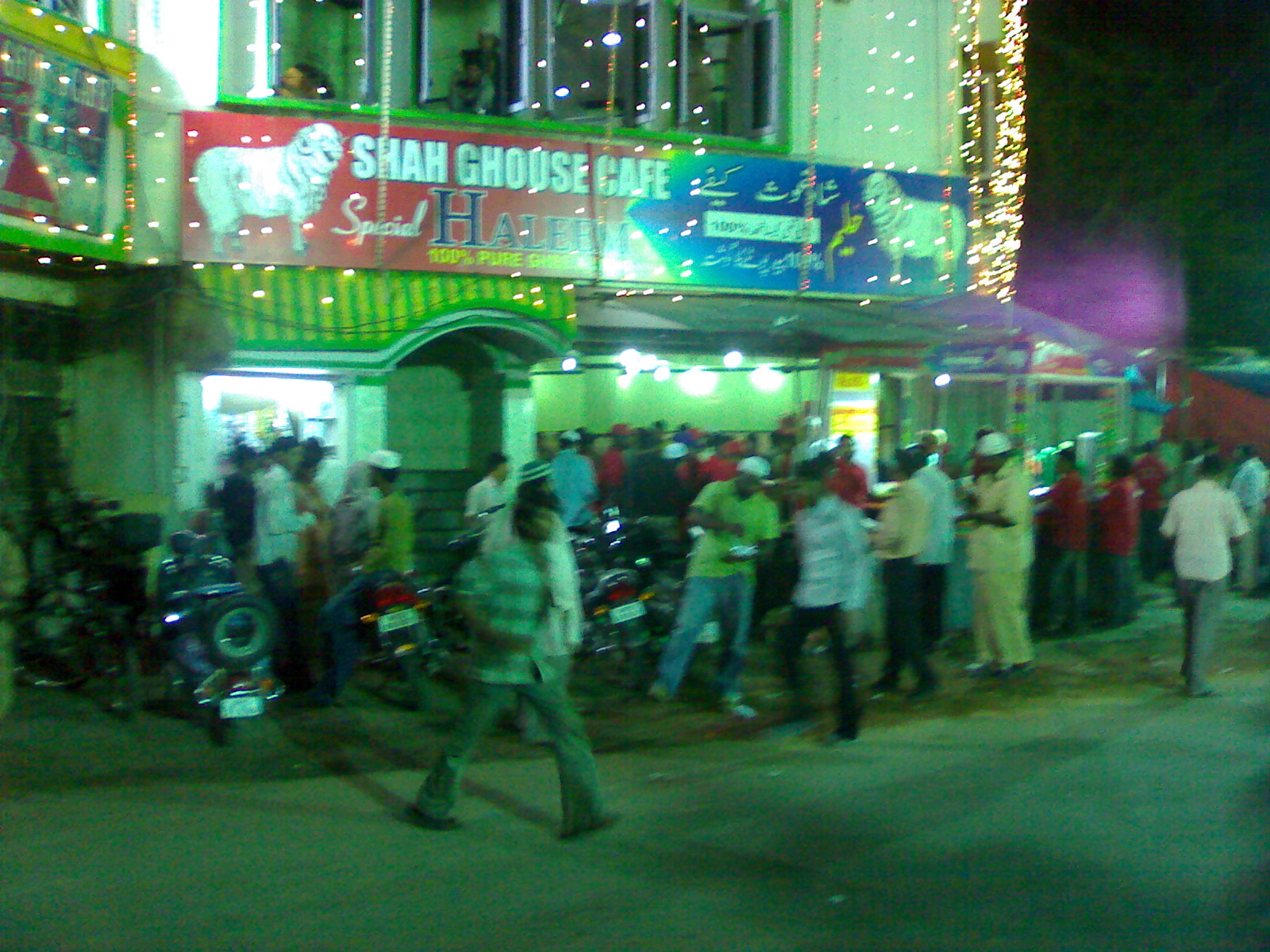
- Restaurant's exterior in 2008
- Interactive map of Shah Ghouse Café

Restaurant information
- Established: 1989
- Owners: Mohammad Rabbani, Mohammad Ghouse Pasha, Mohammed Irfan
- Food type: Hyderabadi cuisine
- Dress code: casual
- Location: Shah-Ali-Banda, Hyderabad, Telangana, 500 053, India
- Coordinates: 17°20′53″N 78°28′12″E
- Other locations: Tolichowki; Gachibowli; Lakdi ka pul; Kondapur
- Website: shahghouse.co.in

Shah Ghouse Café is a popular restaurant chain specializing in Hyderabadi cuisine, located in Hyderabad, Telangana, India. The café is widely celebrated for its biryani, Hyderabadi haleem, and other traditional dishes. With branches in Shah-Ali-Banda, Tolichowki, Gachibowli, and Kondapur, Shah Ghouse Café has become an iconic culinary destination in the city, especially during Ramadan when its Hyderabadi haleem draws large crowds.

== History ==
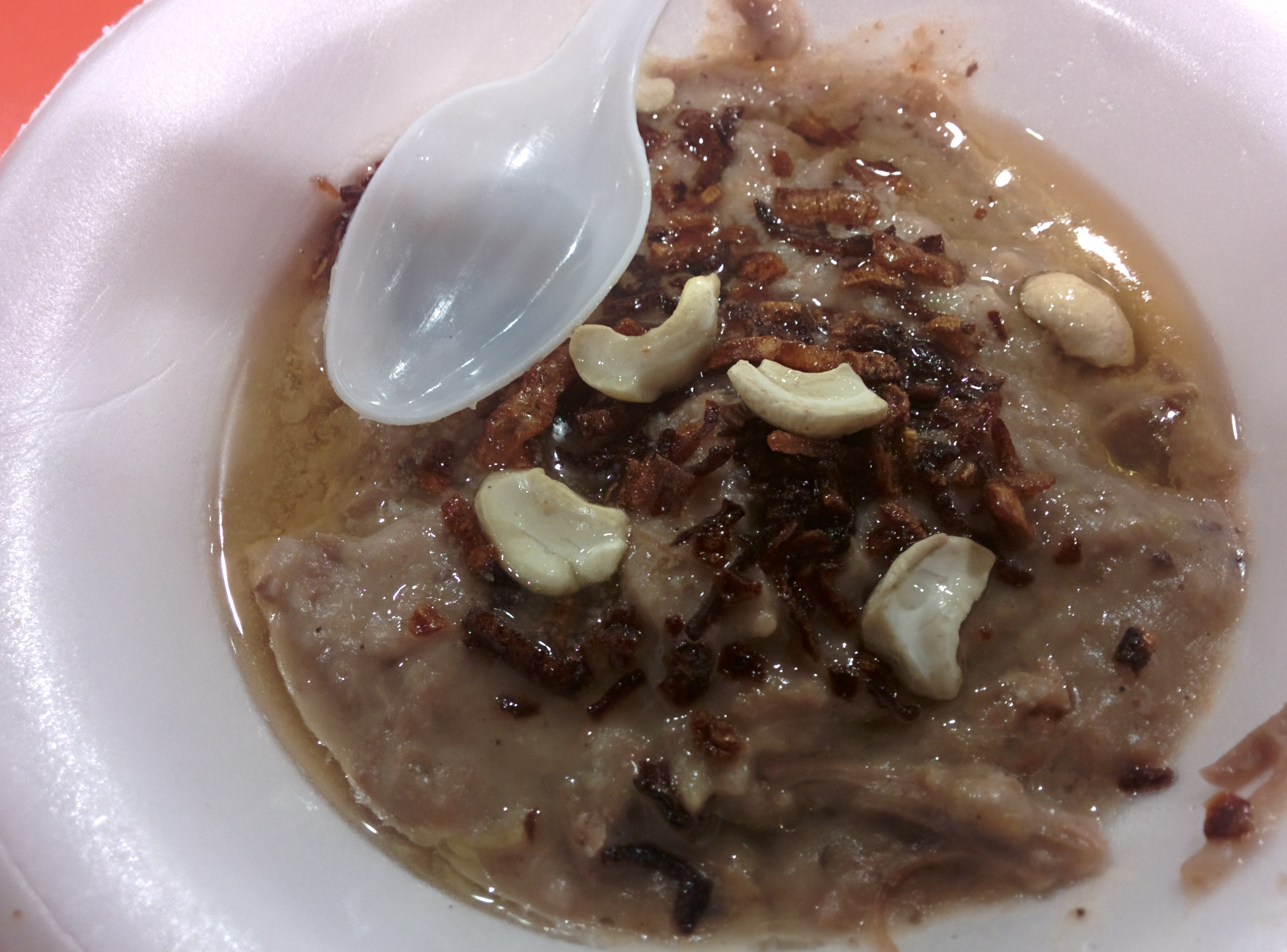
Shah Ghouse Haleem

The restaurant was founded by Mohammad Rabbani in 1989 along with Mohammad Ghouse Pasha and Mohammad Irfan. Rabbani who previously ran a family-owned mutton shop decided to open a restaurant in the Old City of Hyderabad. Shah Ghouse Café started as a modest establishment in the Old City and gradually expanded with new branches in Tolichowki, Gachibowli, and Kondapur. Over the decades, the restaurant grew from a humble eatery near the Charminar into a top gastronomic destination, celebrated for preserving Hyderabadi culinary tradition.

In 2008, the restaurant garnered public attention by organizing a food-eating competition. Fourteen teams, each team comprising two people, participated in the competition where the participants had to feed one another three boxes of Haleem within five minutes. The game included a cash prize of Rs. 3000 and was attended by celebrity guests, Adnan Sajid and Aziz Naser.

== Cuisine ==
Shah Ghouse Café is best known for its Hyderabadi Haleem and Hyderabadi Biryani, both celebrated for their crusted textures, aromatic spices, and depth of flavor. Other favorites include Gurda Bhaji, Khichdi Kheema, Dum ki Biryani, Boti Kebabs, Paya (trotters stew), Chicken Nahari Special, Tandoori Chicken, and Sheermal. The extensive menu also features an array of Indian, Chinese, Mughlai, and seafood items as well as vegetarian, bread, and dessert offerings.

The cafe is also noted for Hyderabadi-style breakfast items and local chai, including Dum Ki Chai served at its outlets from early morning. During Ramzan, the crowds surge for take-away haleem, with queues often spilling into the streets as customers seek their annual fix of this traditional delicacy.

== Controversies ==
In 2016, a WhatsApp message spread a rumour alleging that Shah Ghouse Café served dog meat. This was widely circulated sparking widespread panic and media coverage resulting in a complaint lodged by Mohammed Rabbani with the Cyberabad Metropolitan Police. This was later proved to be false after a GHMC inspection collected samples from the restaurant and this led to the arrest of a 22-year-old MBA student, who confessed to originating and spreading the false rumor online. Rabbani alleges that several media houses ran the news without fact-verification resulting in a significant financial loss, temporary reputational harm and a few employees lost their jobs too.
