= Hyderabadi haleem =

Type of haleem popular in the Indian city Hyderabad

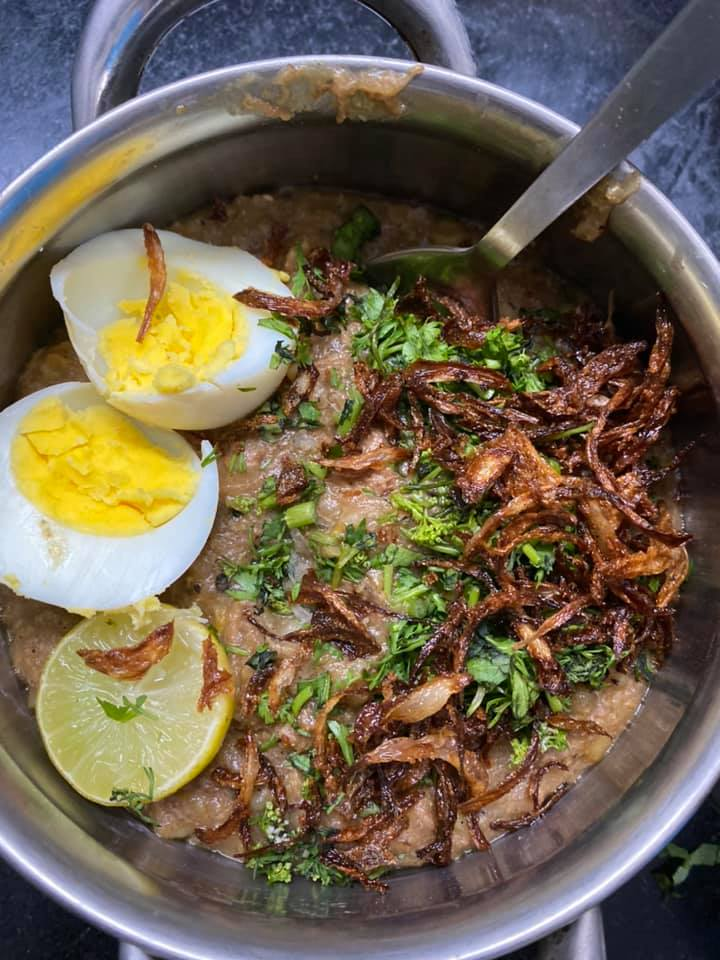
- Hyderabadi mutton haleem garnished with cilantro, egg, fried onion, and lime
- Alternative names: Hyderabadi harees
- Place of origin: India
- Region or state: Hyderabad, Telangana
- Associated cuisine: Indian
- Created by: Originated from the Chaush (Hyderabadi Arabs)
- Main ingredients: Pounded wheat, lentils, goat meat, ghee, dried fruit and saffron

Hyderabadi haleem (/ˈhaɪdərəbɑːdiː həˈliːm/) is a type of haleem popular in the Indian city of Hyderabad. Haleem is a stew composed of meat, lentils, and pounded wheat cooked into a thick paste. It is originally an Arabic dish and was introduced to the Hyderabad State by the Chaush people during the rule of the Nizams (the former rulers of Hyderabad State). Local traditional spices helped a unique Hyderabadi haleem evolve, that became popular among the native Hyderabadis by the 20th century.

The preparation of haleem has been compared to that of Hyderabadi biryani. Though Hyderabadi haleem is the traditional hors d'oeuvre at weddings, celebrations and other social occasions, it is particularly consumed in the Islamic month of Ramadan during Iftar (the evening meal that breaks the day-long fast) as it is high in calories. In recognition of its cultural significance and popularity, in 2010 it was granted Geographical Indication status (GIS) by the Indian GIS registry office, making it the first non-vegetarian dish in India to receive this status. In October 2022, Hyderabadi haleem won 'Most Popular GI' award in the food category, that was chosen through a voting system that was conducted by the Department for Promotion of Industry & Internal Trade (under the Ministry of Commerce and Industry).

== History ==
Haleem originated as an Arabic dish with meat and pounded wheat as the chief ingredients. It was introduced to Hyderabad by the Arab diaspora during the rule of the sixth Nizam, Mahbub Ali Khan, and later became an integral part of Hyderabadi cuisine during the rule of the seventh Nizam, Mir Osman Ali Khan. Sultan Saif Nawaz Jung Bahadur, an Arab chief from Mukalla, Hadhramaut, Yemen, who was among the seventh Nizam's court nobility, popularised it in Hyderabad. Addition of local flavours to the original recipe resulted in a taste distinct from other types of haleem.

== Preparation ==
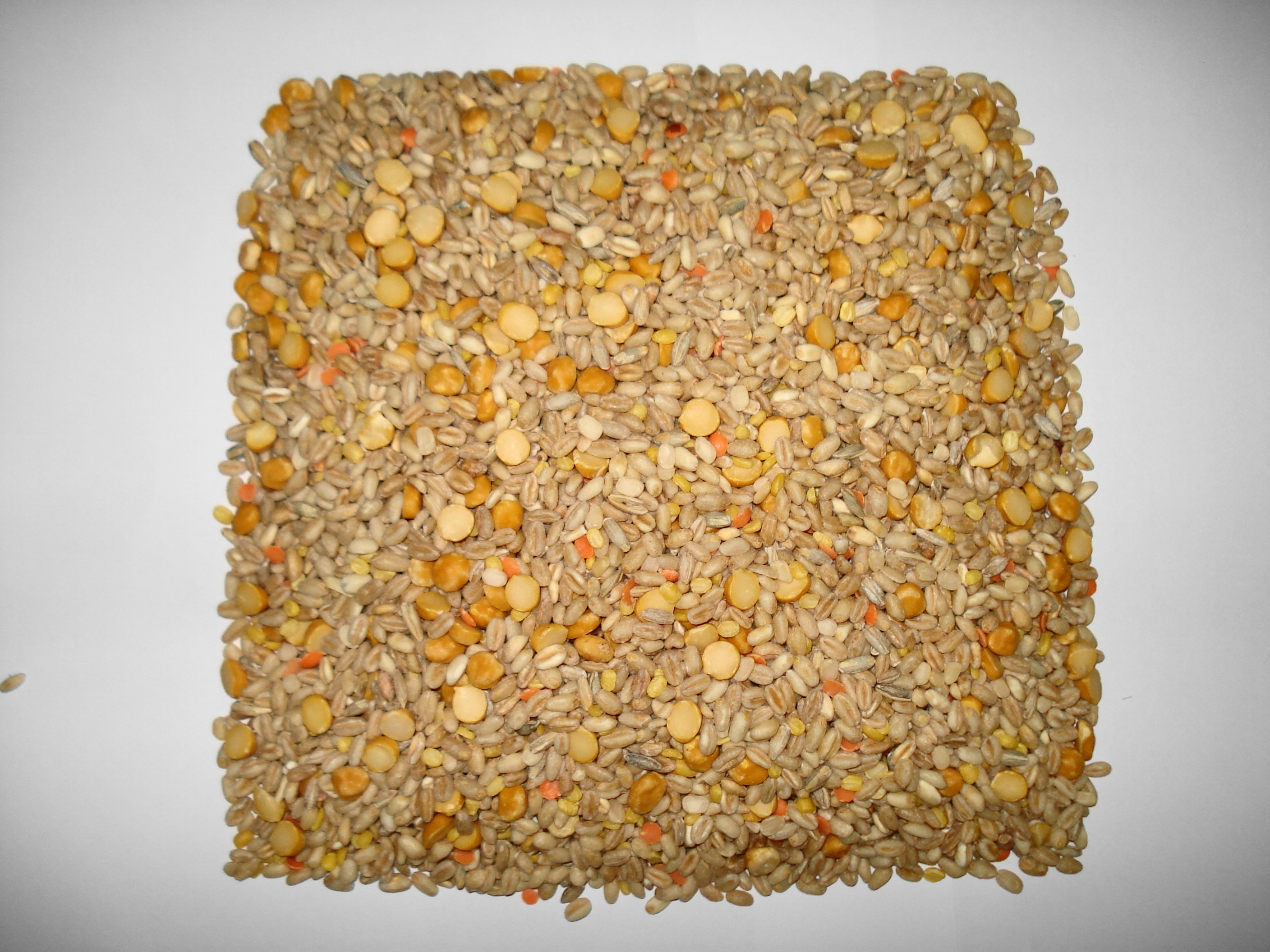
Mixed wheat, dal and other grains

Traditionally, Hyderabadi haleem is cooked on a low flame of firewood for up to 12 hours in a bhatti (a cauldron covered with a brick and mud kiln). One or two people are required to stir it continuously with wooden paddles throughout its preparation. For home-made Hyderabadi haleem, a Ghotni (a wooden hand masher) is used to stir it until it reaches a sticky-smooth consistency, similar to minced meat.

=== Ingredients ===
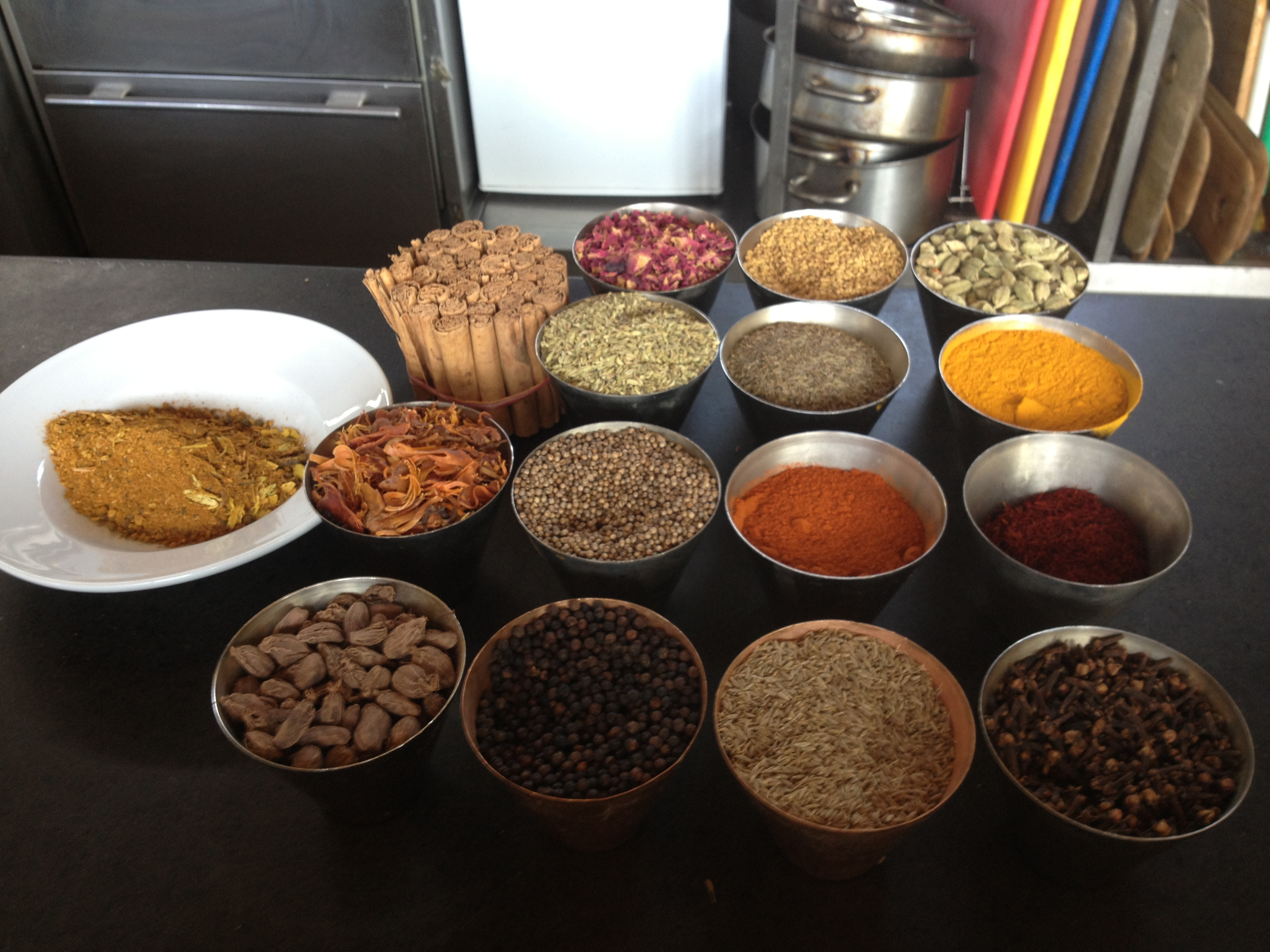
Spices used in preparing Hyderabadi Haleem

The ingredients include meat (either goat meat, beef or chicken); pounded wheat; ghee—(milk fat rendered from butter, also called clarified butter); milk; lentils; ginger and garlic paste; turmeric; red chili pepper spices such as cumin seeds, caraway seeds (shah zeera), cinnamon, cardamom, cloves, black pepper, saffron, jaggery, natural gum, cubeb (kabab cheeni); and dry fruits such as pistachio, cashew, fig and almond. It is served hot topped with a ghee-based gravy, pieces of lime, chopped coriander, sliced boiled egg and fried onions as garnish.

=== Variations ===
Different variants have been introduced catering to regional tastes and requirements. A meethi (sweet) variant of haleem is consumed as breakfast by the Arab diaspora in Barkas neighbourhood of the city. The chicken variant is less popular, even though it is lower priced. A vegetarian version of haleem, in which dry fruits and vegetables are substituted for goat meat, is available at some eateries in Hyderabad.

== Nutrition ==
External image
- A slideshow of Hyderabadi haleem preparation images. Published on Flickr

Hyderabadi haleem is a high calorie dish which gives instant energy as it contains slow-digesting and fast-burning ingredients. It also contains dry fruits rich in anti-oxidants. The meat and dry fruits make it a high protein food. A new low-cholesterol variety by using emu meat, rich in minerals, phosphorus and vitamins, was introduced in 2013. The Greater Hyderabad Municipal Corporation (GHMC), a local civic body that monitors health and safety regulations in the city, has set up hygiene and quality standards to be followed by the eateries selling it.

== Popularity ==
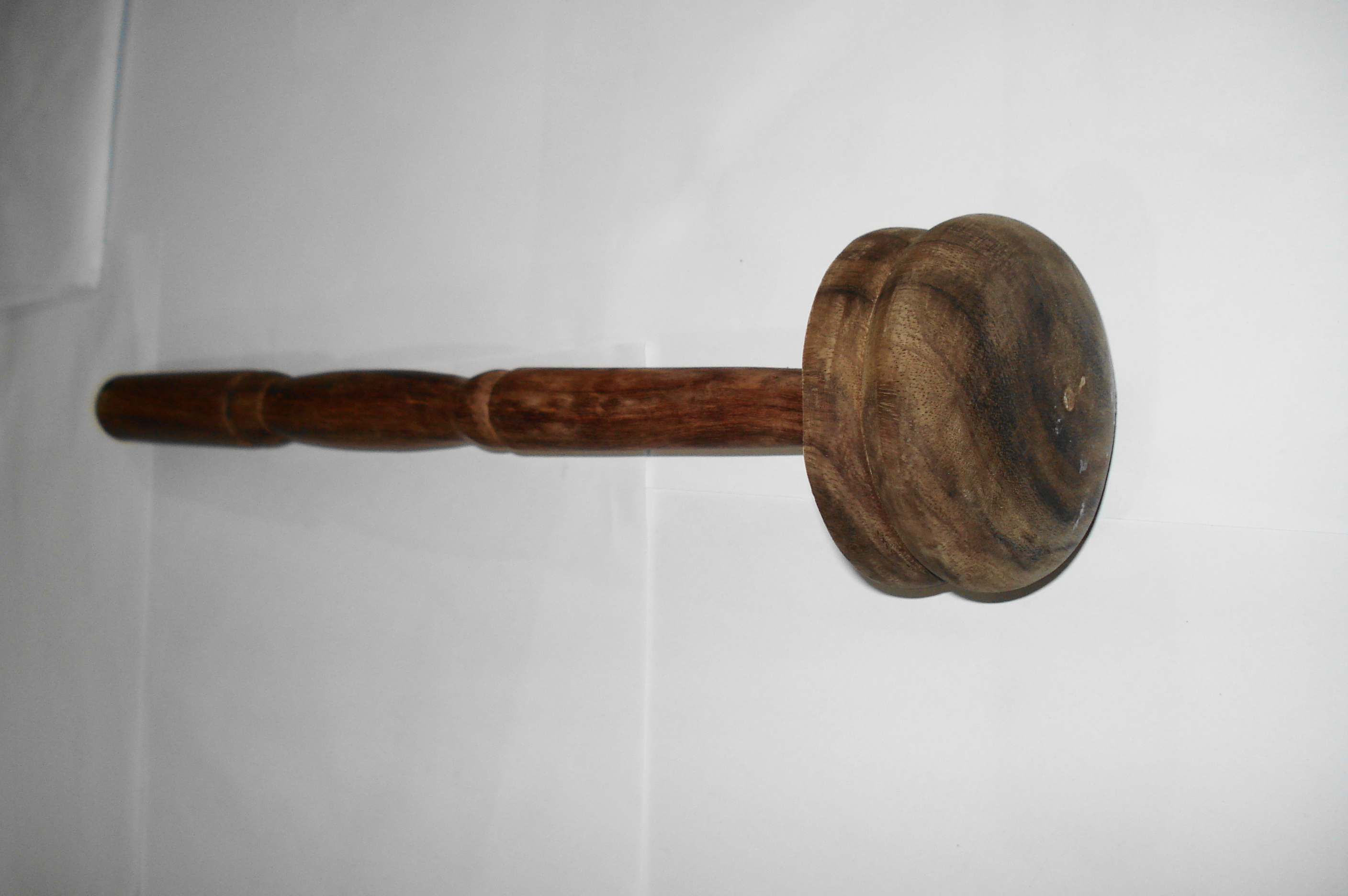
Ghotni a wooden hand masher, used to muddle meat and wheat while cooking haleem until it becomes a thick paste.

Hyderabadi haleem is regarded as an international delicacy. In Hyderabad, the dish is often consumed at celebratory events such as weddings. It is consumed especially during Iftaar, the evening meal following the day-long fast, observed by Muslims during the month of Ramadan.

=== Places of interest ===
Pista House, Hotel Shadab, Paradise, Shah Ghouse Café, Cafe 555, Grill 9, Pariwar's Have More, Cafe Bahar, Chicha's, Peshawar, Sarvi and Grand Hotel are some of the many places to try Haleem in Hyderabad

In Hyderabad and neighbouring areas, the month of Ramadan is synonymous with Hyderabadi haleem. During the 2014 Ramadan season, ₹ 5 billion worth of Hyderabadi haleem was sold in the city, and an additional 25,000 people were employed in the preparation and sale of haleem. The connoisseur chefs are paid salaries of up to ₹100,000 (US$1,100) a month plus benefits, As of 2011, during Ramadan there were 6,000 eateries throughout the city that sold haleem (70% of which are temporary until Ramadan ends), and 28% of Hyderabadi haleem produced in the city was exported to 50 countries throughout the world.

Sanjeev Kapoor, an entrepreneur of Indian cuisine, mentions in his book Royal Hyderabadi Cooking that the preparation of haleem in Hyderabad has become an art form, much like the Hyderabadi biryani. In 2010 Hyderabadi haleem was awarded Geographical Indication status by the Indian GI registry office. It became the first meat product of India to receive a GI certification. This means that a dish cannot be sold as Hyderabadi haleem unless it meets the necessary standards laid down for it.

== See also ==
- List of stews
- Hyderabadi cuisine
