= List of Pakistani soups and stews =

This is a list of Pakistani soups and stews. Pakistani cuisine is a refined blend of various regional cooking traditions of South Asia. The cuisine significantly varies in different areas of the country. Pakistani cuisine is known for its richness and flavor.

== Pakistani soups and stews ==
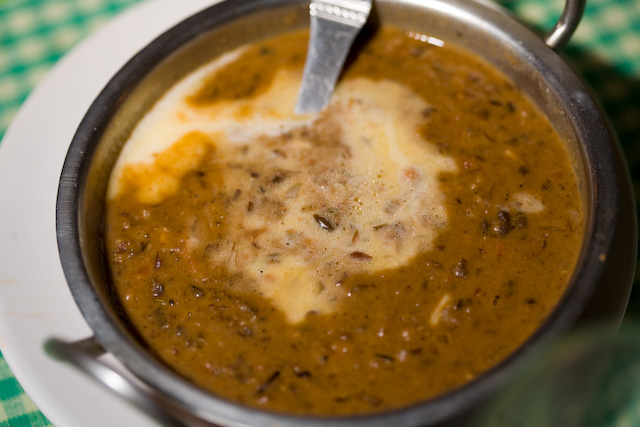
Dal makhani

- Abgooshth – lamb and lentil soup
- Chakna – tripe stew with chunks of liver and kidneys
- Shorva – Chorba (called shorba in Pakistan) is one of various kinds of soup or stew found in national cuisines across the Balkans, Eastern Europe, Central Asia, and the Middle East
- Haleem – prepared with wheat, barley, chicken, goat or buffalo meat, lentils and spices
- Kadhi – a spicy dish whose thick gravy is based on chickpea flour, and contains vegetable fritters called pakoras, to which sour yogurt is added. In Pakistan, it is usually served with boiled rice and naan. Fish karhi and egg karhi are also popular.
- Khichra – a variation of the dish Haleem, popular with Muslims of South Asia. It is prepared with lentils, rice, meat and spices.
- Nihari – regarded as a national dish of Pakistan
- Siri paya − a Pakistani delicacy, its main ingredients are the hoof (trotters) and head of a lamb or goat, cooked with cilantro and ginger.
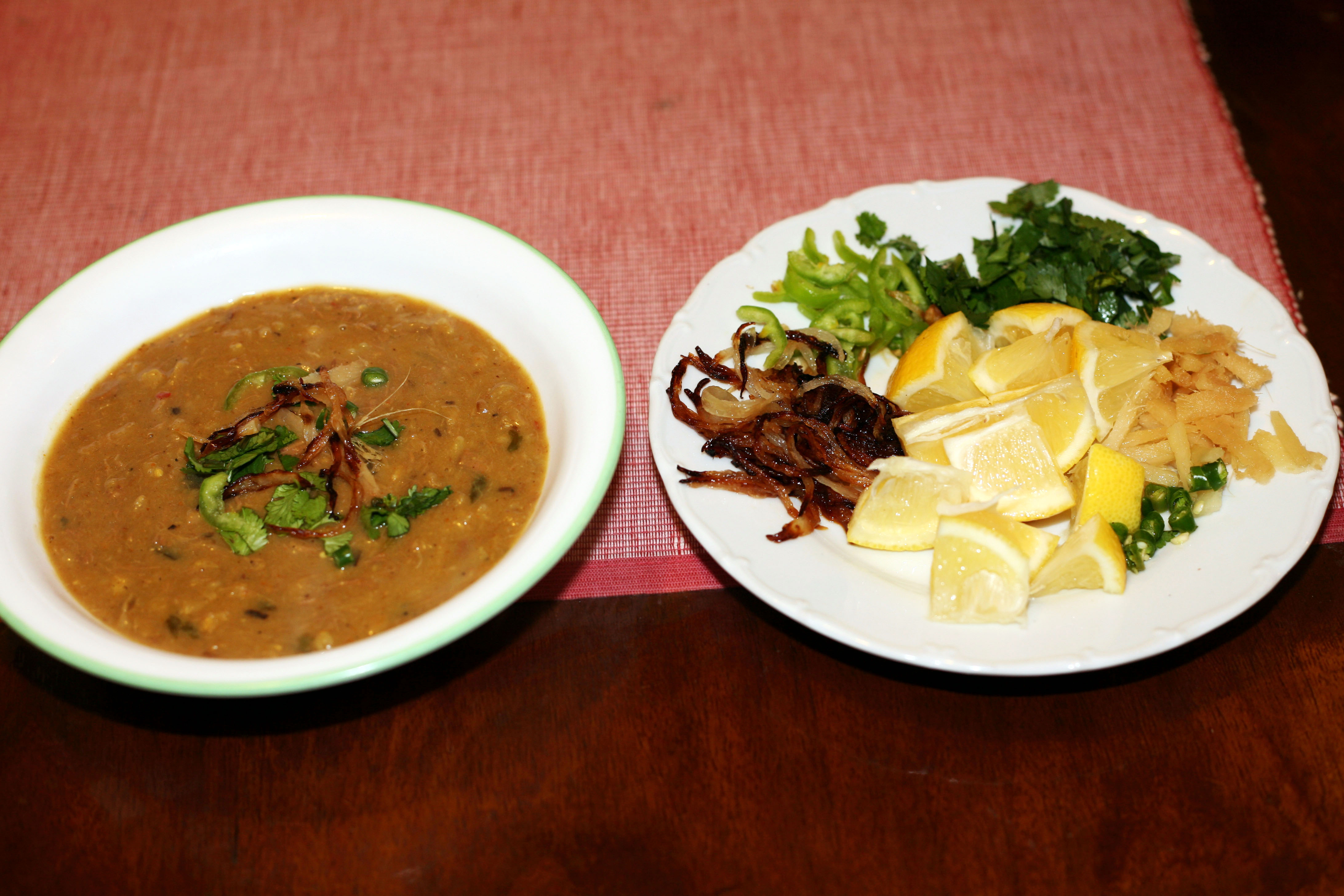
Pakistani haleem served with garnish

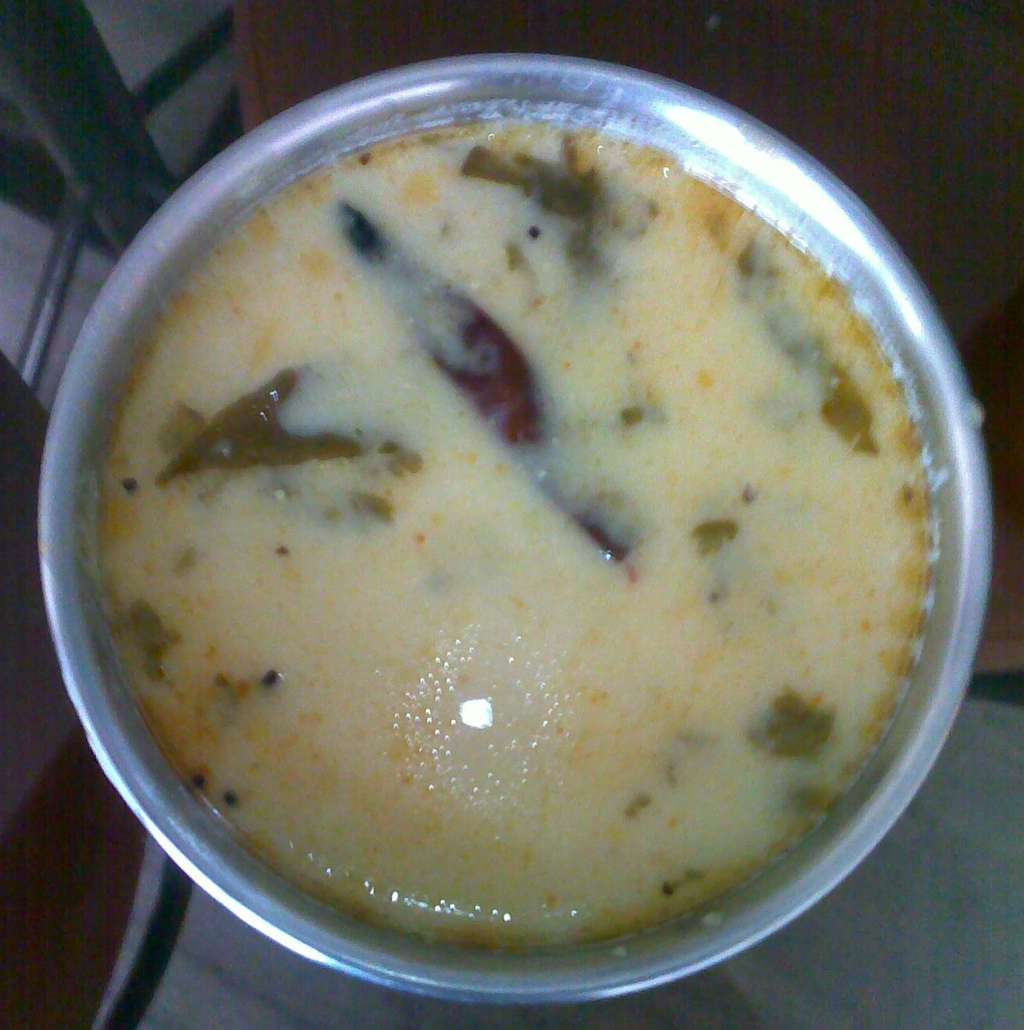
Kadhi

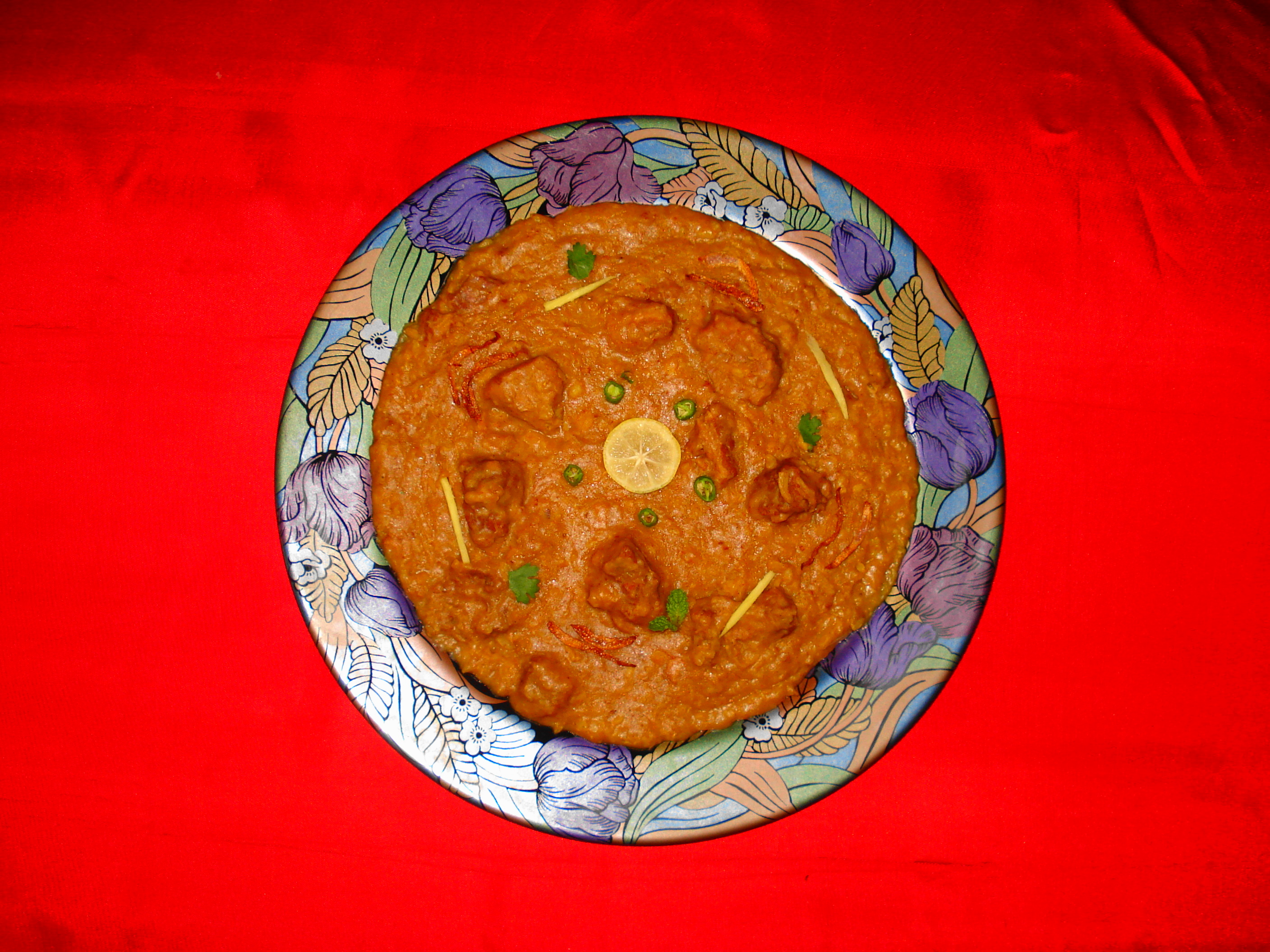
Khichra

== See also ==
- List of soups
- List of stews
- Pakistani meat dishes
