= Chakna =

Indian spicy stew

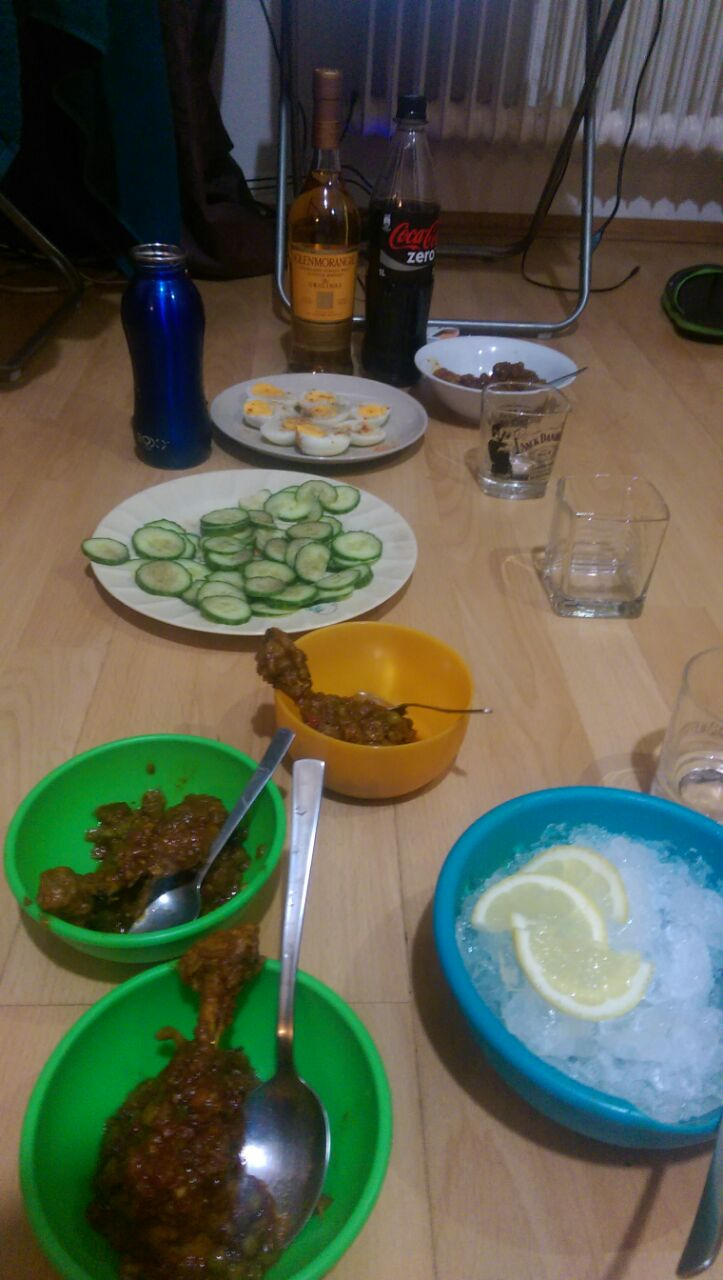
- Place of origin: India
- Region or state: South India
- Main ingredients: Goat tripe, spices

Chakna or chaakna is a spicy stew, originating from the Indian subcontinent, made out of goat tripe and other animal digestive parts. It is a speciality among Hyderabadi Muslims. In all other parts of India, chakna refers to any snacks/finger foods for consumption with alcohol. The tripe stew includes chunks of liver and kidneys. It is usually taken with liquors throughout India.

== See also ==
- List of goat dishes
- List of Pakistani soups and stews
- List of stews
