= Keşkek =

Anatolian meat and grain stew

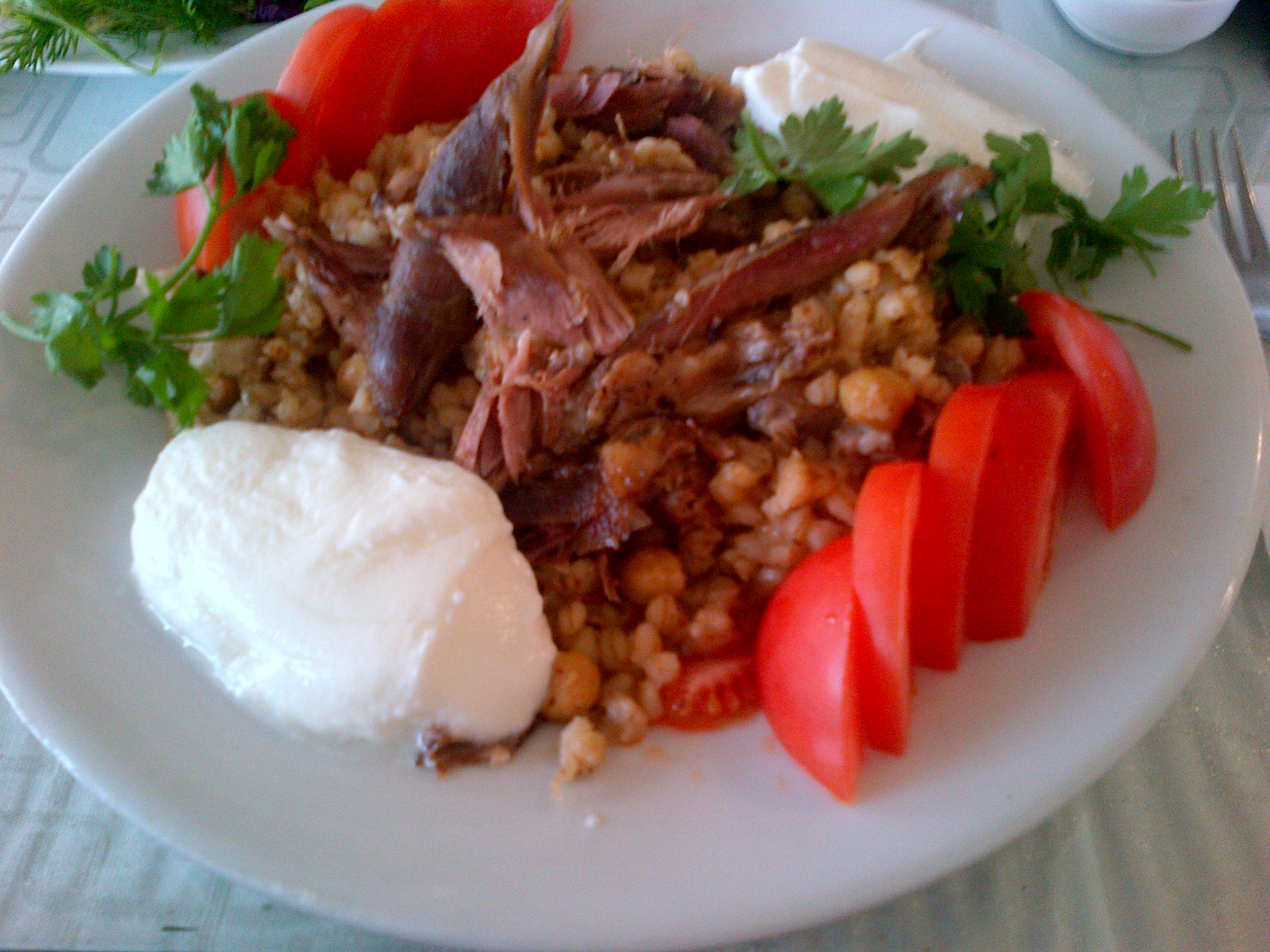
- A keşkek meal from Tokat, Turkey
- Alternative names: kashkak, kashkek, keške
- Type: Stew
- Associated cuisine: Turkish, Iranian, Greek, Armenian, and Balkan
- Main ingredients: Meat or chicken and wheat or barley

Ceremonial keşkek tradition
- UNESCO Intangible Cultural Heritage
- Country: Turkey
- Reference: 00388
- Region: Europe and North America

Inscription history
- Inscription: 2011 (6th session)
- List: Representative

Keşkek, also known as kashkak, kashkek, or keške, or keskek, is a ceremonial meat or chicken and wheat or barley stew found in Turkish, Iranian, Greek, Armenian, and Balkan cuisines.

In 2011, keşkek was confirmed to be an Intangible Cultural Heritage of Turkey by UNESCO.

== History ==
The first known written reference to the dish is found in a copy of Danishmendname dating back to 1360. Keşkek is documented in Iran and the region of Syria by Turkish tribes as early as the 15th century; it is still consumed by many today, traditionally during religious festivals, weddings and funerals.

The dish's name alludes to kashk, which in 16th- to 18th-century Iran had sheep's milk added to wheat or barley flour and meat, mixed in equal parts.

Under the name of κεσκέκ, κεσκέκι and κισκέκ (keskék, keskéki, and kiskék), it is a festival dish in Lesbos and among Pontian Greeks. In Lesbos, keşkek is prepared on summer nights when a ceremonial bull is being slaughtered, which is then cooked overnight and eaten next day with wheat.

Keşkek is called haşıl in Northeast and Middle Anatolia regions in Turkey.

The Slavic word kasha may have been borrowed from the Persian کَشک : kishk.

Keşkek is known as harissa in Armenia. Harissa bears strong similarities to keşkek in terms of its preparation and cooking process; however, harissa is associated with different symbolic meanings.

== UNESCO controversy ==
In 2008, after requests by various local intangible heritage boards across Turkey, the Turkish Ministry of Culture began preparing for the registration of keşkek on the Representative List of UNESCO. The sociologist Bahar Aykan explains in International Journal of Heritage Studies that at the local level, the Turkish government prepared the nomination in dialogue with Turkish heritage experts, culture-bearers, and representatives of relevant voluntary associations and public institutions across the country. However, at the international level, the Turkish government decided to submit the registration by itself, and did not contact the authorities in Armenia for a joint file. The Turkish nomination of keşkek meant to present it as an exclusively "Turkish" heritage, deliberately giving the impression that it is exclusively found within the borders of the Republic of Turkey. In terms of geographic spread, the Turkish keşkek registration at UNESCO states that the keşkek tradition is widely practiced across Turkey in its rural parts, and cites 43 out of 81 provinces. While the registration mentions, in detail, keşkek being part of Turkey's national heritage and outlines its significance for constructing a shared identity across the country, it both omits mentioning keşkek's transnational character as well as the customs and practices associated with it outside of Turkey's (immediate) borders. In addition, while the nomination does mention the various alternate names attributed to keşkek, such as kişkah and keşkef, it omits the name herisa, despite the dish being commonly known as such in Turkey's east as well as amongst Armenians in Turkey. The UNESCO website's link on keşkek also refers to it as a "traditional Turkish ceremonial dish".

In Armenia, the admission of the Turkish request was met with public outrage, and was referred to as the "Turkification" of harissa. Several major Armenian newspapers published articles criticising Turkey's UNESCO registration of harissa as a Turkish product and argued for the Armenian origins of the dish. Armenia Now, a popular Armenian internet portal, referred to the admission as "UNESCO puts Armenian harisa on list of Turkish national dishes", and elaborated that it had led to outrage in the country. On Armenian internet forums the problem was likewise discussed. Many of its users believed that the UNESCO listing tantamounted to culture theft and blamed UNESCO for being supportive in helping Turkey trying to appropriate Armenian heritage. The Development and Preservation of Armenian Culinary Traditions (DPACT), an Armenian NGO, also joined the opposition to the listing of the dish. A few days following UNESCO's admission, DPACT held a press conference in the Armenian capital of Yerevan. During the conference, conference participants claimed Armenia as being the authentic owner of harissa, and argued that it was impossible for the dish being Turkish for the utensils, techniques and ingredients used are of Armenian origin. DPACT also announced that it intended to plan working with Armenian historians and ethnographers in order to prove harissa's Armenian origins, and thereby ultimately appealing UNESCO's decision. Ultimately, UNESCO's listing of Turkey's request received as much public attention as Armenia's opposition to it.

Turkish newspapers, in return to the response in Armenia, explained DPACT's efforts unanimously as constituting "false" claims. One Turkish newspaper, the Yeni Şafak, in its heading entitled '"keşkek is Turkish" decision outraged the Armenians', argued that although UNESCO had already "decided" on keşkek's nationality by incorporating it into "Turkish national heritage", a portion of Armenians "still claim that it is not originally a Turkish dish". The Turkish National Commission for UNESCO eventually also joined the controversy. Öcal Oğuz, its director, issued a press release, "stating that while the ICH Convention is not for portioning out intangible heritage among countries, UNESCO's conservation approach is often mistaken with EU's patent policy". Oğuz elaborated that if Armenia holds a tradition which bears similarities to Turkey's keşkek, they could perhaps apply separately to UNESCO. Aykan explains that Oğuz refrained from mentioning that the Convention is "not in favour of listing elements as separate entities because it stresses that transnational heritage is better protected in its totality through joint protection efforts, which would also strengthen dialogue, respect, and understanding among cultures". Since then, neither Armenia nor Turkey have shown willingness to collaborate with each other for an extended inscription at UNESCO in relation to keşkek/harissa. Aykan explains that "this may not come as a surprise when one considers the historically troubled relations between these countries". Aykan concludes stating that Turkey's unilateral listing of keşkek at UNESCO initiated efforts by Armenian state and heritage NGO's to identify and promote other transnational dishes such as tolma and lavash as national heritage, which in turn initiated new "ownership conflicts" over food in the region.

== See also ==
- Kibbeh
- Haleem
- Harees
- Cholent

== Bibliography ==
- Françoise Aubaile-Sallenave, "Al-Kishk: the past and present of a complex culinary practice", in Sami Zubaida and Richard Tapper, A Taste of Thyme: Culinary Cultures of the Middle East, London and New York, 1994 and 2000, ISBN 1-86064-603-4. excerpts
