= Hrisseh =

Hrisseh is a traditional Lebanese porridge consisting primarily of wheat and chicken or meat. It is cooked during two major Lebanese religious occasions. Within the Lebanese Shia community, hrisseh is prepared during the commemoration of Ashoura, while the Lebanese Christian community prepares it on the day of the Assumption of the Virgin Mary.

== Shia community ==
Lebanese Shia prepare hrisseh during the commemoration of Ashoura, a significant religious occasion for Shia Muslims. It is generally distributed to family, friends, neighbours, and poor people.

== Christian community ==
=== Bhamdoun ===
Hrisseh is the main dish cooked on the day of the Assumption of the Virgin Mary, also known as Eid el Saydeh. Usually, the preparations start early in the morning on August 14 every year, the eve of the Assumption.

Designated men and women from the village of Bhamdoun, a village 23 kilometers away from Beirut with Maronite and Orthodox Christians forming a majority of its inhabitants. They gather outside the yard of Saint George's church and start preparing an open-base fire to support three cauldrons of food. Wood and coal are used to keep the fire burning all night until all the ingredients dissolve and combine. The recipe requires 800 kg of meat lamb, water, and wheat. Usually the celebrations and tasting start late in the evening. The celebration consists of an evening mass at Saint George's church, religious and art exhibitions, parades, fireworks, and food corners and at the end the open distribution of the hrisseh.

== History ==
Although it is not fully researched, the story says that in the 19th century approximately around the year 1851, a disastrous plague hit the village of Bhamdoun.

== Ingredients ==
It consists mainly of hulled wheat, cubed meat shanks, and lamb bones, seasoned with peppercorns, bay leaves, cinnamon, and salt.

== Instructions ==
The methods of preparation vary slightly from one region to another, but in general the hrisseh is composed principally of lamb meat mixed with the lamb's bones, wheat and water. The whole mixture is heated inside big pots until it reaches its boiling point. It is recommended to maintain a firm constant mix of the mixture at high temperatures and it is also required to reduce the temperature before adding the wheat to prevent it from forming clots. The hrisseh needs to be cooked for more than five hours to ensure a balanced thick dish as an end result. Finally, elasticity indicates that the meat is cooked. The final step is adding salt. Then the hot meal is usually directly served in warm bowls alongside a traditional Lebanese sweet, el tamrieh.
