= Harees =

Armenian and Middle Eastern cracked wheat and meat porridge

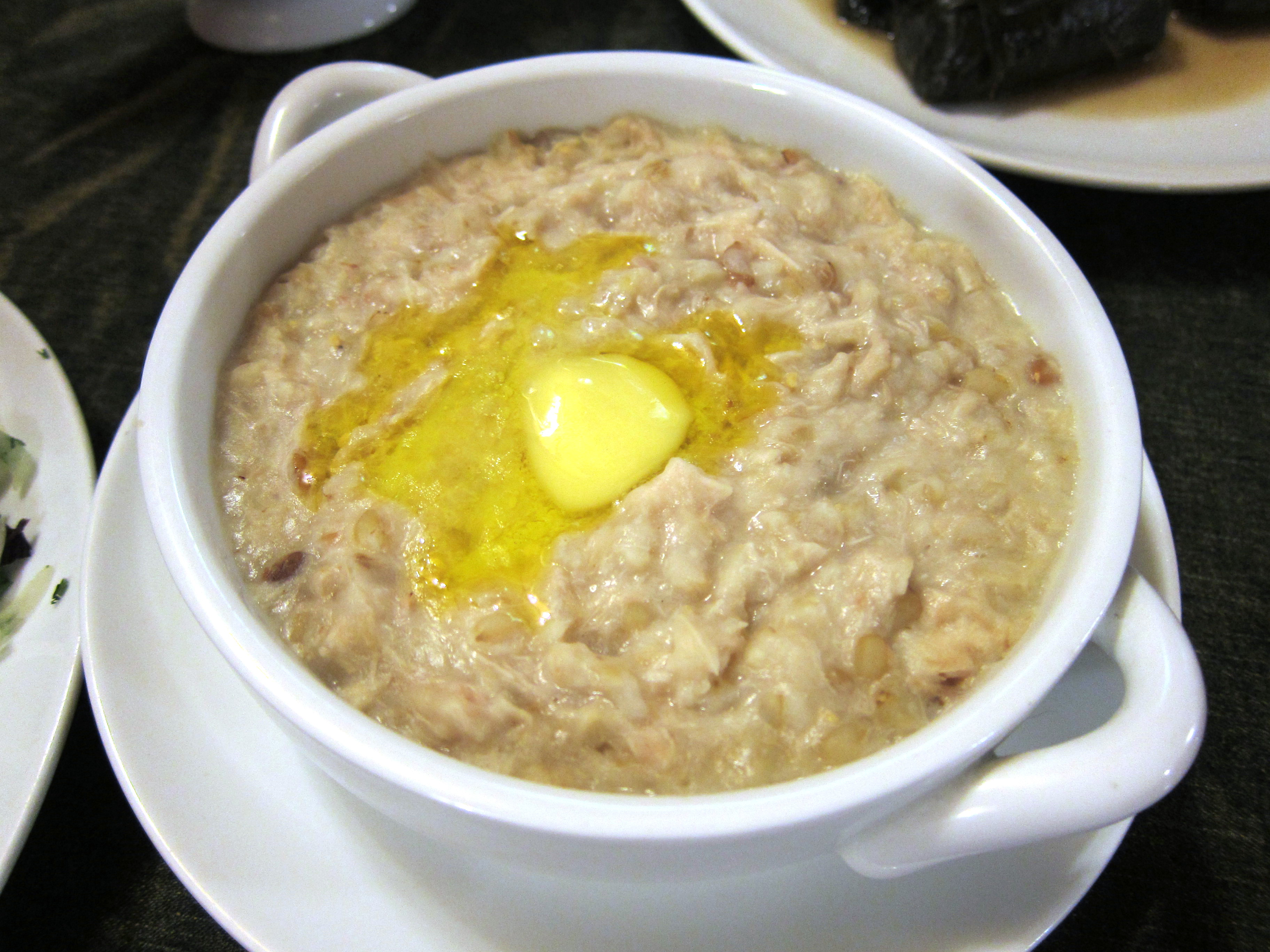
- Harisa
- Alternative names: Hareesa, arizah, harisa, jarish
- Type: Porridge
- Course: Main course
- Place of origin: Armenia; Arabian Peninsula
- Region or state: Western Asia
- Main ingredients: Wheat, butter, and meat (usually mutton but sometimes chicken)

Harees dish: know-how, skills and practices
- UNESCO Intangible Cultural Heritage
- Country: Qatar, Oman, Yemen, Saudi Arabia, Bahrain, United Arab Emirates and Kuwait
- Reference: 01744
- Region: Arab States

Inscription history
- Inscription: 2023 (18th session)
- List: Representative

Harees, haresa, hareesa, arizah, harise, jarish, jareesh, (Arabic: هريس), harisa (Armenian: հարիսա), or korkot (Armenian: կորկոտ) is a dish of boiled, cracked, or coarsely-ground cracked wheat or bulgur, mixed with meat, spices, and butter. Its consistency varies between a porridge and a gruel. Harees is known throughout Armenia where it is served on Easter, and the Arab world, where it is commonly eaten in Arab states of the Persian Gulf in the month of Ramadan, and in Iraq, Lebanon and Bahrain during Ashura by Shia Muslims.

== Etymology ==
Armenian etymology explains the word as coming from a saint‘s words, as according to folklore, Saint Gregory advised Harekh, (Armenian: հարի՛ սա, romanized: harí sa, lit. 'churn this!'), thus the name of the dish. While the alternative word korkot (Armenian: կորկոտ) means „groats“ in Armenian.

"Harisa", also transliterated as "horisa", derived from the Arabic verb "haras" meaning "to squish" to describe the action of breaking and pounding the grains before mixing it with water to create a porridge. In Arabic, "Harees" (Arabic: هريس) is linked to the verb (Arabic: هَرَسَ, romanized: harasa) which still means to mash or to squash.

== History ==
According to medieval Armenian lore, the patron saint of Armenia, Gregory the Illuminator, was offering a meal of love and charity to the poor. There weren't enough sheep to feed the crowds so wheat was added to the cooking pots. They noticed that the wheat was sticking to the bottom of the cauldrons. Saint Gregory advised, "Harekh! Stir it!" Thus, the name of the dish, harissa, came from the saint's words. Harissa has been offered as a charity meal ever since. The dish was traditionally served on Easter day.

Harisa is mentioned by Ibn al-Karim in Kitab Al-Tabikh as early as the seventh century. In the anecdotal cookbook, the Umayyad Caliph, Mu'awiya, returns from a trip to Arabia after returning to his newly won Persian lands. In some versions of the story, Mu'awiya is met with some Yemenite Jews whom he asks to prepare the porridge he tasted abroad while in other versions, he approaches locals. This story should be taken with a grain of salt as the author penned the story three centuries after it supposedly occurred.

Harees is documented in Ibn Sayyar al-Warraq's 10th-century cookbook Kitab Al Tabikh., as well as in al-Baghdadi's 13th-century cookbook Kitab Al Tabikh and Ibn Razīn al-Tujībī's 13th-century Andalusian cookbook Kitab Fadalat al-khiwan fi tayyibat al-ta'am w'al-alwan.

Haleem, and cholent originate from harees.

== Preparation ==
The wheat is soaked overnight, then simmered in water along with meat and butter or sheep tail fat. Any remaining liquid is strained and the mixture is beaten and seasoned. Harees may be garnished with cinnamon, sugar, and clarified butter.

== Variants and traditions ==
There is a different traditional way of preparing Harees in each of the Arab countries in the Arabian Peninsula area, and among the tribes of these countries. Some variations include the use of cardamom pods in Saudi Arabia, or a garnish with parsley. Before the Armenian genocide where Armenians were spread through a larger area they also had different variations of Harisa. The wheat used in Armenian harissa is typically shelled (pelted) wheat, though in Adana, harissa was made with կորկոտ (korkot; ground, par-boiled shelled wheat). Harissa can be made with lamb, beef, or chicken.

Harees was only made by the wealthy during Ramadan and Eid, for the duration of a three- to seven-day wedding. It was, however, customary for the Harees dishes to be shared with poorer neighbours on such occasions.

It is similar to kashkeg, a kind of homogeneous porridge made of previously stewed and boned chicken or lamb and coarsely ground soaked wheat (typically shelled wheat).

=== Arab cuisine ===
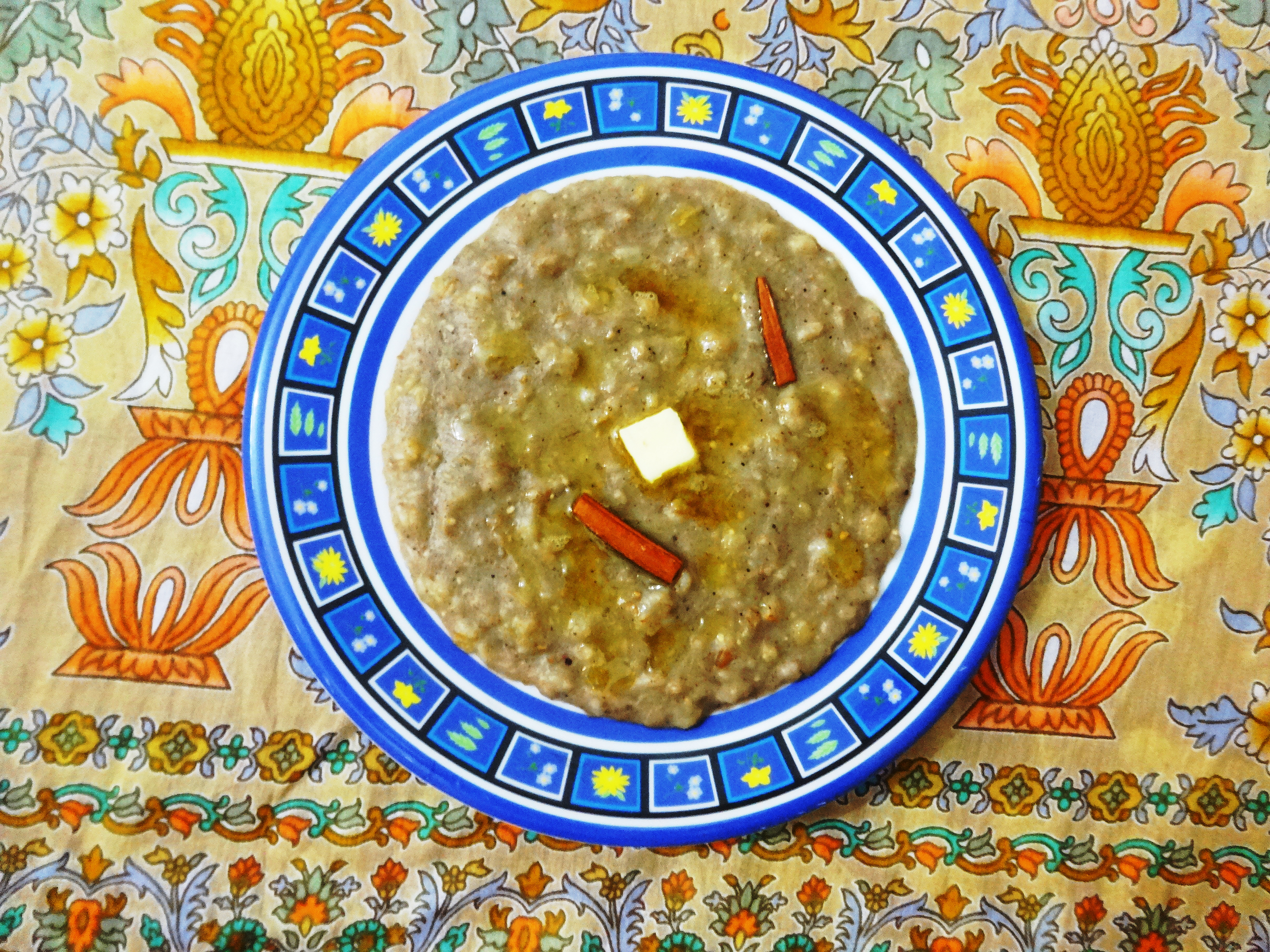
Harees

Harees is a popular dish in Arab cuisine, from the Levant to the Persian Gulf. It is often served during Ramadan, festivals such as Eid ul-Fitr, and at weddings. In Lebanon, it is often cooked on religious occasions in a communal pot, such as in Ashura. Harise is also a common dish in Syrian cuisine and Iraqi cuisine.

Formerly found only in homes, it is now served in restaurants as well.

=== Armenian cuisine ===
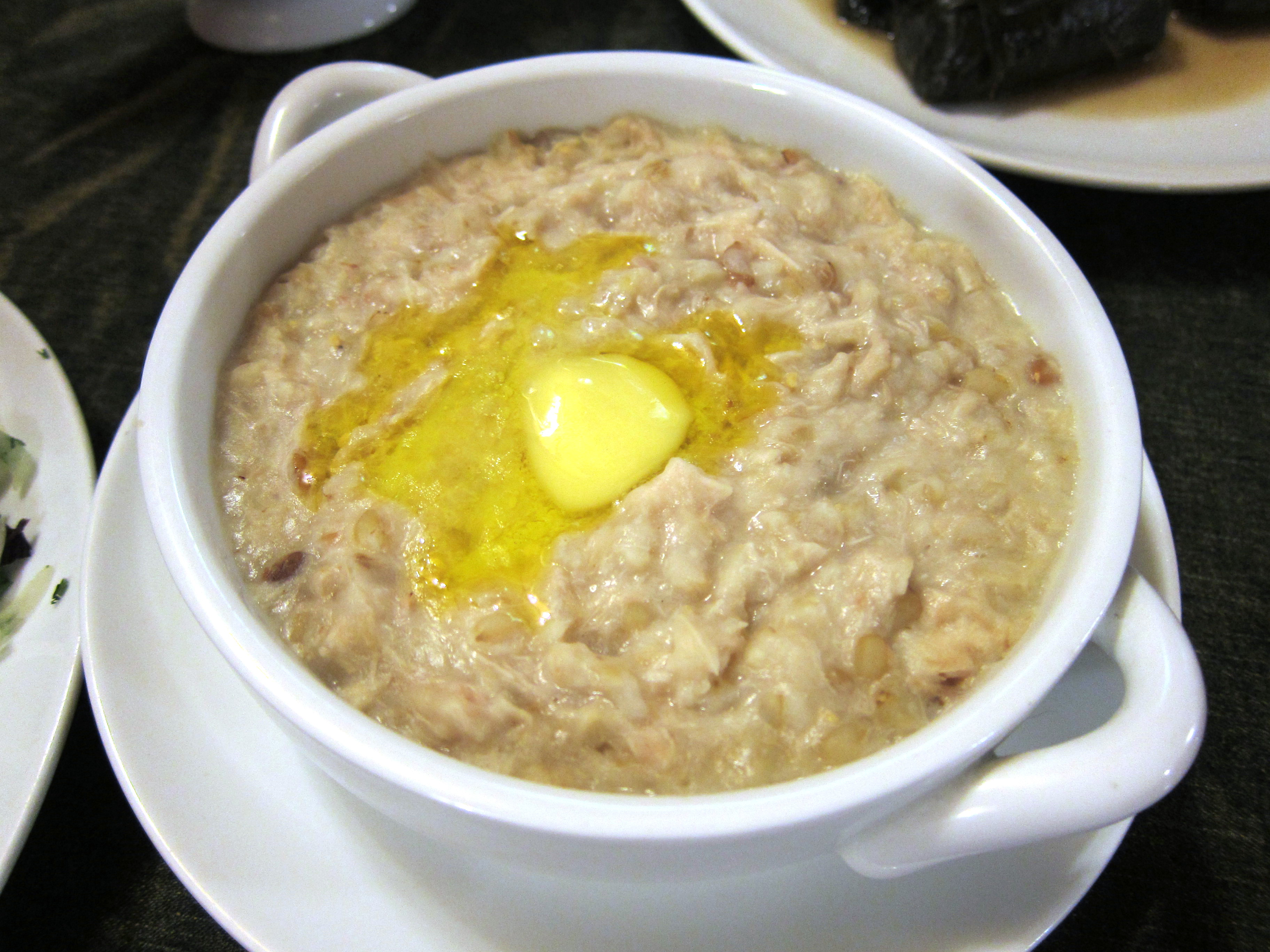
Harisa

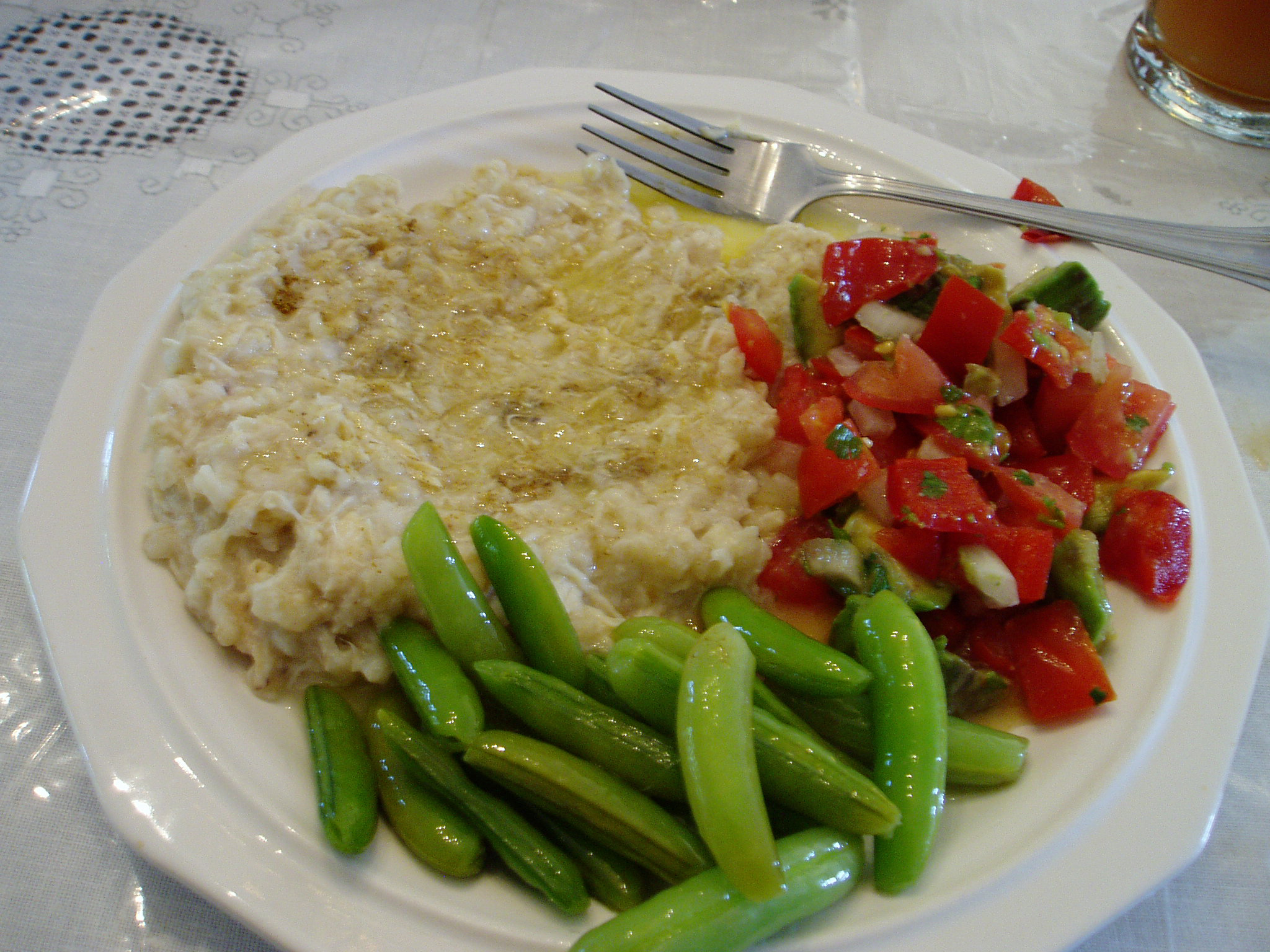
Served with sides

Harisa (Armenian: հարիսա, romanized: harisa) is traditionally served on Easter day, and is considered a national dish of Armenia. It is a thick porridge made from korkot (dried or roasted cracked wheat) and fat-rich meat, usually chicken or lamb. Herbs were substituted for meat in harissa when Armenian religious days required fasting and penance. The extremely long cooking process is an essential part of the harisa tradition. Like other ritual dishes, the time taken for preparation is part of its cherished value. Harissa has been offered as a charity meal since ancient times. The dish was traditionally served on Easter.

Harisa is known for helping the Armenians of Musa Ler (in modern-day Turkey) to survive during the resistance of 1915.

=== Egyptian cuisines ===
In Egyptian cuisine, "freekeh", unripened, crushed durum wheat, was used to cook harisa, giving the resulting ferik a unique green hue. The origin of the variation could be linked to the Sephardic migration of the 13th century, but historians remain uncertain.

=== Kashmiri cuisine ===
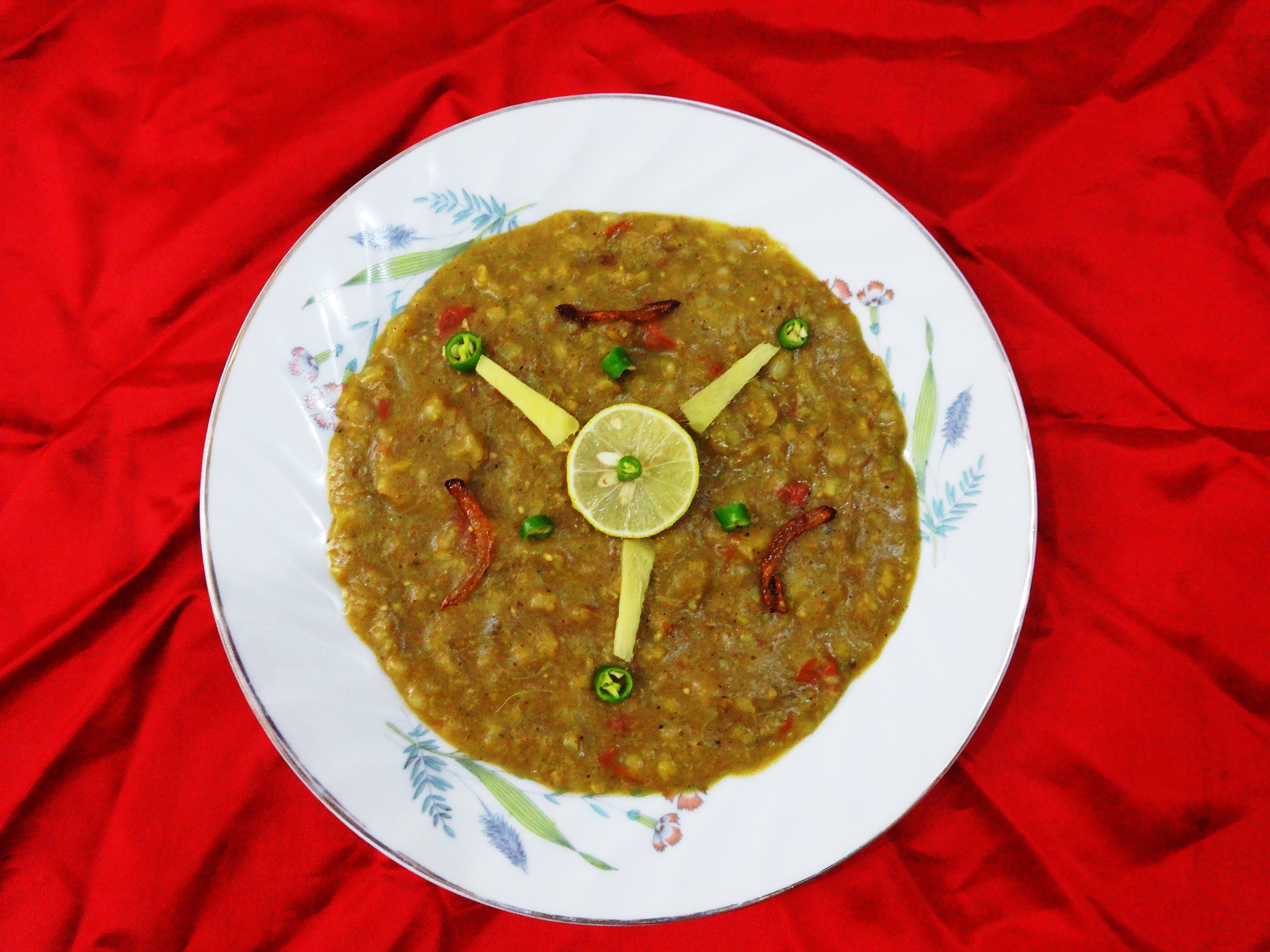
Harisa

Harisa or hareesa (Kashmiri : ۂرؠ سہٕ [hərʲsɨ]) in Kashmir is prepared during winter (Chillai Kalan), typically made of mutton and rice flour and eaten with Kashmiri bread called girda (Kashmiri : گِردٕ [girdɨ] ). It is cooked in huge degs (earthen pots) placed in wood-fired ovens. Downtown Srinagar is considered as the hub of harisa making in Kashmir.

=== Zanzibari ===
In Zanzibar, the dish is called boko boko and may be cooked with lamb, beef, or chicken. This same dish is also served across Tanzania and Kenya.

=== Ethiopia ===
Hareesa, or harees, is a popular dish mainly in the Harari region. It is cooked with lamb or beef and served on Eid or special occasions such as the birth of a baby.

=== Emirati Cuisine ===
Harees is a traditional Emirati dish made from wheat, meat (usually chicken or lamb), and a pinch of salt. The wheat is soaked overnight, then cooked with meat until it reaches a smooth, porridge-like consistency. This hearty dish is particularly popular during Ramadan and festive occasions. It is often garnished with ghee for added flavor. Harees is a staple in Emirati households and showcases the simplicity and richness of Emirati culinary traditions.

== See also ==
- Haleem
- Hrisseh
- Keşkek
- List of porridges
