= Haleem =

Type of stew

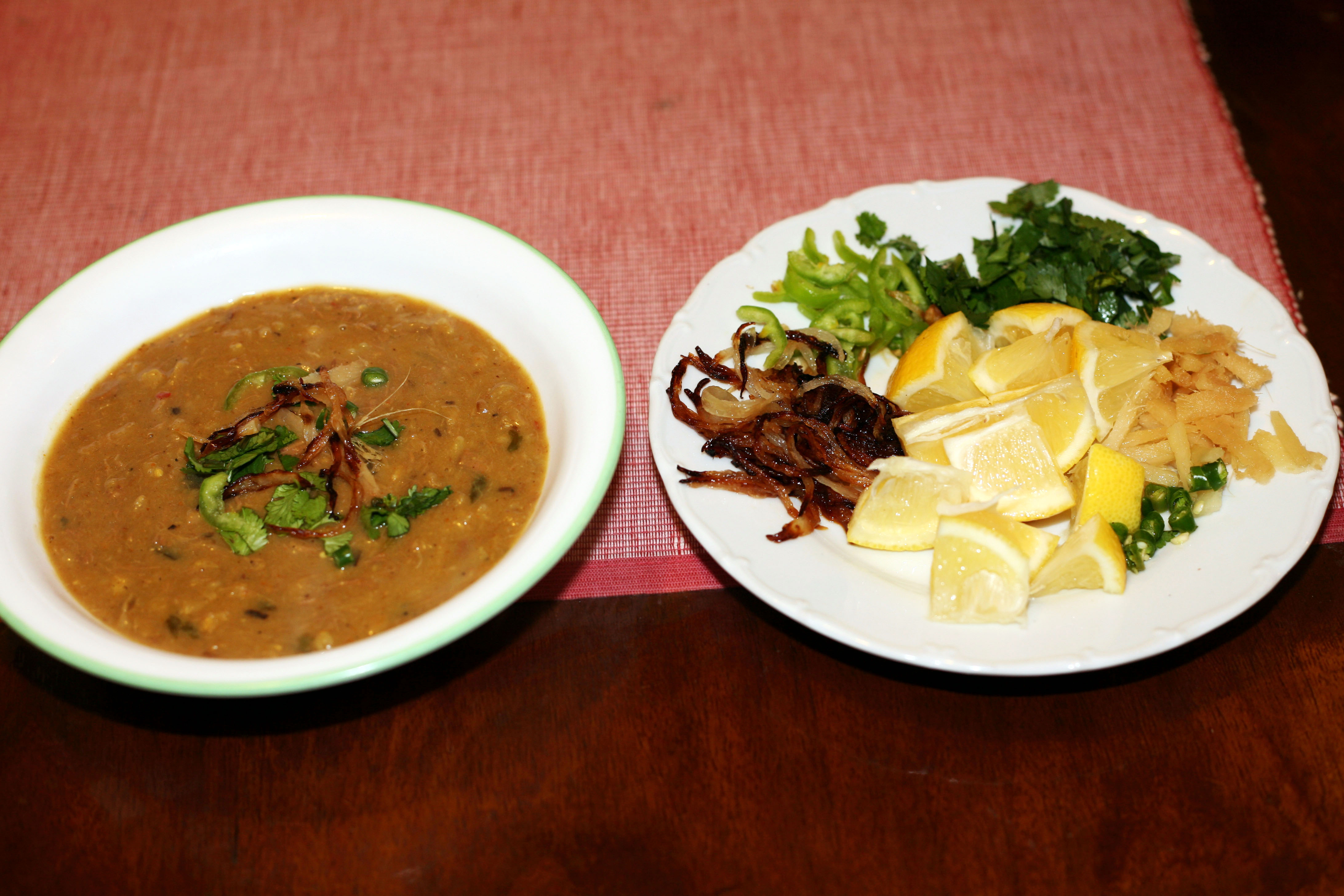
- Haleem is usually garnished with fried onions, coriander, and lime
- Place of origin: Middle East
- Region or state: South Asia, Central Asia, Middle East
- Serving temperature: Hot
- Main ingredients: Wheat, barley, dal, meat
- Variations: Keşkek, harisa, khichra

Haleem or halim is a type of stew that is widely consumed in West Asia, Central Asia and South Asia. Although the dish varies from region to region, it optionally includes wheat or barley, dal, meat, and spices. It is made by slow cooking the meat in barley. It is served hot with flat breads or on its own. Popular variations of haleem include halim (in Iran, Afghanistan, Tajikistan, India, Mauritius, Pakistan and Bangladesh); keşkek (in Turkey, Uzbekistan, Azerbaijan and Northern Iraq); harisa (in the Arab world and Armenia); and Hyderabadi haleem (in India).

== Preparation ==
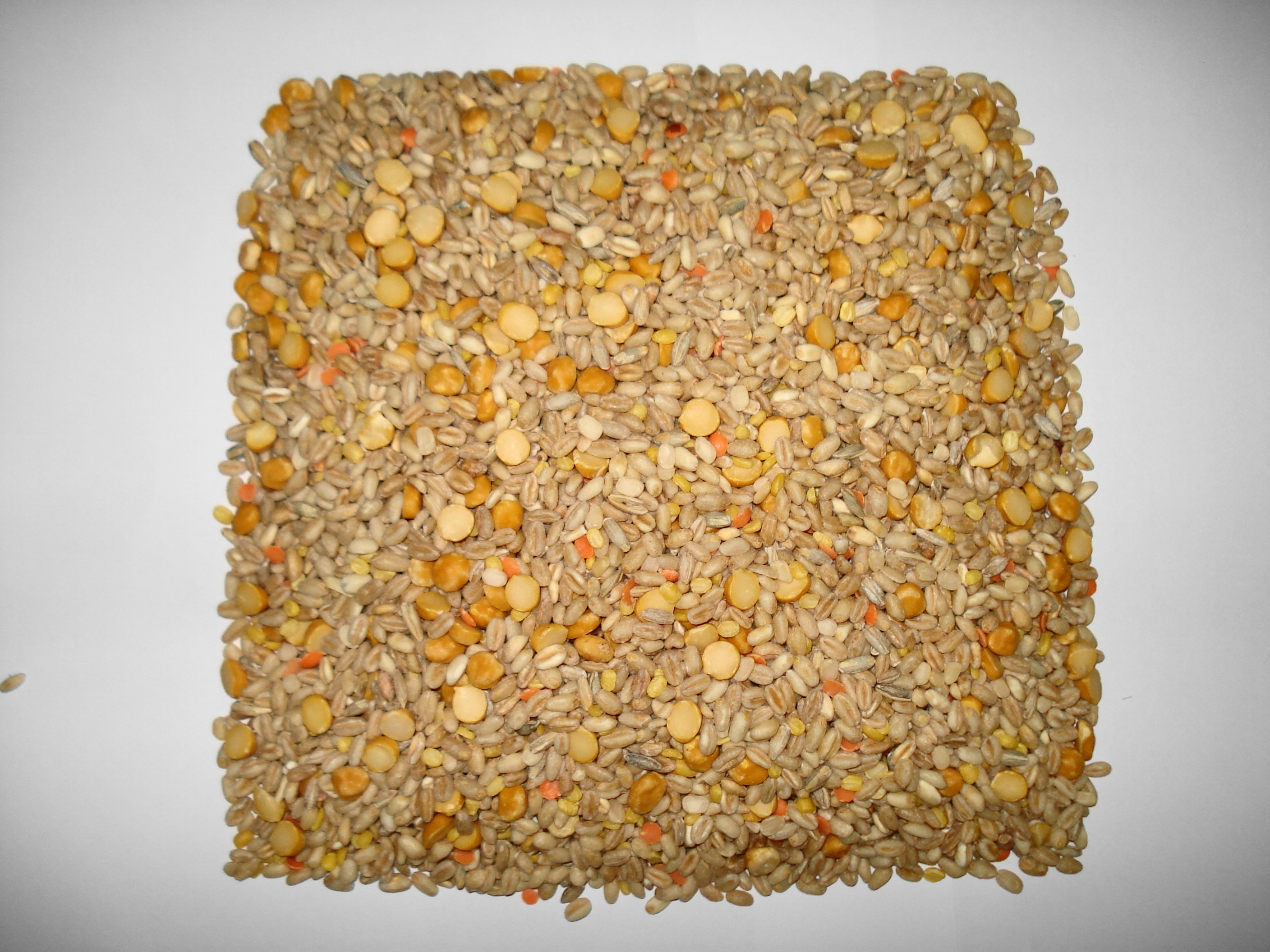
Haleem lentils and grains

Haleem is made of four main components:

- Grain: wheat or barley is almost always present. Pulses (such as lentils) and rice are used depending on the originating region of a recipe.
- Meat: usually beef or lamb and mutton; goat meat; or chicken
- Spices: containing a wide variety, including cassia and fennel, among others.
- Cooking liquid: either water, milk, or a broth.

This dish is slow-cooked for seven to eight hours and then vigorously stirred or beaten with a pestle-like stirring stick. This results in a paste-like consistency, blending the flavors of spices, meat, barley, and wheat.

== Origin ==
Haleem is generally considered to have evolved from the Arab dish known as Harees (also spelled Harisa or Jareesh). According to Shoaib Daniyal, writing in The Sunday Guardian, one of the earliest surviving written recipes for Harees dates to the 10th century, when Abu Muhammad al-Muzaffar ibn Sayyar al-Warraq compiled a cookbook in Baghdad of dishes popular with the "kings and caliphs and lords and leaders" of Baghdad. "The version described in his Kitab Al-Tabikh (Book of Recipes), the oldest surviving Arabic cookbook, is strikingly similar to the one people in the Middle East eat to this day" it reported. Harees subsequently spread to different parts of the Islamic world. Harees was traditionally made with meat, wheat, and sometimes lentils, slow-cooked until soft and porridge-like in consistency. The dish spread across the Islamic world, including Persia, Central Asia, and the Indian subcontinent, through migration, trade, cultural exchange, and military expansion over several centuries.

== History ==
The dish now known as haleem is believed to have been introduced to the Indian subcontinent through Arab traders, missionaries, and military expeditions, particularly between the 12th and 16th centuries. This period marked increased contact between the Middle East and South Asia, facilitated by maritime trade routes in the Arabian Sea and overland connections through Persia and Central Asia. A 10th century cookbook, Kitāb al-Ṭabīkh (Book of Dishes) by Ibn Sayaar Al Warraq, has numerous versions of this porridge.

One of the key phases in this transmission was during the Delhi Sultanate period (1206–1526), when Muslim rule was established across large parts of northern India. Arab and Persian cultural influences, including culinary practices, were introduced by the ruling elite, soldiers, and Sufi saints. Among these influences was harees, a meat and wheat porridge widely consumed in the Arab world.

During the Mughal Empire (1526–1857), which further strengthened Persianate culture in the Indian subcontinent, the dish continued to evolve. The imperial kitchens of the Mughals were known for adapting and refining foreign dishes using indigenous ingredients and spices. Harees gradually transformed into haleem, as local cooks incorporated South Asian spices such as cumin, coriander, turmeric, and garam masala; clarified butter (ghee) for richness; and a more finely blended texture, achieved through slow-cooking and mashing.

As a result, haleem in South Asia became spicier and more aromatic than its Arab counterpart, developing into a unique dish that reflected the regional palate.

== Cultural history ==
Haleem is sold as a snack food in bazaars throughout the year. It is also a special dish prepared throughout the world during the Ramadan and Muharram months of the Muslim Hijri calendar, particularly among Pakistanis and Indian Muslims. The name of this dish is the same as one of the names of Allah, specifically Al Haleem (lit. 'The Forbearing'). Some South Asian Muslims have started to refer to this dish as Daleem, reasoning that it is more correct since the South Asian version of this dish contains large amounts of dal, or lentils. It is mostly still referred to as Haleem.

In Iran, and neighbouring countries, haleem is usually eaten for breakfast. It usually contains meat, such as turkey, and is garnished with cinnamon, sugar, and butter or ghee.

In India, haleem prepared in Hyderabad during the Ramadan month, is transported all over the world through a special courier service. Haleem is traditionally cooked in large, wood-fired cauldrons.

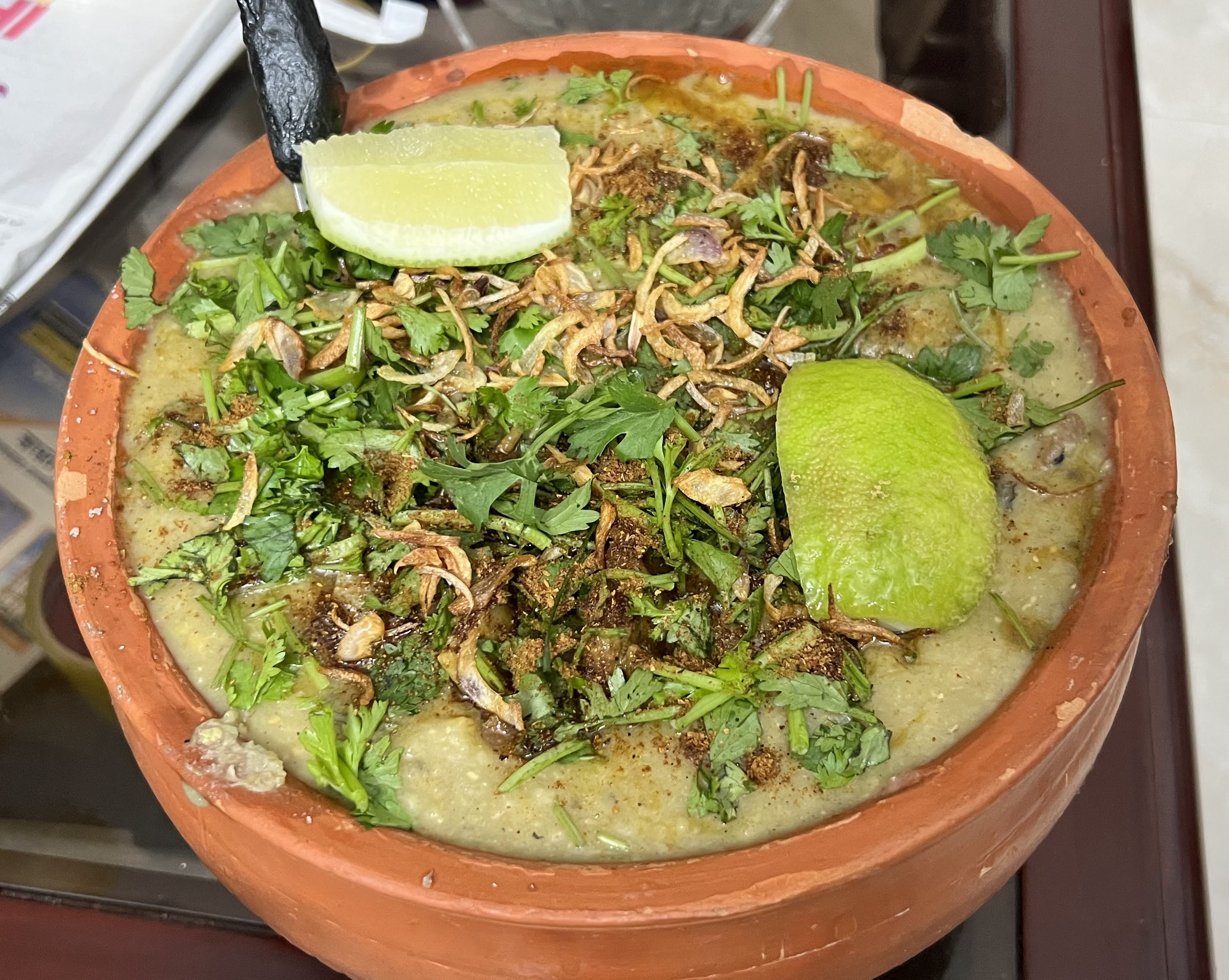
Bangladeshi style Shahi Haleem in Dhaka

Haleem is also very popular in Bangladesh, especially during the holy month of Ramadan, when it is a staple dish. However, the Bangladeshi version of halim differs from other areas slightly as the meat and bones are stewed and kept as small pieces instead of mashing them with the lentil soup. In addition, the variety of spices used is also different. One common Bangladeshi version of Halim is called "Shahi Halim"; it is mostly popular in the central part of the country.

In Pakistan, Haleem is available all year round, as well as in most Pakistani restaurants around the world. Haleem is sold as a snack food and street food in Pakistani bazaars throughout the year.

It is a tradition among Persian Jews to eat haleem on Shabbat, since like other Shabbat stews such as cholent and hamin it's a slow-cooked dish that can be prepared before the beginning of Shabbat and then cooked overnight at a low temperature.

== Karachi haleem ==
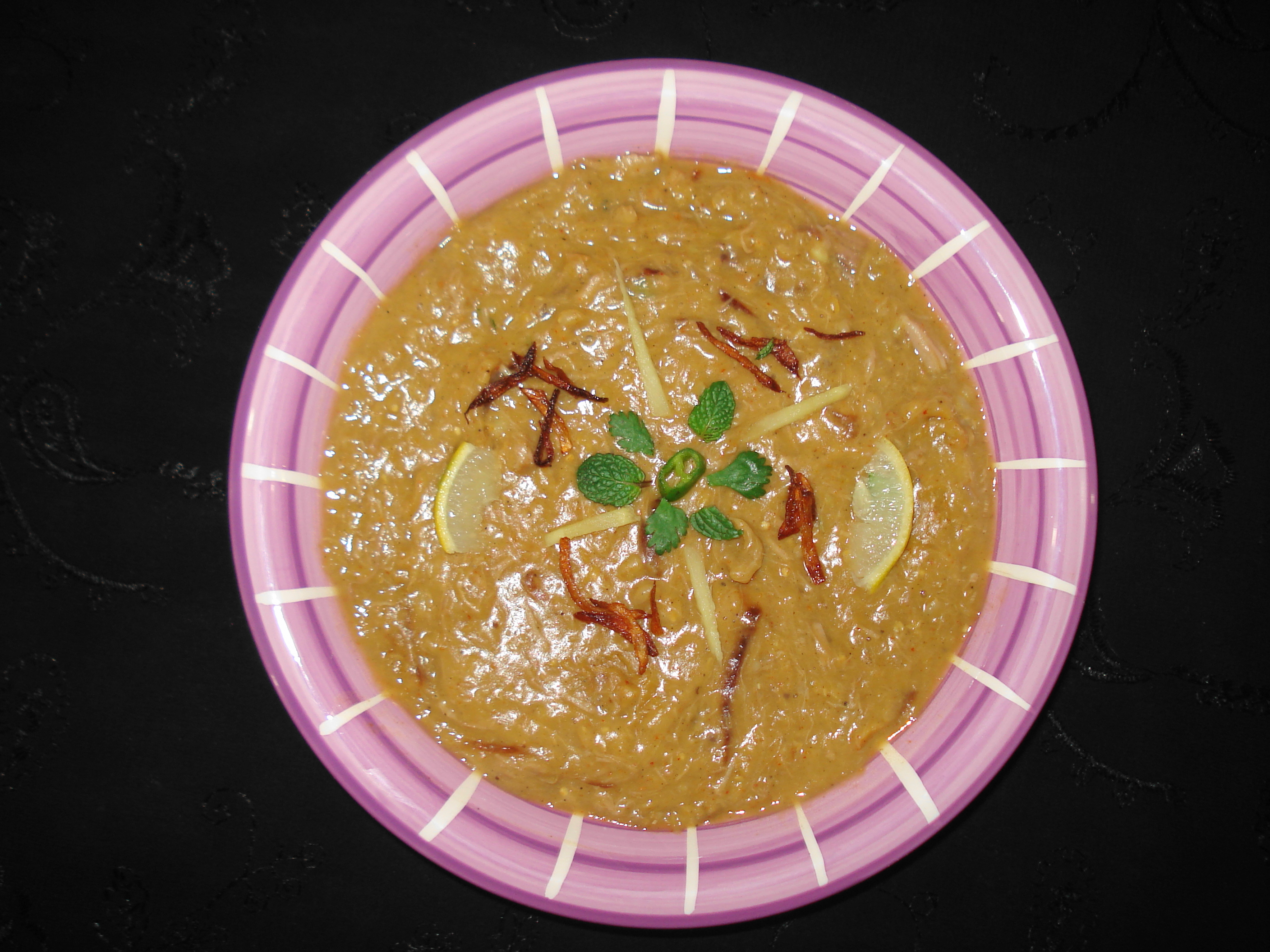
Karachi-style haleem shown in a purple plate

Karachi haleem is a variation of haleem, a slow-cooked dish made from wheat, lentils, and meat, commonly prepared in Pakistan and other parts of South Asia. Originating from Karachi, the largest city in Pakistan and the capital of Sindh province, this version is known for its smooth consistency and balanced use of spices. It is typically garnished with fried onions, lemon, ginger, and green chilies. Compared to other regional styles, Karachi haleem is often more finely blended and slightly spicier, reflecting local culinary preferences. Its popularity has grown both within Pakistan and among South Asian communities abroad, contributing to its recognition as a distinct regional variant of the dish.

== Hyderabadi haleem ==
Haleem has become a popular dish in the cities of Hyderabad, Telangana and Aurangabad, Maharashtra (Aurangabad, the first capital of Hyderabad State) in India. Originating from an Arabic dish called harees, Haleem was introduced to the region during the Mughal period by foreign migrants.

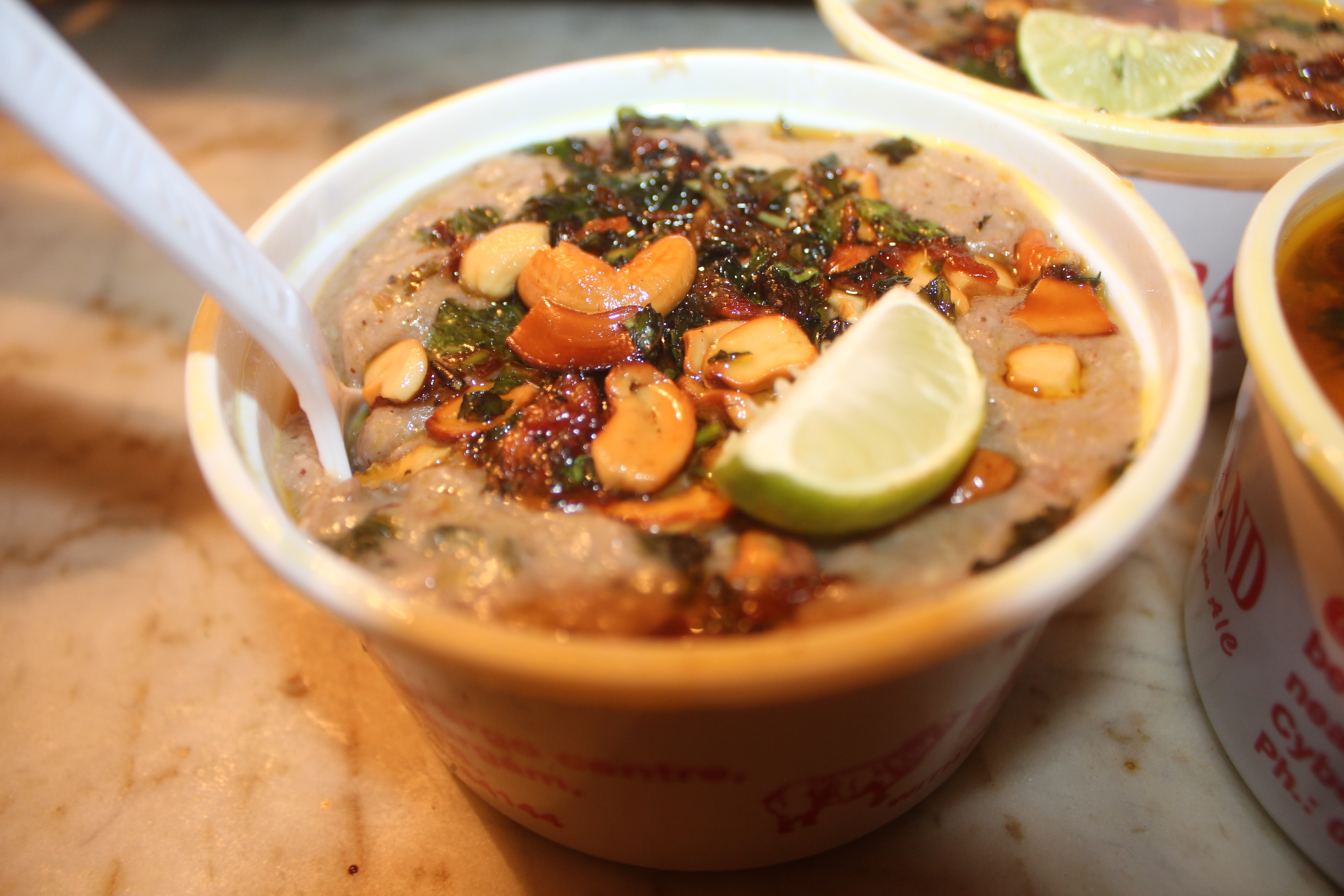
Hyderabadi haleem is usually thicker than many other haleems.

In 2010, Hyderabadi haleem was awarded Geographical Indication status by the Indian GI registry office. It became the first meat product of India to receive a GI certification. This means that a dish cannot be sold as Hyderabadi haleem unless it meets the necessary standards.

== Khichra ==
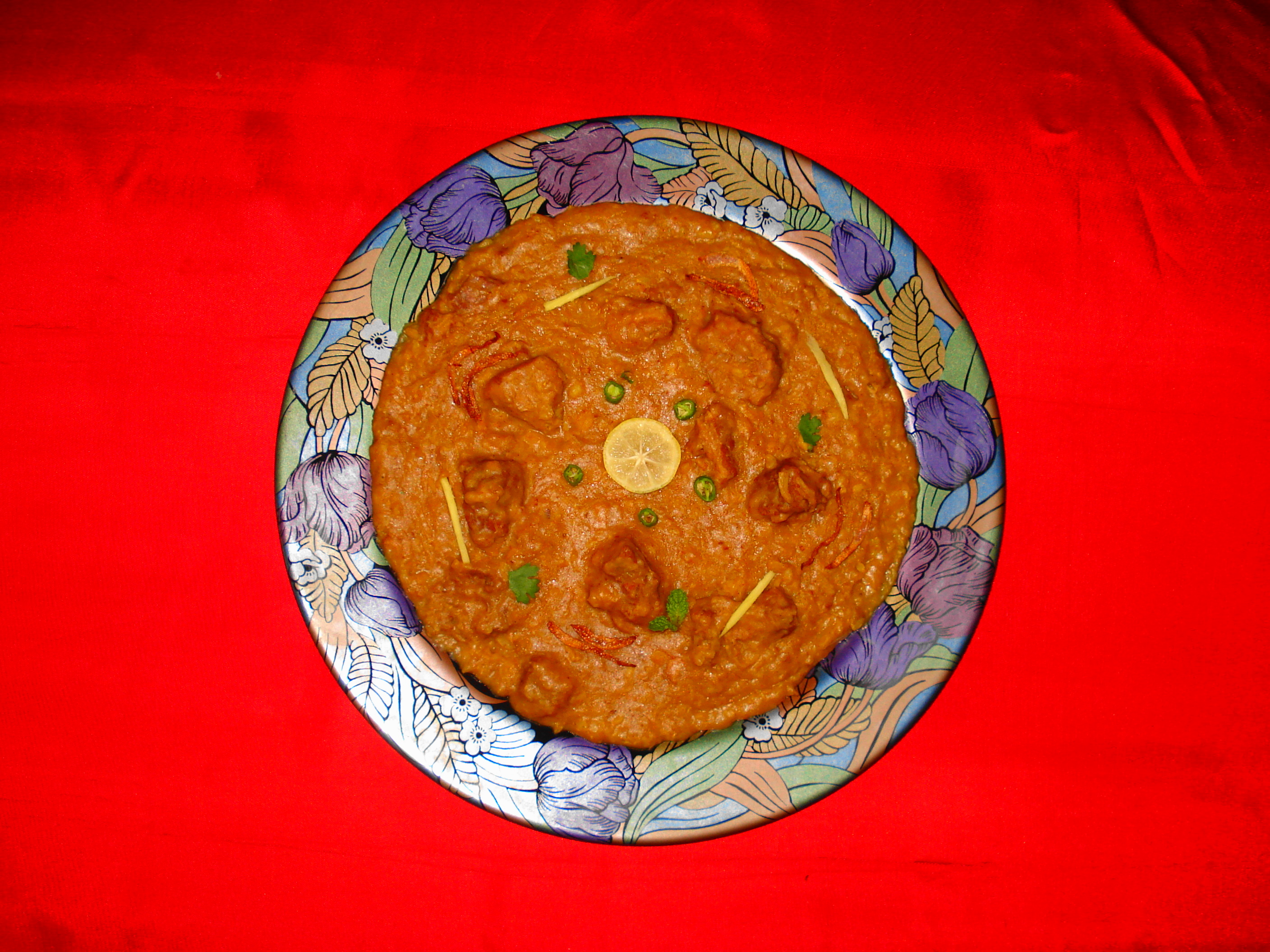
Khichra

In the Indian subcontinent, both haleem and khichra are made with similar ingredients. In khichra, the chunks of meat remain as cubes, while in haleem the meat cubes are taken out of the pot, bones are removed, the meat is crushed and put back in the pot. It is further cooked until the meat completely blends with the lentils, wheat and barley mixture.

== Nutrition ==
A high-calorie dish, haleem provides protein from the meat and fibre and carbohydrates from the various combinations of grains and pulses.

== Serving ==
Haleem can be served with chopped mint leaves, lemon juice, coriander leaves, fried onions, chopped ginger root or green chilies. In Iran and neighbouring countries, such as Uzbekistan, haleem is served with cinnamon and sugar. In some regions of Pakistan, Haleem is eaten with Naan or with any type of bread or rice.

== See also ==
- List of stews
- List of Pakistani soups and stews
