= Culture of Hyderabad =

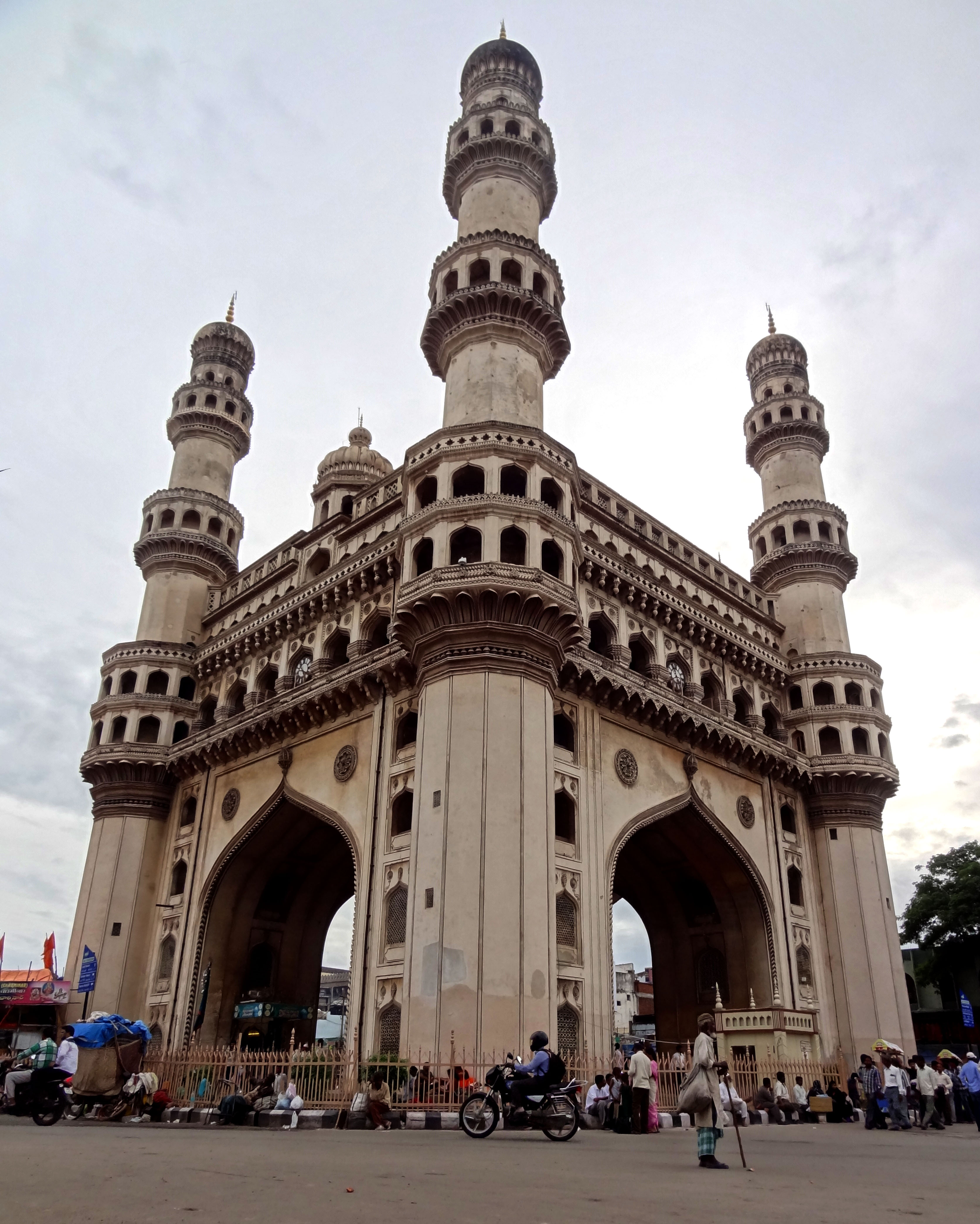
Charminar

The culture of Hyderabad, also known as Hyderabadi Tehzeeb (حیدرآبادي تہذیب ) or Dakhini Tehzeeb (دکني تہذیب ), is the traditional cultural lifestyle of the Hyderabadi Muslims, and characterizes distinct linguistic and cultural traditions of North and South India, which meet and mingle in the city and erstwhile kingdom. This blending was the result of the geographic location of the region and the variety of historical dynasties that ruled the city across different periods—its inception by the Qutub Shahi dynasty in 1591 AD, the occupation by the Mughal Empire and its decline, and the patronage under the Asaf Jahi dynasty.

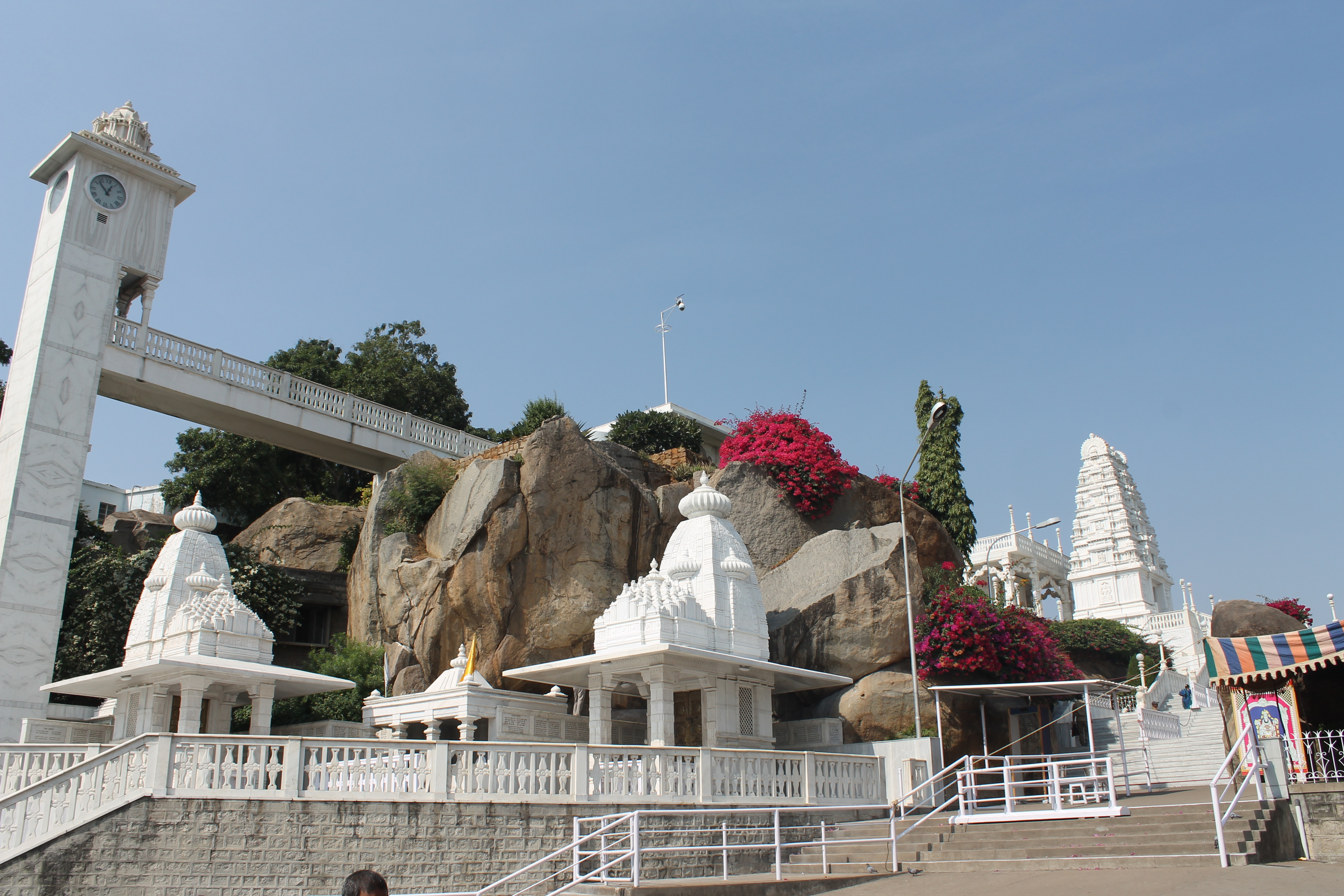
Birla Mandir Hyderabad

The city is historically known for its Ganga-Jamuni tehzeeb, which refers to unity and co-existence of Hindu and Muslim cultures and traditions. Apart from a few instances of communal violence, the majority of the city residents advocate communal harmony between Hyderabadi Muslims and Telugu people, the two main religious and cultural groups found in the city.

Apart from Hyderabad, Hyderabadi Culture is also seen in communities in Bidar, Vijayawada, Gulbarga, Bijapur, Guntur, Latur and Aurangabad. These used to be a part of the erstwhile Hyderabad State, hence, the culture is prevalent in the areas, especially among Dakhini Muslims.

Hyderabadis, as residents of the city are known, may be either Urdu or Telugu speaking. The traditional Hyderabadi garb is Sherwani Kurta Paijama, and Lungi for men, Sarees, Khara Dupatta and Salwar kameez for women. Burqa and Hijab is commonly practised among the Muslim women in public. Most of the youth wear western clothing. Public carnivals celebrated in Hyderabad include the, Ganesh Chaturthi, Bonalu, Eid ul-Fitr and Eid al-Adha, Milad Un Nabi

== The Capital ==
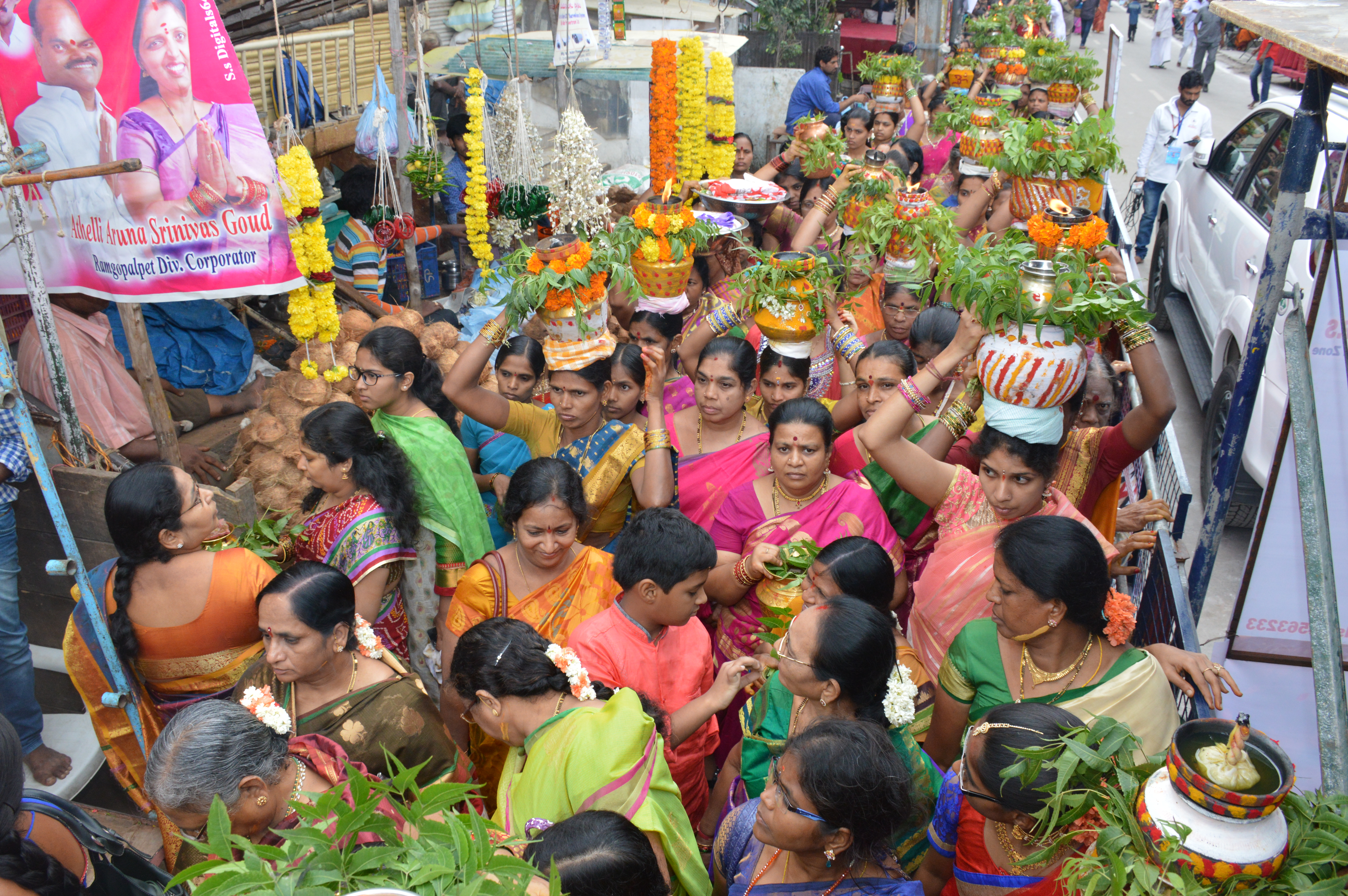
Bonalu celebrations in Hyderabad

Hyderabad city as the former capital of Hyderabad State had received the royal patronage for arts, literature and architecture by the former rulers, also attracting men of letters and arts from different parts of the world to get settled in the city. Such multi-ethnic settlements popularised multi cultural events such as Mushairas, literary and stage drama. Besides the popularity of Western and other Indian popular musics such as the filmi music, the residents of Hyderabad play city based Marfa Music which had become an integral part of every event. The Osmania University and University of Hyderabad offers Masters and Doctoral (PhD) level programs in classical languages, modern languages, dance, theatre arts, painting, fine art and communication. The Ravindra Bharati, Shilpakala Vedika and Lalithakala Thoranam are well-known auditoria for theatre and performing arts in the city. Another prominent cultural centre is Lamakaan, known for promoting the arts and regularly hosting a plethora of events and workshops.

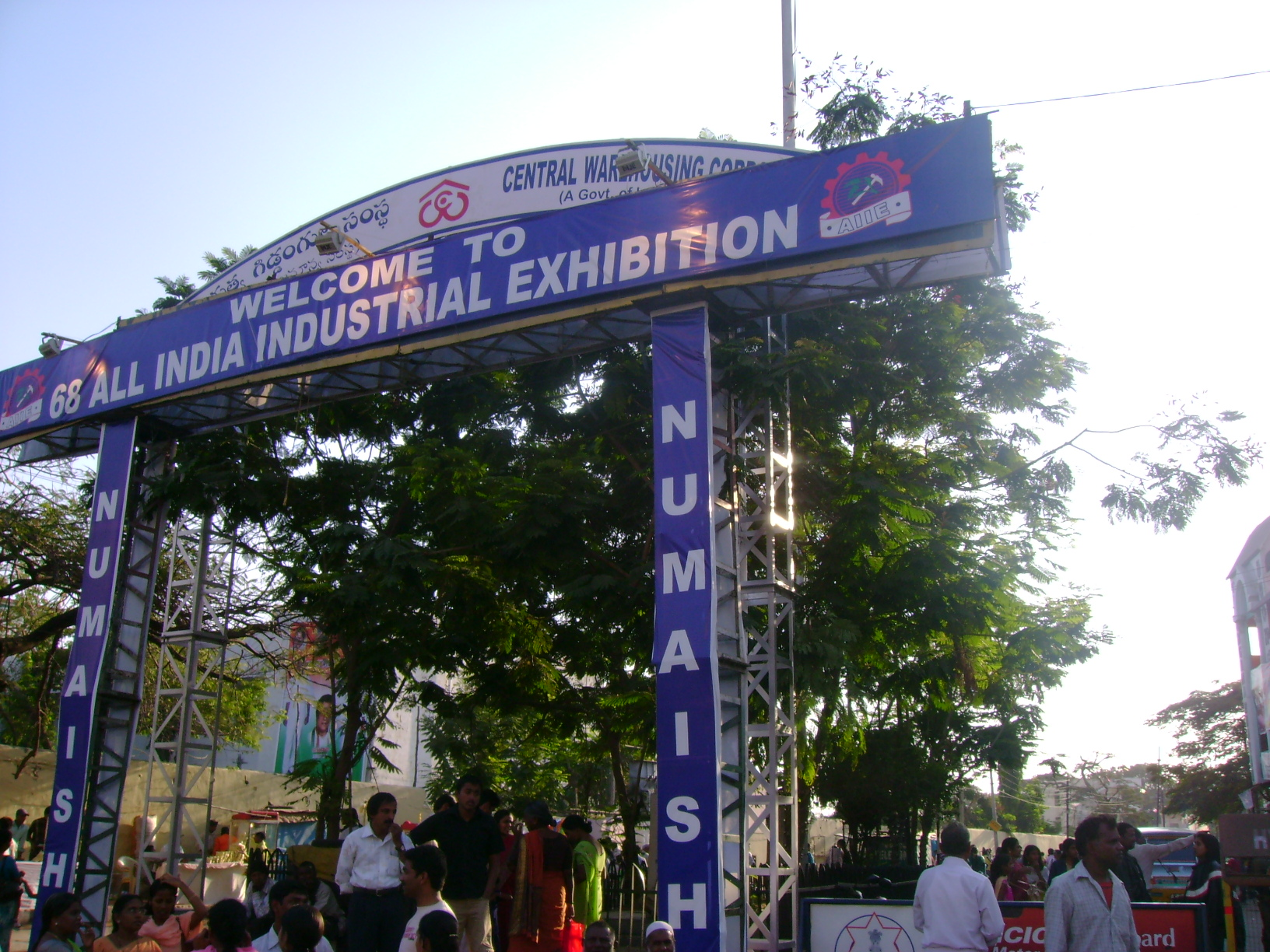
Numaish in Hyderabad

The modern Hyderabad International Convention Centre (HICC), also known as HITEX, constructed with the cost of ₹ 3 billion has become well known venue address internationally. The Hyderabad Literary Festival, held since 2010, is an annual event which showcases the city's literary and cultural aspects. In the year 2010, the first ever International Congress of Mathematicians was organised in the city. Other cultural events include annual Numaish and literary festival for promoting regional Indian literature. Some of the nationally and internationally acclaimed cultural representatives from the city are Sarojini Naidu, Amjad Hyderabadi, M F Hussain, Irshad Panjatan, Talat Aziz, Harsha Bhogle, Sharmila Tagore, Vithal Rao, Shaik Dawood Khan, Janardhan Mitta and Rashid Ali.

== Museums ==
Hyderabad is home to many museums, galleries, and other institutions which are major tourist attractions as well as playing a research role. The first of these to be established was the State Archaeology Museum (former name Hyderabad Museum) in 1930. The other important museums including, the Salar Jung Museum, the Nizam Museum, the City Museum, the Khazana Building Museum and the Birla Science Museum which also comprises a planetarium.

=== Salar Jung Museum ===
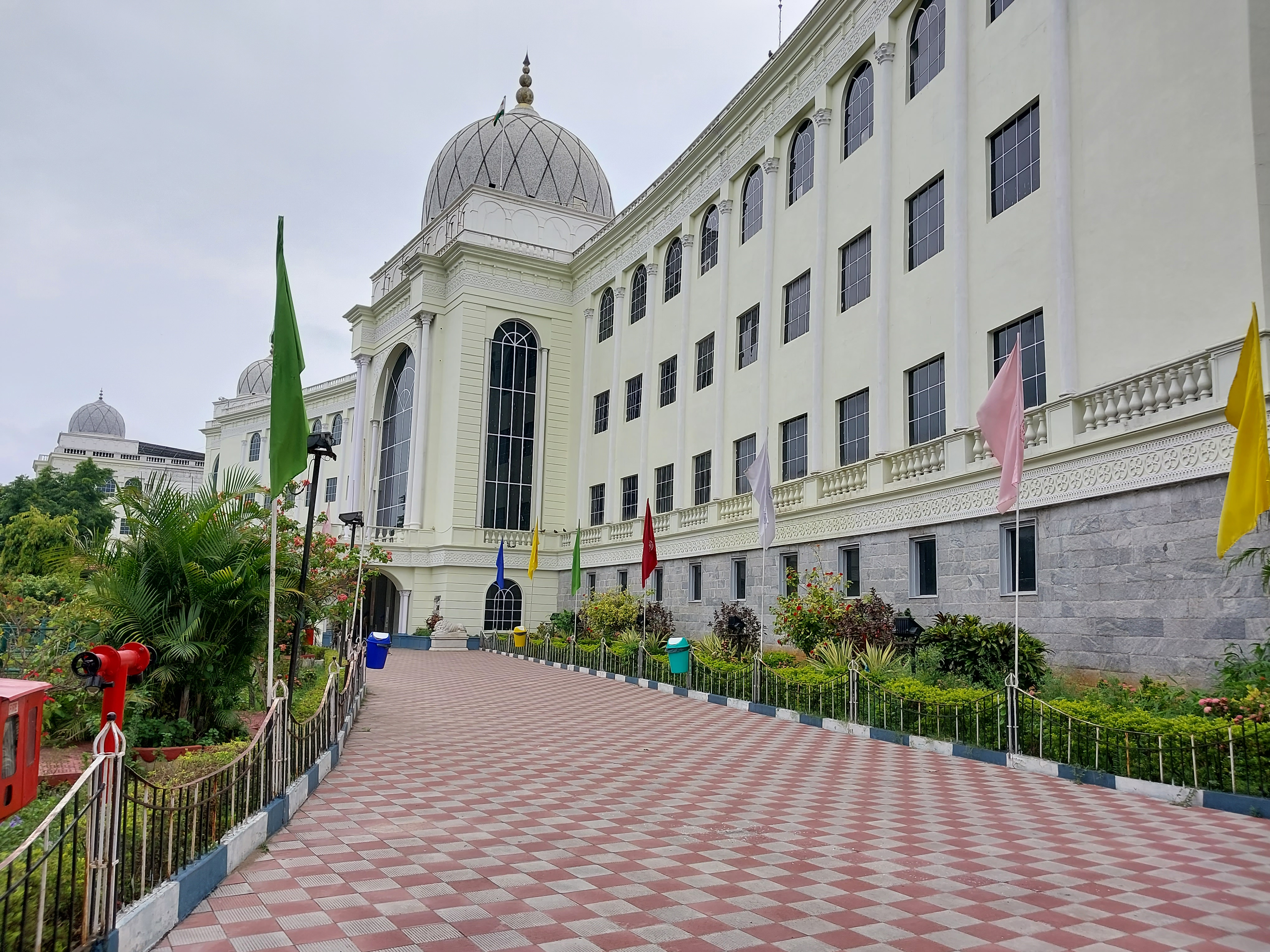
Salar Jung Museum

The Salar Jung Museum, which houses "The world's largest one-man collection", is by far the largest and most famous museum in the city. It is one of the three national museums of India. It houses an impressive collection of artifacts from all over the world, collected by Salar Jung III, who was the Prime Minister of Hyderabad. Among the most notable exhibits are jade-crafted daggers belonging to Jahangir and Shah Jahan, the famous sculpture of Veiled Rebecca and copies of the Quran in various styles and sizes.

=== The Nizam Museum ===
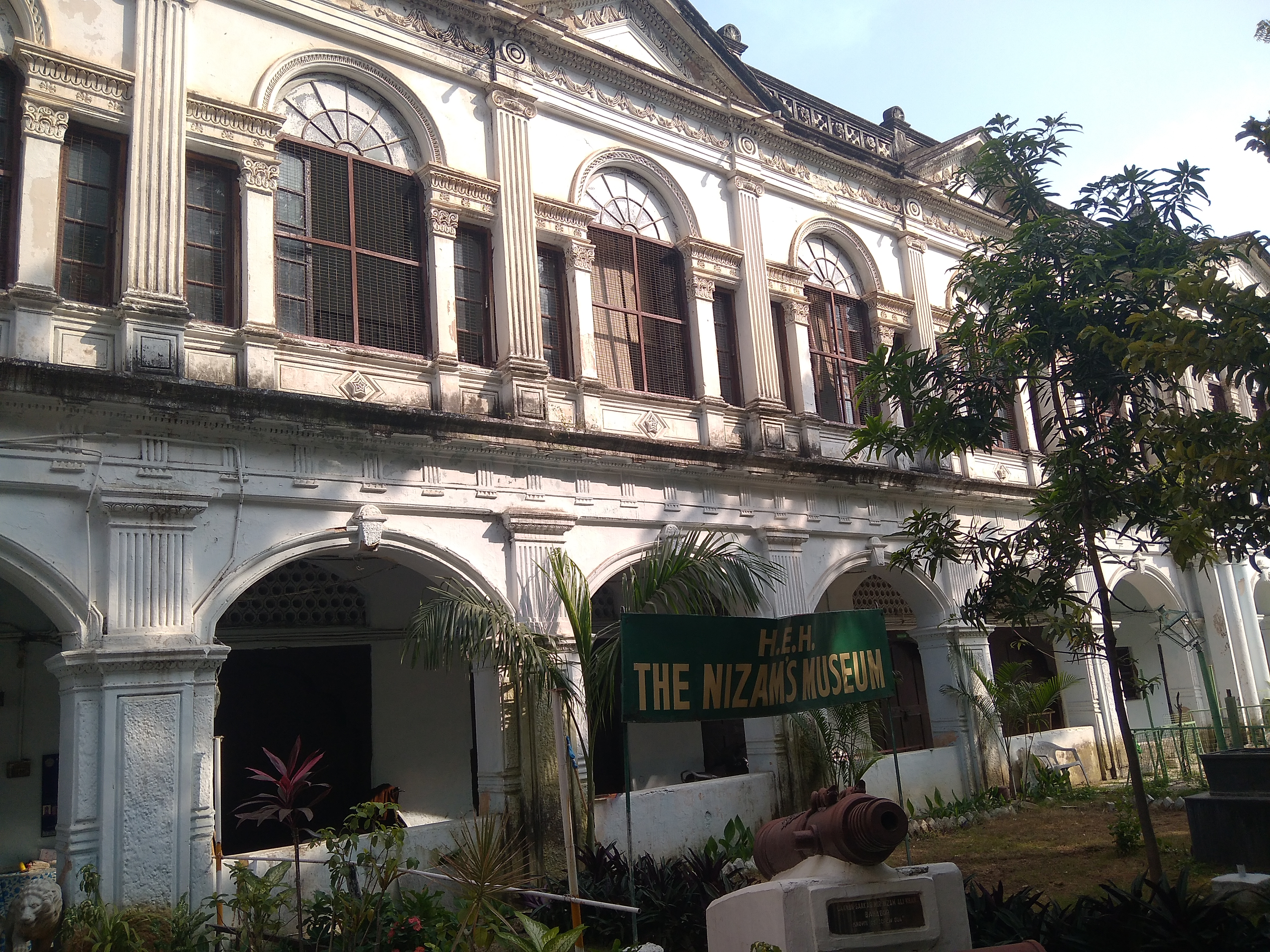
Nizam museum

The Nizam’s Museum, situated within the Purani Haveli complex in Hyderabad, Telangana, was established in 2000 to preserve and exhibit the heritage of the Asaf Jahi dynasty. The museum houses a diverse collection of artifacts that once belonged to the last Nizam of Hyderabad, Mir Osman Ali Khan. Its exhibits include a golden throne used during the Silver Jubilee celebrations of 1936, silver replicas of Hyderabad’s notable landmarks, vintage automobiles such as a 1930s Rolls-Royce, and a variety of personal gifts and memorabilia. The collection offers insight into the political, cultural, and artistic milieu of early twentieth-century Hyderabad and reflects the grandeur associated with the Nizam’s rule.

=== The City Museum ===
Located within the historic Purani Haveli complex, the City Museum offers a broader view of Hyderabad’s evolution, complementing the royal focus of the nearby Nizam’s Museum. Inaugurated in 2012, it traces the city’s history from prehistoric settlements and megalithic cultures to its development under the Qutb Shahi and Asaf Jahi dynasties. The museum’s collection includes Neolithic tools, Satavahana-era coins, terracotta figurines, and traditional textiles, each reflecting a different layer of the region’s cultural identity. Interactive exhibits, including multilingual digital kiosks, allow visitors to explore the stories of Hyderabad’s neighborhoods and communities. Together, the displays present a vivid narrative of how the city’s artistic, architectural, and social life has evolved across centuries.

=== The Khazana Building ===
The Khazana Building Museum, located near the historic Golconda Fort in Hyderabad, occupies a former royal treasury built in the 16th century under the reign of Ibrahim Qutb Shahi. The structure served as a fortress-like storage for the sultanate’s riches and later, following the transition of power in 1948, was repurposed by the Indian Army for salary distribution before being handed over to the heritage authorities. The museum’s collection includes cannons from the Qutb Shahi period, stone sculptures from the Chalukya and Kakatiya dynasties, rare coins and excavated relics spanning several centuries. While the building underwent restoration in 2016, the museum has faced periods of inaccessibility to the public due to security and maintenance issues, highlighting the ongoing challenges of preserving Hyderabadi heritage.

== Art ==
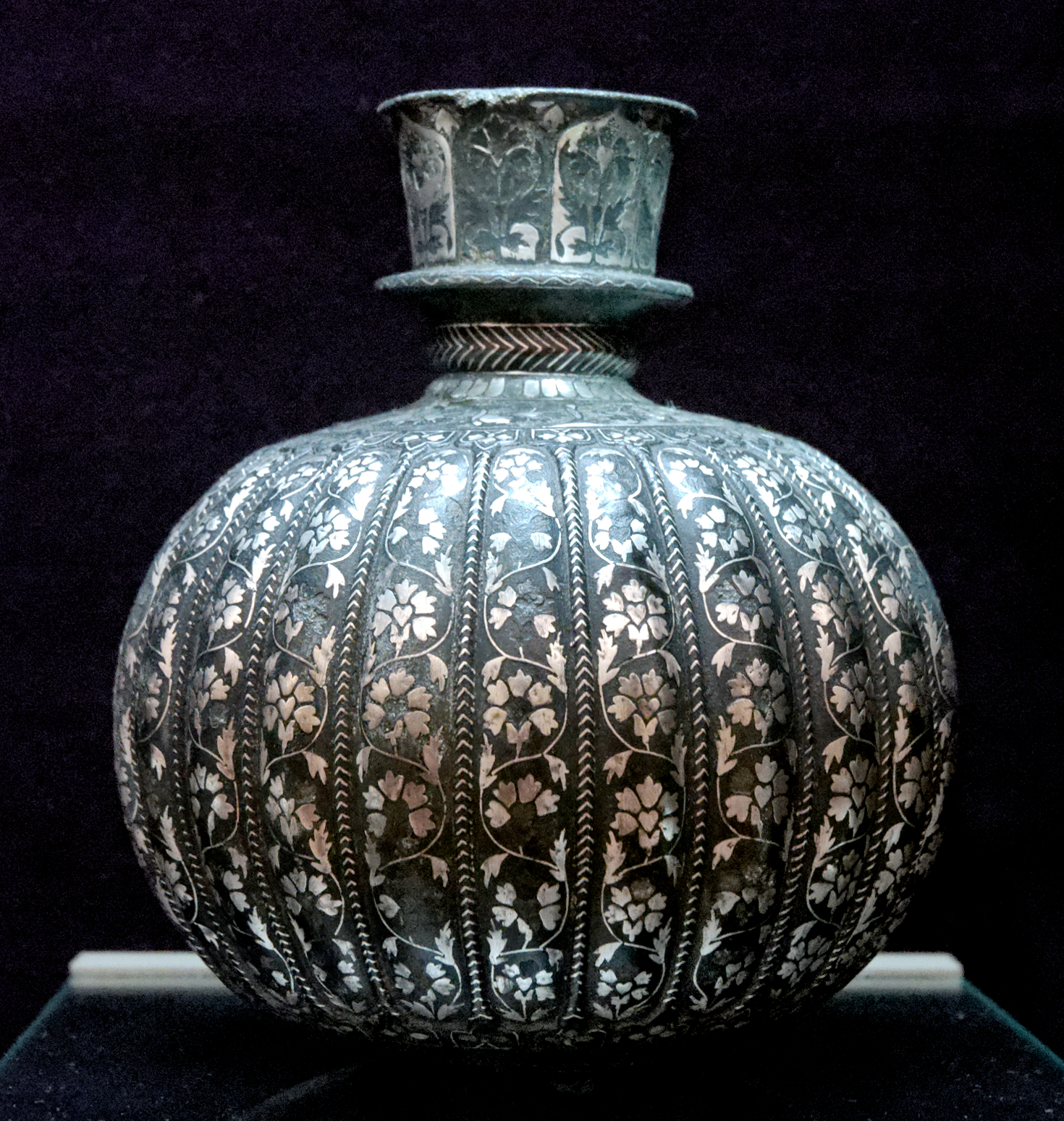
A Bidriware of the 18th century, displayed at Musée du Louvre

=== Painting ===
Deccani style painting originated in the 16th century in and around Hyderabad. It contains an insightful native style with the blend of foreign techniques and has a similarity of neighbouring Vijayanagara paintings. The extensive use of luminous, gold and white colours is generally found in Deccani paintings. Due to the Islamic influence in the sultanate the Deccani paintings are mostly of nature with the background of floral and fauna, and the major use of regional landscape is reflected commonly with regional culture. Some Deccani paintings present the historical events of the region.

=== Handicraft ===
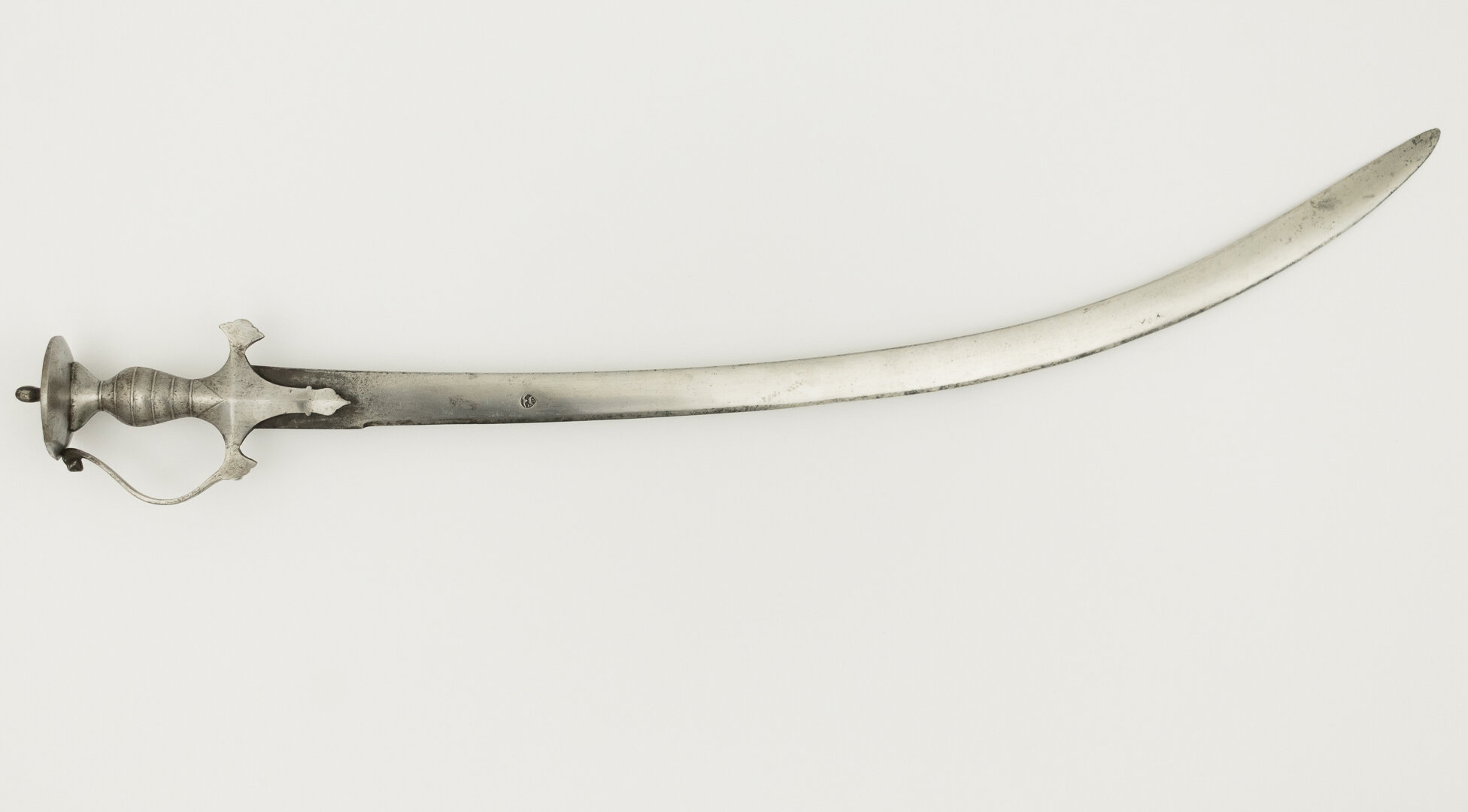
All Steel Deccani Sword, the Tulwar

A Fine art metal handicraft Bidri ware (the skills and techniques which came from Middle East to India during the 14th century), was popularised in Hyderabad during Asif Jahi region in the 18th century. Today the production of Bidriware in Hyderabad and neighbouring Bidar accounts highest in India. The Bidri ware is a Geographical Indication (GI) awarded craft of India. The Kalamkari, a fine art of Handicraft (originated in Machilipatnam 3000 year ago is a Handicraft of Andhra Pradesh) is also popular in the city.

== Literature ==
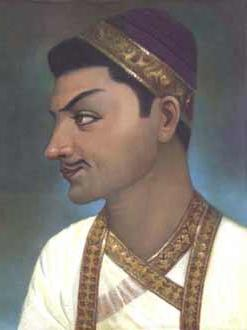
Muhammad Quli Qutb Shah, founder of Hyderabad and Urdu poet

The Qutb Shahs were regarded as the great patrons of Urdu, Farsi and Telugu language. The region saw a growth of Deccani Urdu literature, the Deccani Masnavi and Diwan composed during those periods are among the earliest available manuscripts in the Urdu language. The literary work of this region is influenced with the regional Marathi, Telugu, and Kannada in parallel with Arabic and Persian including the adoption of poetic meters and a great quantity of renovated words. The Fifth Sultan of the dynasty, Mohammed Quli Qutb Shah was himself an Urdu poet.

The period of Nizams saw a growth of literary growth since after printing was introduced in Hyderabad. In 1824 AD, the first collection of Urdu Ghazals named Gulzar-e-Mahlaqa (Mahlaqa's garden of flowers) written by Mah Laqa Bai, was printed and published from Hyderabad.

After the Revolt of 1857, many Urdu writers, scholars and poets who lost their patronage at Delhi made Hyderabad their home, that grew and brought reforms in the literary and poetry work. Scholars continued to migrate to Hyderabad during the reign of Asaf Jah VI and his successor Asaf Jah VII. These included Shibli Nomani, Dagh Dehlvi, Fani Badayuni, Josh Malihabadi, Ali Haider Tabatabai, Zahir Dehlvi and many others.

The reign of Asaf Jah VII saw many reforms in literary work. For the first time in history the Nizams introduced Urdu as a language of court, administration and education. Other notable poets, scholars and writers of the early 20th century are Amjad Hyderabadi, Maharaja Sir Kishen Pershad, Makhdoom Mohiuddin, Sayyid Shamsullah Qadri, Mohiuddin Qadri Zore and Sulaiman Areeb.

Sarojini Naidu, born and brought up in Hyderabad, was a great admirer of Hyderabadi culture. She described its various aspects in her poems, the most famous of which is "In the Bazaars of Hyderabad".

Since after Indian Independence, the organisation that are working for the development of the literary work are Sahitya Akademi (to promote both Telugu and Urdu in Telangana), Urdu Academy, Telugu Academy, National Council for Promotion of Urdu Language, The Comparative Literature Association of India and Andhra Saraswata Parishad (Former name; Nizam Rashtria Andhra Saraswata Parishad). Along with native languages the city attracts many international languages scholars since after the establishment of English and Foreign Languages University (1972). The State Central Library, Hyderabad (former name Asifia Kutubkhana) since 1891 is the biggest library of Telangana. The other popular libraries in the city are the Sri Krishna Devaraya Andhra Bhasha Nilayam, the British Library and the Sundarayya Vignana Kendram which also houses Urdu research center's collection.

In 2017, Urdu was declared the second official language of the state of Telangana. (after Telugu) This move was praised by many residents of the area, especially Muslims of Hyderabad who spoke Urdu as their mother tongue.

== Dance, Theatre and Music ==
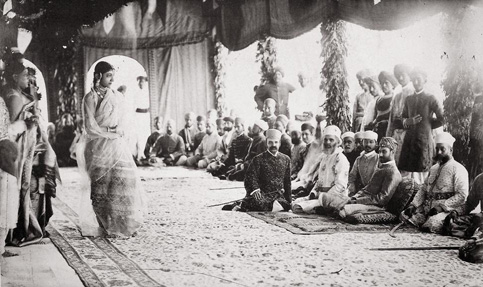
Mushaira by courtesans in Hyderabad

Since inception of Hyderabad, the nobles have a tradition of courtesans dance and poetry, which had led to a unique style of dance form in court dance in Hyderabad, the Taramati of the early 16th century and Mah Laqa Bai 18th century are some of the early courtesans who popularised Kathak dance and poetry culture in the early history of Hyderabad. Some of the dance festivals organised by the AP Government are; Golconda Music and Dance Festival, The Taramati Music Festival, The Premavathi Dance Festival.

The residents of Hyderabad, in the past were not much trendy in theatre and drama, though artists like Baban Khan had been internationally recognized for their theatrical work. It was in the last few decades that the Department of Culture and the Theatre Development Department of Andhra Pradesh Government had applied efforts to promote the art of theatre with multiple programs and festivals. The result of which that most of the youths have been evolved in the theatre art and drama and it is gaining popularity among the residents.

=== Music ===
The city is home to many Qawwals, that keep the age-old tradition of Qawwali intact, the most notable of which are Ateeq Hussain Khan and the Warsi Brothers. The tradition is kept alive at various Dargahs in the city, including Dargah Yousufain, Dargah-e-Hazrat Shah Khamosh and Dargah Pahadi Shareef.

== Film and Media ==
Film-making in Hyderabad was started in early 1917 by Lotus film Co during the Nizams era. The city is home to the Telugu film industry, popularly known as Tollywood, the second largest in India after Bollywood. Since 2005, parallel to Tollywood and Bollywood the city base Hyderabad lingo movies initiated by "Hyderabad Deccan Film Club" called "Dollywood", has gained popularity in the region. Annually the city host, "International Children Film Festival", and since 2007, the city has hosted the Hyderabad International Film Festival (HIFF), The Prasad Multiplex houses the world's largest IMAX-3D, In the year 2005, the Guinness World Records declared, The Ramoji Film City located in Hyderabad since 1996, as the world's largest film studio. Hyderabad also serves as a recurring backdrop in Bollywood films that depict Hyderabadi culture and architecture, including Meenaxi: A Tale of Three Cities(2004) Hyderabad Blues (1998), and Daawat-e-Ishq (2014), each reflecting elements of Hyderabadi Urdu, cuisine, and the city’s cosmopolitan identity. Alongside these, the Deccani (Hyderabadi‑language) film industry, sometimes referred to as “Dollywood,” has produced popular films such as The Angrez (2005), Hyderabad Nawabs (2006), and FM (Fun Aur Masti) (2007), which showcase the city’s unique dialect, humor, and street culture, highlighting the vibrancy of local cinema parallel to mainstream Bollywood.

In the digital age, social media influencers and comedians such as Mohd. Danish, Adnan Sajid Khan (Gullu Dada), Mohammed Iqbal Malik, and Warangal Diaries have popularized Hyderabadi Urdu and humor on platforms like YouTube, Instagram, and TikTok, reaching global audiences and reinforcing the city’s cultural identity through satire and storytelling. Through cinema and online media alike, Hyderabad continues to project its linguistic diversity, humor, and historical charm to a wider audience, blending tradition with modern creative expression. In addition to cinema, Hyderabad’s media landscape is shaped by its news and digital platforms such as The Siasat Daily, founded in 1949, is an Urdu-language newspaper that provides coverage of local, regional, and national issues, while documenting the city’s cultural and civic life .It enjoys a strong following among Urdu‑speaking readers in Telangana and Andhra Pradesh, maintaining a circulation of roughly 50,000 copies per day and drawing a digital audience of millions of page‑views per month. Its print and digital editions, include an e-paper and social media channels, which serve the Urdu-speaking community and have begun spreading to a wider audience across India.

== Clothing, Jewelry and Perfume ==
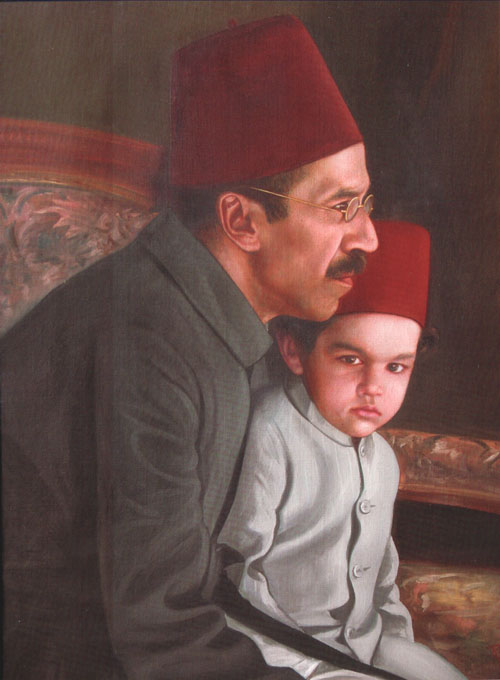
Asaf Jah VII and his heir apparent Mukarram Jah, both wearing Sherwani and Rumi Topi

=== Khara Dupatta ===
The Khara dupatta or Khada Dupatta (uncut veil) is an outfit composed of a kurta (tunic), chooridaar (ruched pair of pants), and 6-yard dupatta (veil) and is traditionally worn by Hyderabadi brides. Sometimes the kurta is sleeveless and worn over a koti resembling a choli. The bride also wears a matching ghoonghat (veil) over her head. The accompanying jewelry is:

- Tika (a medallion of uncut diamonds worn on the forehead and suspended by a string of pearls)
- Jhoomar (a fan-shaped ornament worn on the side of the head)
- Nath (a nose ring with a large ruby bead flanked by two pearls)
- Chintaak also known as Jadaoo Zevar (a choker studded with uncut diamonds and precious stones)
- Kan phool (earrings that match the Chintaak and consist of a flower motif covering the ear lobe and a bell-shaped ornament that is suspended from the flower. The weight of precious stones and gold in the Karan phool is held up by sahare or supports made of strands of pearls that are fastened into the wearer's hair.)
- Satlada (neck ornament of seven strands of pearls set with emeralds, diamonds and rubies)
- Ranihaar (neck ornament of pearls with a wide pendant)
- Jugni (neck ornament of several strands of pearls with a central pendant)
- Gote (Shellac bangles studded with rhinestones and worn with gold coloured glass bangles called sonabai)
- Payal (ankle bracelets)
- Gintiyan (toe rings)

=== Sherwani ===
The Sherwani is the traditional men's garb of Hyderabad. It is a coat-like tunic with a tight-fitting collar (hook & eyelet fastening), close-fitting in the upper torso and flaring somewhat in its lower half. It usually has six or seven buttons, often removable ones made from gold sovereigns for special occasions. The material is usually silk or wool. A groom may use gold brocade for his wedding sherwani, but otherwise good taste dictates understated colors, albeit with rich and textured fabrics. The sherwani is usually worn over a silk or cotton kurta (long shirt) and pyjamas (baggy pants with a drawstring at the waist).

The Sherwani is closely associated with Hyderabad, although it has spread since to the rest of India and to Pakistan. Prime Minister Jawaharlal Nehru adapted its design and turned it into his trademark Nehru Jacket, further popularizing the garment.

=== Attar ===
The traditional Attar, though considered a dying art form, are available in the bazaars near Charminar and the Moazzam Jahi Market. Many of the older generations still prefer attar over modern perfumes.

== Cuisines ==
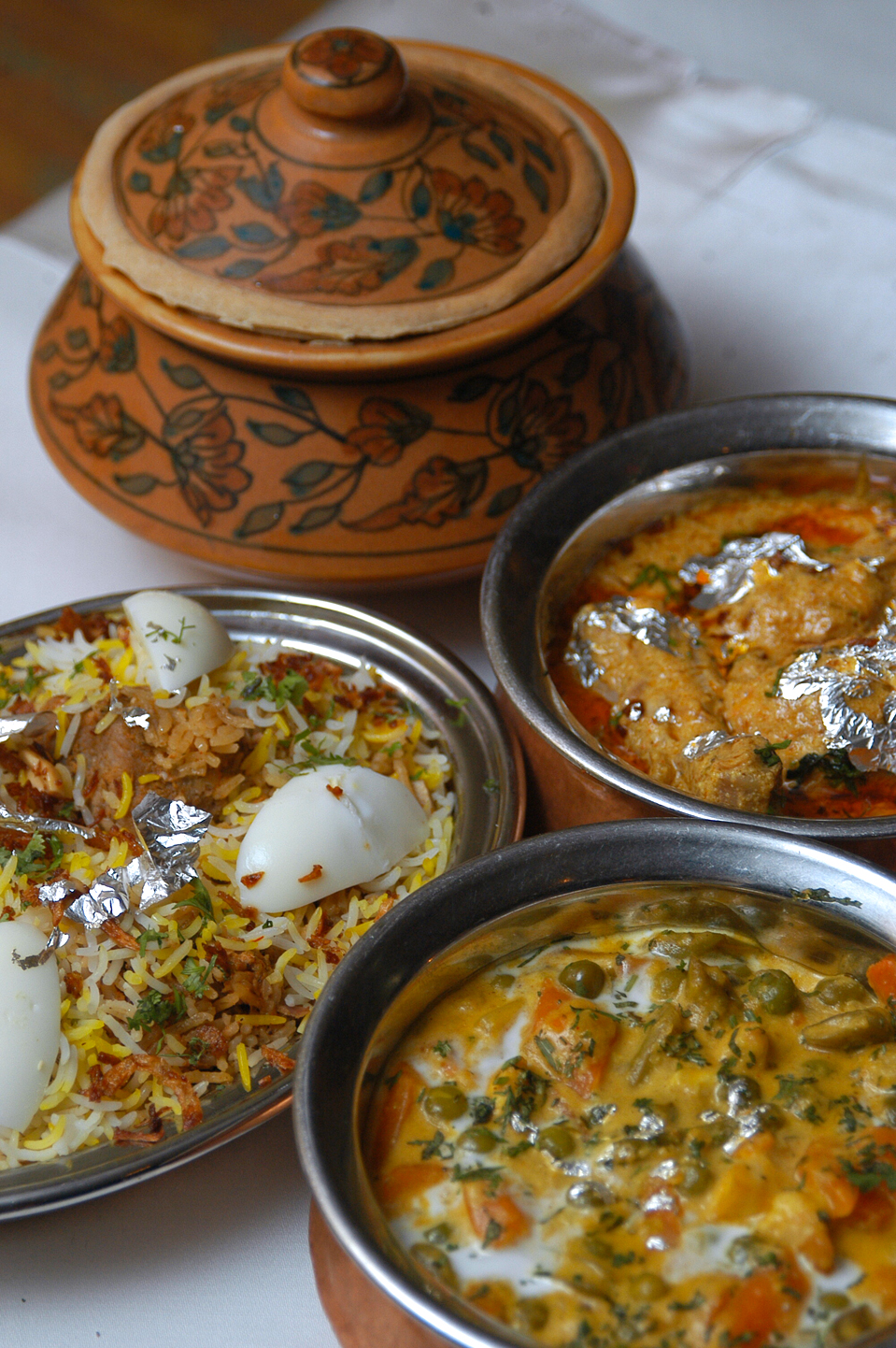
Hyderabadi biryani along with other Hyderabadi cuisine

The city is home to two types of cuisines, the Telugu cuisine and the Hyderabadi cuisine. The former is the native cuisine of the Telugu people and is influenced by South Indian cuisines while the latter is native to the Hyderabadi Muslims and is more influenced by Mughlai cuisines.

Hyderabadi cuisine is the traditional cuisine of the Hyderabadi Muslims, originating during the Qutb Shahi and Asaf Jahi periods. It consists of various wheat and rice dishes, often cooked with meat, or paired with meat curries. It is heavily influenced by Mughlai, Persian and Arab, as well as the local Telugu and Marathwada cuisines.

Some of the most famous dishes include Hyderabadi Biryani, a celebration of basmati rice, mutton, onions, yoghurt and various spices. It's beef variant called Kalyani Biryani is also popular in the city. Hyderabadi Haleem, a stew of wheat, lentils and mutton, is also another specialty of the city, originating from the Arab dish Harees. It is usually prepared during the month of Ramadan. Both of these carry Geographical Indication (GI) tags. Others include Hyderabadi Marag, Pathar-ka-Gosht, Maghz Masala, Khatti Dal, Gil-e-Firdaus, Lukhmi and Hyderabadi Khichdi. Irani Chai is enjoyed all over the city, often with Osmania Biscuits.

Desserts include Qubani-ka-Meetha, an apricot pudding, Shahi Tukra (also known as Double-ka-Meetha), a bread based dish and Gil-e-Firdaus, the local variant of Kheer.

Telugu cuisine is the part of South Indian cuisine characterized by their highly spicy food. The Telangana state lies on the Deccan plateau and its topography dictates more millet and roti (leavened bread) based dishes. Jowar and Bajra features more prominently in their cuisine. Due to its proximity with Maharashtra, Chhattisgarh and northwest Karnataka, it shares some similarities of the Deccan plateau cuisine. The region has the spiciest food amongst all other Telugu and Indian cuisines. Telangana has some unique dishes in its cuisine, such as jonna rotte (sorghum), sajja rotte (penisetum), or Uppudi Pindi (broken rice). In Telangana a gravy or curry is called Koora and Pulusu (Sour) in based on Tamarind. A deep fry reduction of the same is called Vepudu. Kodi pulusu and Mamsam (meat) vepudu are popular dishes in meat. Vankaya Brinjal Pulusu or Vepudu, Aritikaya Banana pulusu or Vepudu are one of the many varieties of vegetable dishes. Telangana palakoora is a spinach dish cooked with lentils eaten with steamed rice and rotis. Peanuts are added as special attraction and in Karimnagar District, cashew nuts are added.

Sakinalu also called as Chakinalu, is one of the most popular savory in Telangana, is often cooked during Makara Sankranti festival season. This a deep-fried snack made of rice flour, sesame seeds and flavoured with ajwain (carom seeds or vaamu in Telugu). These savories are harder and spicier than the Andhra varieties. Garijelu is a dumpling dish similar to the Maharashtrian karanji, which in Telangana is cooked with sweet stuffing or a savory stuffing with mutton or chicken kheema.

== Architecture ==
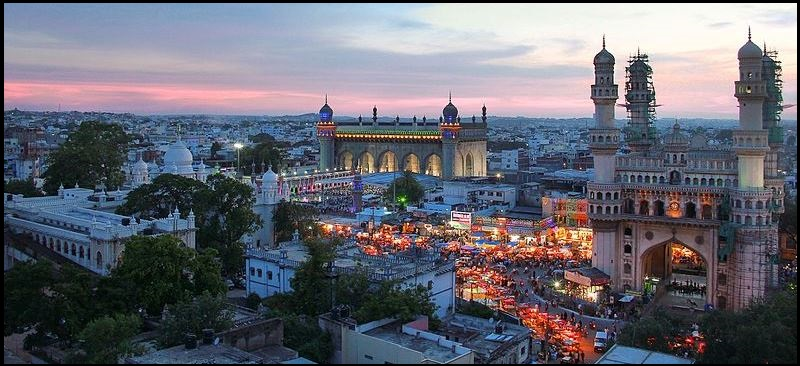
Panorama of Charminar complex, showing the Charminar, Mecca Masjid and Nizamia Hospital

A distinct Indo-Islamic architecture style with local contribution is reflected in the historical buildings of Hyderabad, making it the first and "Best Heritage City of India" as of March 2012. The city houses many famous historical sites constructed during Qutb Shahi and Asaf Jahi period, including various mosques and palaces.

Hindu Temple Architecture is also seen in the temples of Hyderabad, including the Birla Mandir, Jagannath Temple and Karmanghat Hanuman Temple. Modern architectural styles are seen in most buildings constructed after independence.

=== Qutb Shahi period ===
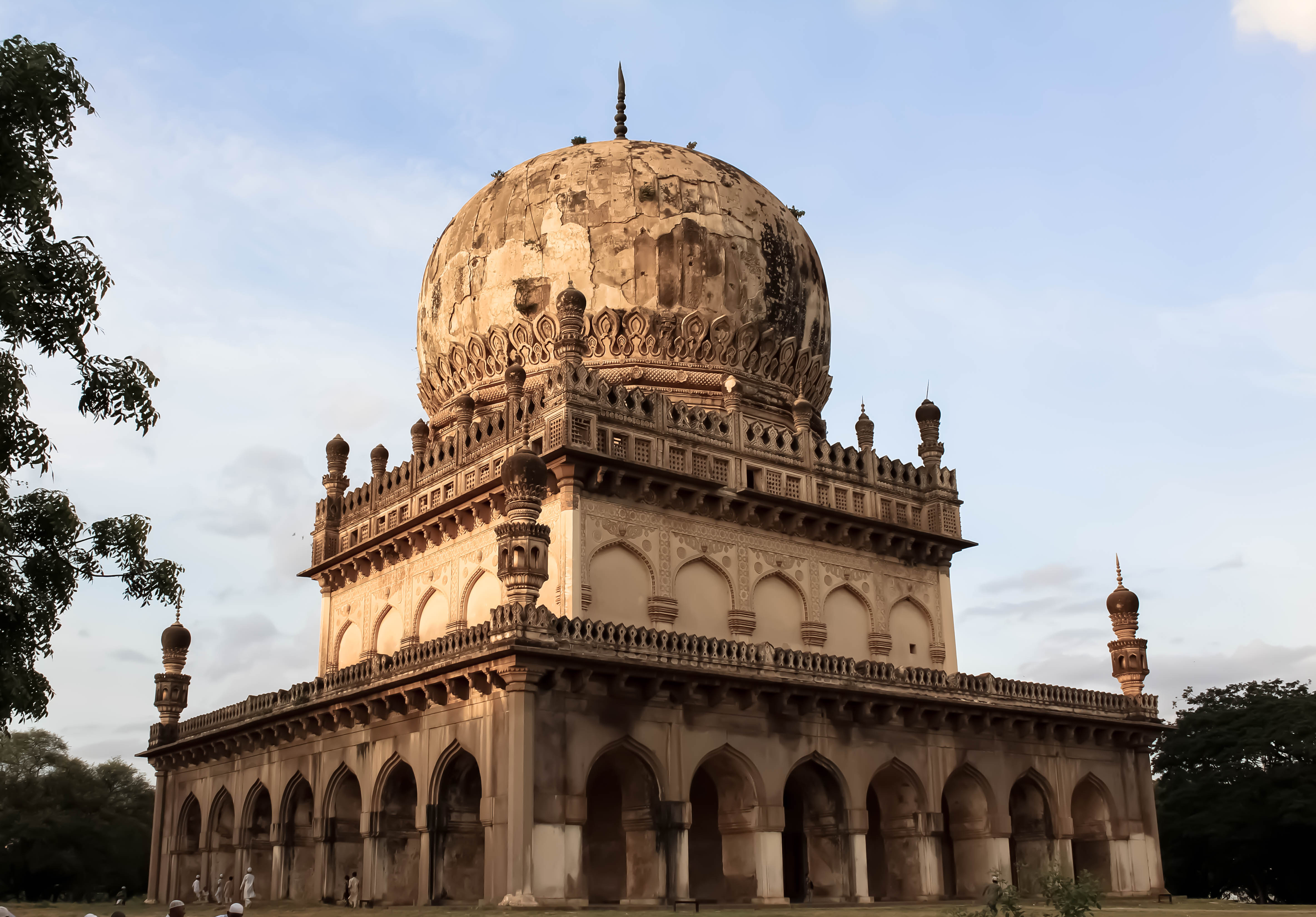
One of the Qutb Shahi Tombs

Qutb Shahi architecture of the 16th and early 17th centuries followed classical Persian architecture featuring domes and colossal arches. The oldest surviving Qutb Shahi structure in Hyderabad is the ruins of Golconda fort built in the 16th century.

The most important monuments from this time are the Charminar and Mecca Masjid, both built by Mohammed Quli Qutb Shah, the founder of Hyderabad. Most of the historical bazaars that still exist were constructed on the street north of Charminar towards the fort. The Charminar has become an icon of the city, located in the centre of old Hyderabad. It is a square structure with sides 20 m (66 ft) long and four grand arches each facing a road. At each corner stands a 56 m (184 ft)-high minaret. The Charminar, Golconda Fort and the Qutb Shahi tombs are considered to be monuments of national importance in India. In 2010, the Indian government proposed that the sites be listed for UNESCO World Heritage status.

The style is also seen in the Qutb Shahi Tombs, Taramati Baradari, Khairtabad Mosque and Toli Masjid.

=== Asaf Jahi period ===
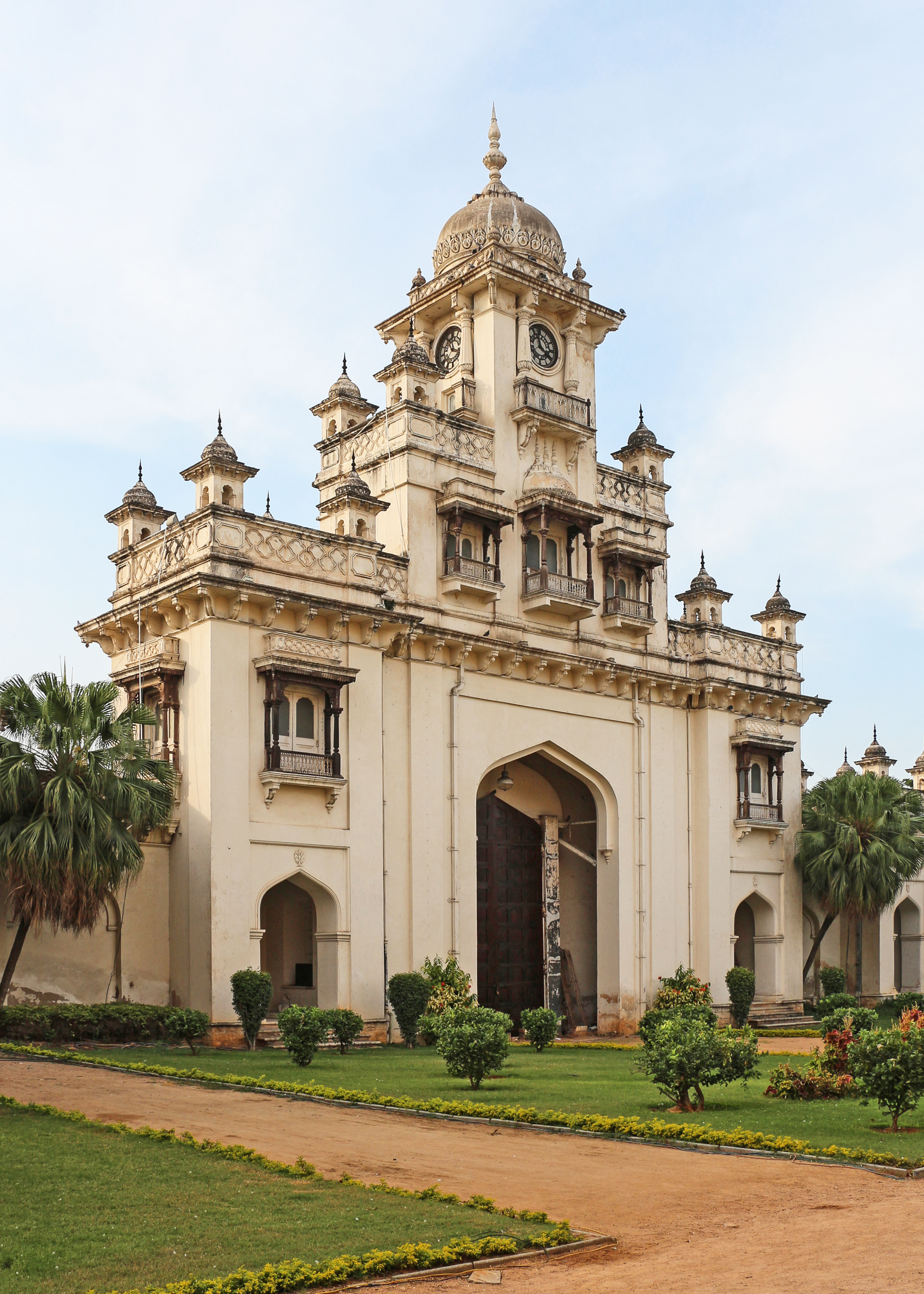
Gate of Chowmahalla Palace, the seat of the Nizam of Hyderabad

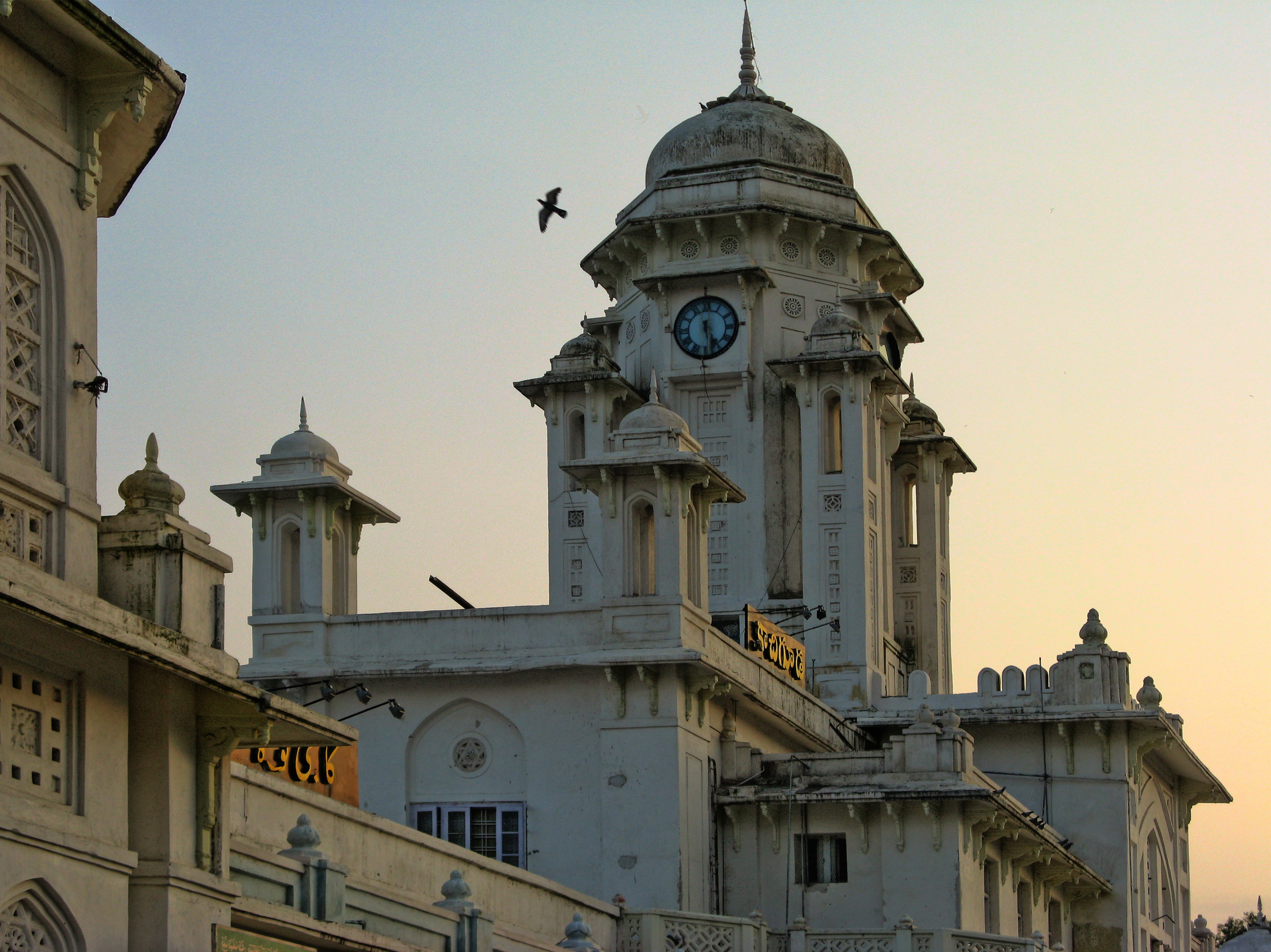
Kacheguda Railway Station, designed by Vincent Esch is an example of Indo-Saracenic Revival Architecture

In the 17th century, Asaf Jahi architecture emerged with palatial style outweighed secular construction. The earliest examples include the Purani Haveli, which served as the seat of the Nizam until the Chowmahalla Palace was constructed. The Chowmahalla Palace, located a stone's throw away from Charminar was constructed over a period of 100 years. It was recently restored and opened to the public.

Another testament to the wealth of Hyderabadi aristocracy is the Falaknuma Palace, built by Sir Vicar-ul-Umra and presented to Mir Mahbub Ali Khan, Asaf Jah VI. It was inspired by Andrea Palladio's villas. The Nizams applied European styles in some of the palaces such as Falaknuma and King Kothi Palaces.

Mir Osman Ali Khan, Asaf Jah VII is called as the maker of modern Hyderabad. The buildings constructed during his reign are impressive and represent a rich style of Indo-Saracenic architecture, such as the Osmania University, Moazzam Jahi Market, Hyderabad High Court, Osmania General Hospital, City College and Kachiguda Railway Station. These buildings are quite distinct from their earlier Qutb Shahi counterparts. Most of these were designed by British-Indian architect Vincent Esch.

The Spanish Mosque, Asman Garh Palace, Errum Manzil, Khursheed Jah Devdi, Mahbub Mansion, Saidani Ma Tomb, Aza Khana-e-Zohra, Hill Fort Palace, Nizamia Hospital, Bashir Bagh Palace (demolished) and Paigah Palace also contribute to the architecture of this period.

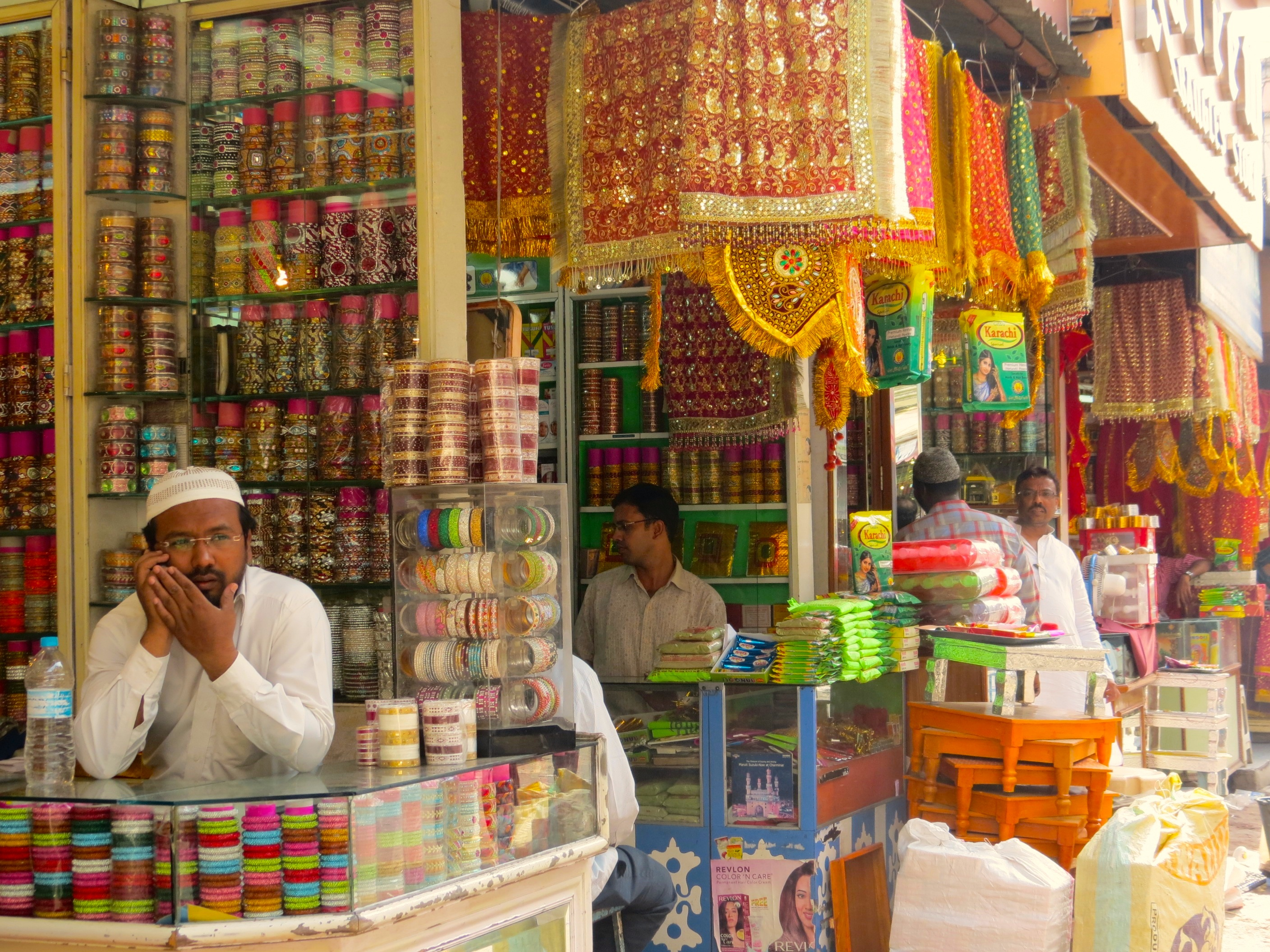
Shops in the Laad Bazaar

== Bazaars ==
Bazaars of Hyderabad form an integral part of the charm and add to the rich culture of the city. They are described in the poem "In the Bazaars of Hyderabad" by Sarojini Naidu. The Old City boasts of a large number of traditional Bazaars.

The Laad Bazaar adjacent to the historic Charminar is famous for its artificial bangles, pearls, jewelry, semi-precious stones, as well as Bidriware. Chatta Bazaar is famous for its Urdu Calligraphy wedding invitation cards, which are indispensable for every Hyderabadi Muslim wedding. Other bazaars include Begum Bazaar, Sultan Bazaar and the Moazzam Jahi Market.

== Sport ==
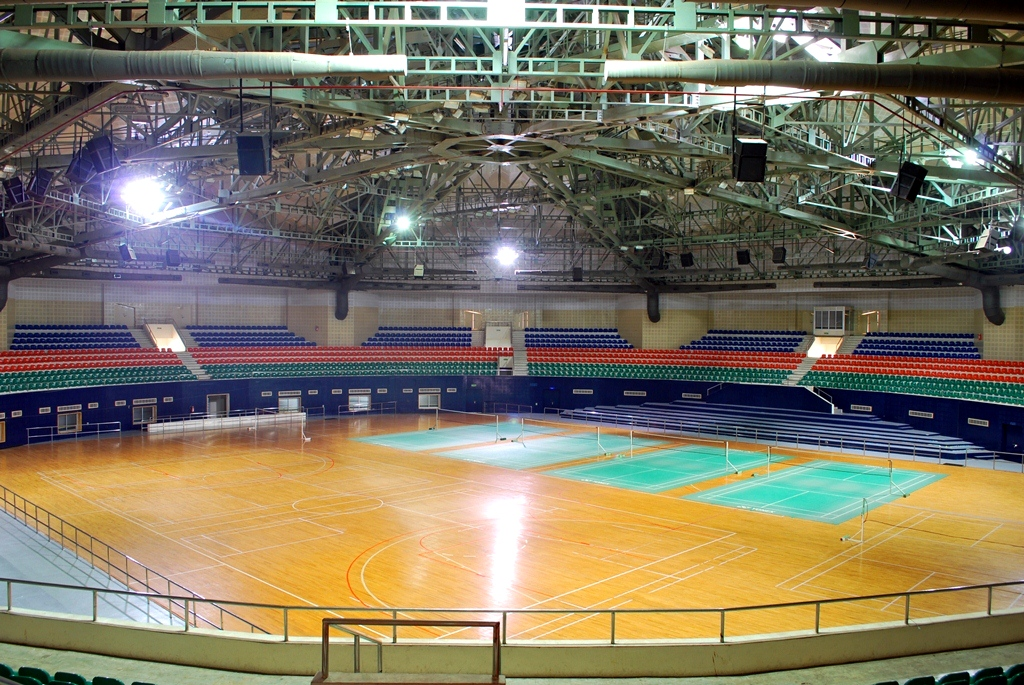
Gachibowli Indoor Stadium

Cricket is the most popular game in the city, and association football and racquet sports are also popular. At the professional level, the city has hosted national and international sports events such as the 2002 National Games of India, the 2003 Afro-Asian Games, the 2004 AP Tourism Hyderabad Open women's tennis tournament, the 2007 Military World Games, the 2009 World Badminton Championships and the 2009 IBSF World Snooker Championship.

Prominent sportspeople from Hyderabad include V. V. S. Laxman, Mohammed Azharuddin, Sania Mirza, Mohammed Siraj, Syed Abdul Rahim and P. V. Sindhu.

== Preservation ==
Preservation of Hyderabadi Culture is a serious issue. After the Integration of Hyderabad into the Indian Union, a large number of eminent personalities and intellectuals from the erstwhile Hyderabad State migrated to Pakistan.

In recent years a number of heritage sites in Hyderabad have been the focus of restoration efforts. Monuments and historic buildings such as Moazzam Jahi Market, the Qutb Shahi Tombs (in the Qutb Shahi Heritage Park), the Paigah Tombs, Mahboob Chowk Clock Tower, the Saidani Ma Tomb, Sardar Mahal, Khursheed Jah Devdi, British Residency, the Bansipalet Stepwell and heritage police-buildings such as the restored Kotwal House / old James Street‐era station buildings have either been fully conserved or are undergoing active restoration. At the same time, several major structures remain neglected and vulnerable: these include the Errum Manzil, Mahbub Mansion, the Osmania General Hospital main building, and the Hillfort Palace among others, which heritage-activists cite as examples of missed conservation opportunities and ongoing decay.

Urdu Calligraphy, or khushkhat, is also a dying art form.

Nawab Mehboob Alam Khan states that many of the old recipes that form Hyderabadi cuisine are being lost.

== See also ==
- Hyderabad
- Hyderabadi Muslims
- Hyderabadi cuisine
- Telugu people
- Culture of Telangana
