= Akkineni Ramesh Prasad =

Indian businessman and film producer

- Born: August 30, 1936 (age 90); Andhra Pradesh, India
- Other name: A. Ramesh Prasad
- Occupations: Businessman; Producer
- Parent: L. V. Prasad (father)
- Relatives: A. Sreekar Prasad (cousin)

Akkineni Ramesh Prasad (born 30 August 1936) is an Indian businessman and film producer, best known for his role as the chairman of Prasad Studios and Prasads Multiplex. He is credited with advancing the technical capabilities of Indian cinema.

The son of filmmaker L. V. Prasad, Ramesh Prasad earned an engineering degree in the United States before founding Prasad Film Laboratories in Madras in 1974. Under his leadership, Prasad Film Laboratories became one of India's largest and most respected post-production facilities, with 12 branches across major cities, including Hyderabad, Mumbai, Bangalore, and international offices in Singapore, Dubai, and the United States. The laboratory has won the National Award for Best Cinematography eight times for laboratory processing. Ramesh Prasad introduced advanced technologies to Indian cinema, including digital intermediate and HD post-production, and expanded into areas such as special effects and film restoration.

Ramesh Prasad further contributed to the film industry by establishing Prasads Multiplex (earlier Prasads IMAX) in Hyderabad, a landmark theatre that became one of the most popular venues in the city. Beyond his business ventures, he served as President of the Film Federation of India from 1988 to 1989 and has held leadership roles in various industry organizations. He is also a founder trustee of the L. V. Prasad Eye Institute, one of India’s leading eye care institutions.

== Early life ==
Akkineni Ramesh Prasad was born on 30 September 1936 as the son of the Indian filmmaker L. V. Prasad. Ramesh Prasad had a brief acting experience as a child in the film Samsaram (1950), where he played N. T. Rama Rao’s son. Despite the film’s success, he was more interested in playing cricket, and after being scolded by his father on set, he lost interest in acting. Ramesh found the film industry less glamorous and slower in recognition compared to today’s standards. Ramesh was initially upset when his father prioritized a film shoot over attending his own mother’s funeral, but later understood his father’s deep commitment to cinema.

== Career ==
=== Prasad Labs ===
Ramesh Prasad obtained a degree in engineering from the United States and initially worked in fabrication. He later shifted his focus to the film industry by establishing Prasad Film Laboratories, which became a pioneering facility for film processing in India. At the time, there were no high-quality laboratories in Madras, and the lab's exceptional work quickly gained a reputation. Prasad Film Laboratories expanded with branches in cities like Hyderabad, Mumbai, Bengaluru, Thiruvananthapuram, and Bhubaneswar. Under Ramesh Prasad's leadership, the lab won the prestigious National Award for Best Film Laboratory eight times for the laboratory processing. In 2002, Prasad Film Laboratories commissioned Asia's first integrated digital film lab in Mumbai, bringing cutting-edge technology to India.

The Prasad Group, under Ramesh Prasad's management, has been instrumental in introducing new technologies such as digital intermediate and HD post-production to India. The company also ventured into special effects and the restoration of old Hollywood films. They also resumed film production, although Ramesh regretted the initial decision to stop making films after L. V. Prasad’s passing, out of fear of tarnishing his father's legacy.

=== Prasads IMAX ===
In 2003, Ramesh Prasad expanded his ventures by opening Prasads, an IMAX theater in Hyderabad. The idea came after a visit to the Smithsonian Museum in Washington, D.C. in the early 1990s, where Ramesh watched an IMAX film To Fly (1976). Inspired by the experience, he decided to bring IMAX technology to India. Prasads became a landmark in the city, making history with the screening of Avatar (2009), which attracted an audience of 300,000.

=== L. V. Prasad Eye Institute ===
Ramesh Prasad is a founder trustee of the L. V. Prasad Eye Institute, established through a donation by his father. He remains the longest-serving member of the institute's governing board, alongside Dr. Gullapalli Nageswara Rao. The institute has become one of the leading eye care centers in India.

=== Leadership roles ===
Ramesh Prasad has held numerous leadership positions in the film industry. He served as President of the South India Film Chamber of Commerce (1986-87, 1991-92), President of the Film Federation of India (1988-89), and President of the Andhra Pradesh Film Chamber of Commerce (2000-01). He was also a member of several advisory committees, including the Export Import Advisory Committee, the Governing Council of the Film and Television Institute of India, Pune, and the Advisory Committee of the Children’s Film Society of India.

== Prasad Group ==
- Prasad Productions Pvt Ltd
- Prasad Film Labs
- Prasad EFX
- Prasad Video Digital
- L.V.Prasad Film and TV Academy
- Prasads Multiplex/Mall Prasads IMAX
- Prasad Panavision
- DCE DubaI
- DCE Singapore and
- Prasad Corp USA.
