= Amjad Hyderabadi =

Urdu and Persian poet from Hyderabad, India

Ahmed Hussain
- Born: 1 January 1888; Hyderabad State, British India
- Died: 31 January 1961 (aged 73); Hyderabad, India
- Occupation: Ruba'i Poet
- Writing career
- Pen name: Amjad Hyderabadi امجد حيدرابادى
- Period: Nizam's era
- Genre: Ruba'i
- Subjects: Humanity, Philosophy

Syed Ahmed Hussain (Urdu: سيد احمد حسين; 1888–1961), better known by the pen-name Amjad Hyderabadi (امجد حيدرابادى), was an Urdu and Persian Ruba'i poet from Hyderabad, India. In Urdu poetic circles he is also known as Hakim-al-Shuara.

During the rule of Nizam of Hyderabad, a flood occurred on 28 September 1908) on the River Musi. Hyderabadi was one of the 150 people who saved their lives by hanging on to the branches of a tamarind tree. He later wrote a poem "Qayamat-e-Soghra" (The Minor Doomsday) detailing his experience. To commemorate the 100th anniversary of the tragedy, Satyanarayana Danish recited this poem.

The Warsi Brothers, an Indian Qawwali musical group, regularly recited his poems in their Qawali in various countries.

== Life ==
Hyderabadi was born in Hyderabad Deccan into a small family.

He saw his entire family, including his mother, wife and daughter get washed away in the Musi River flood of 1908 and he was the only survivor in his family. Most of his Ruba'i reflects his depression at the loss of his family.

== Books written by Amjad Hyderabadi ==
- Rubaiyat Amjad Hyderabadi
- Adabi ijlas wo Mushaera

== Books on Amjad Hyderabadi ==
- Hakeem Al Shuara Amjaad Hyderabadi
- Masterpieces of Urdu Rubaiyat by K C Kanda.

== See also ==
- List of Urdu-language poets
- Siraj Aurangabadi
- Hyderabadi Muslims
