= Hyderabad International Film Festival =

Indian film festival

Coordinates: 17°21′N 78°28′E

The Hyderabad International Film Festival (HIFF) is a film festival in Hyderabad, India.

The first Hyderabad International Film Festival (HIFF) was held in Hyderabad, Andhra Pradesh, India in 2007.

The Hyderabad Film Club, A.P. Film Directors' Association and Films Anonymous organized HIFF as an extension of their activities.

The Second Hyderabad International Film Festival was held in 2008. It was organised by the Hyderabad Film Club and the Telugu Film Directors' Association at Prasads Multiplex, Hyderabad.
