= Prasad Studios =

Post-production company headquartered in Chennai, India

- Type: Subsidiary
- Industry: Media
- Founded: 1956
- Headquarters: Saligramam, Chennai, Tamilnadu, India
- Key people: L. V. Prasad (Founder); Akkineni Ramesh Prasad (Head); Sai Prasad (Director)
- Products: Movies; Studios; Post production Prasads IMAX; Film Restoration
- Parent: Prasad Group
- Website: Officia

Prasad Studios and Prasad Film Labs are motion picture post-production studios headquartered in Chennai, India, founded by Prasad Group in 1956. The production house has produced over 150 films in Telugu, Tamil, Kannada, Malayalam and Hindi languages.

The group is one of the largest chains of post-production facilities in India with 12 delivery units located in all of the major film production centres of India including Hyderabad, Mumbai, Chennai, Bangalore, Thiruvananthapuram, Bhubaneswar and Kolkata and has an overseas presence in Singapore, Dubai, and United States.

It has won the Kerala State Film Award for Best Processing Lab nine times.

== History ==
The group is headed by Ramesh Prasad and Sai Prasad, son and grandson of the late L.V. Prasad respectively. It owns one of the major equipment and film facilities in India for feature film and advertising post production. Prasad Group works in feature films, film and video restoration and commercial advertising production.

== Prasad Group ==
- Prasad Productions Pvt Ltd
- Prasad Studios
- Prasad Film Labs
- Prasad EFX - largest digital restoration facilities in the world
- Prasad Video Digital
- Prasad Extreme Digital Cinema Network Pvt Ltd (PXD)
- L. V. Prasad Film and TV Academy
- Prasads Multiplex / Mall, Prasads IMAX
- Prasad Panavision
- Prasad Corp USA.
- Prasad Digital Intermediate
- DCE Dubai
- DCE Singapore
- DFT - Digital Film Technology GmbH - manufacturers of the Scanity real time motion picture film scanner (2012–2024).

== Locations ==
India:

- Chennai (headquarters)
- Hyderabad
- Mumbai
- Bangalore
- Thiruvananthapuram
- Bhubaneswar
- Kolkata
- New Delhi (sales office)

United States:

- Hollywood (sales office)
- Burbank (sales office)

Germany:

- Darmstadt

Japan:

- Tokyo

UK:

- London

== See also ==
- L. V. Prasad Eye Institute
