= Dargah Yousufain =

Dargah in Hyderabad, India

Dargah Yousufain also known as Yousuf Baba Sharif Baba Dargah is a dargah in Hyderabad, India, where two Muslim Sufi Saints named Syed Shah Yousufuddin and Syed Shah Sharifuddin are buried.

== History ==
The Dome of Dargah was constructed during the era of Nizams.

== Yousuf ==
The burial place of Yousufuddin and Sharifuddin (better known as Yousufain or Shareefain) and their surrounding Sufi Khanqah is known as Yousufain Dargah or 'Yousuf baba-ki-dargah' in Hyderabad.

== Burial ground ==
The burial ground has tombs of notable people in Hyderabad. Daagh Dehlvi – the popular Urdu poet and court musician of the 6th Nizam Mahbub Ali Khan, Asaf Jah VI, was also buried here.

== Early life and Bayat ==
Both spiritual leaders were originally from Shaam (present-day Syria). While performing the holy Hajj, they met Sheikh-E-Azam Shah Kalim Allah Jahanabadi in Makkah(Makkah Al Mukarramah). Sheikh Kaleemullah Jahanabadi was a disciple of renowned Al-Qutub Sheikh Yahya Madani hailing from Medina.

Yousufain Sharifian accepted Bayat (solemn vow of discipleship and covenant faith) of Sheikh Kaleem-ullah Jahanabadi. Yousufain Sharifain followed their spiritual master to Delhi instead of returning home to Syria.

=== Teachings of Sheikh ===
Sheik Kaleemullah Jahanabadi was a Sufi saint and all his life he spread teachings of Islam and silsila chist. His fame is equally spread among the followers of all religions in Delhi and extends to Deccan region. The blessed Sheikh always said make my soul happy by spreading a teachings of silsila chishtia, rather than giving treasure to his family. His teachings were equally popular in civil society as well as armed forces (lashkar). Most of his mureeds(disciples) and Khalifa's(successors) were in army, including Yousufain Sharifain. During the Deccan conquest by Moghals, their hidden identity was revealed to the Moghal King Aurangzeb. After they conquered Deccan they left armed forces and decided to stay in Hyderabad to propagate teaching of Islam. When they died, they were buried in a village called Nampally, which is now in the core area of the city of Hyderabad.

== Awards ==
The dargah was recognized as a heritage site by INTACH in 2008.

== See also ==
- Nampally
