= Errum Manzil =

Coordinates: 17°25′10″N 78°27′18″E

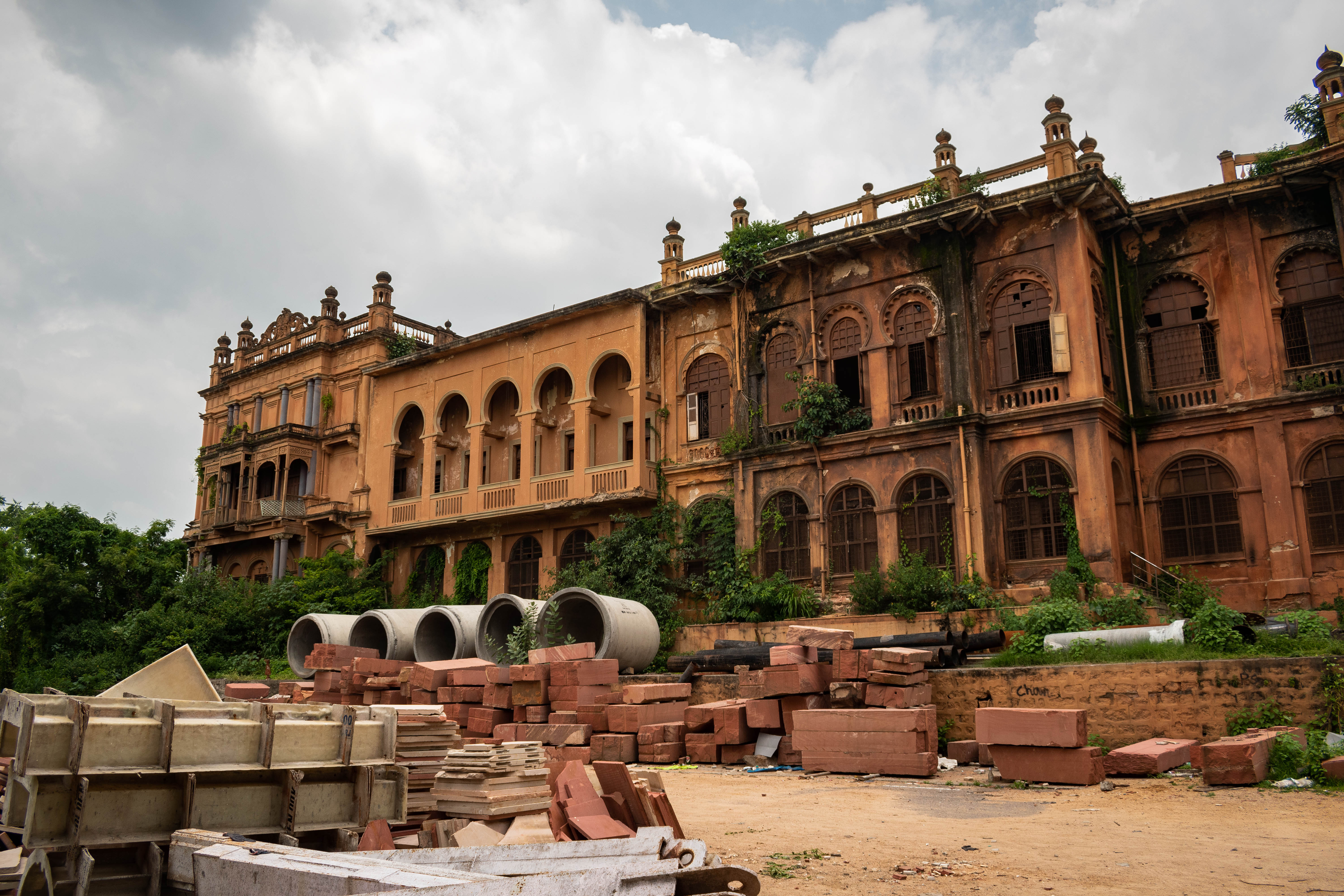

General information
- Type: Royal Palace
- Architectural style: Indo-European Baroque
- Location: Hyderabad, Telangana, India, Irram Manzil Colony, Punjagutta, Hyderabad, Telangana 500082
- Completed: 1870; 156 years ago

Errum Manzil or Iram Manzil is an expansive palace standing in Hyderabad, Telangana, India. It was built around the year 1870 by Nawab Safdar Jung Musheer-ud-daula Fakhrul Mulk, a nobleman of Hyderabad state. It is located on top of a hillock off the Khairatabad - Panjagutta road. The Errum Manzil is well known for its Indo-European baroque style of architecture. Its facades display Doric and Corinthian pilasters, arched windows with verandahs, and a central dome rising above a U‑shaped plan. The palace once included auxiliary stables, a dairy farm, and landscaped gardens, amenities befitting its princely owner.

== History ==
The Errum Manzil is likely named after Iram, a lost city mentioned in the Qur'an that was said to have lofty pillars. The palace was used for royal banquets and other grand events. Later, the palace was taken over by the Government to be used as a records store-house. After some years it was again transferred into the hands of Public Works Department. Presently the land on which the palace is located houses offices of the Engineers-in-chief and the Chief Engineers of the Roads and Buildings and Irrigation/Command Area Development Departments. The Government of Telangana previously announced that the structure would be razed because of its dilapidated state. There has been a coordinated effort by locals to preserve this historic structure. This structure falls under the B2 category on the list Archaeological Survey of India. Recently, a High Court order made it illegal to demolish the structure.

== Architecture ==
The Errun Manzil is well known for its Indo-European baroque style of architecture. During its heyday the palace had over 150 rooms furnished with Louis XVI furniture, nine-hole golf course, polo ground, stable for horses and a dairy farm. The palace was full of stucco and ornamental works. The palace used to overlook the Hussain Sagar, but this view has now been blocked by other buildings.
