= Sakinalu =

Snack made with rice flour from Telangana, India

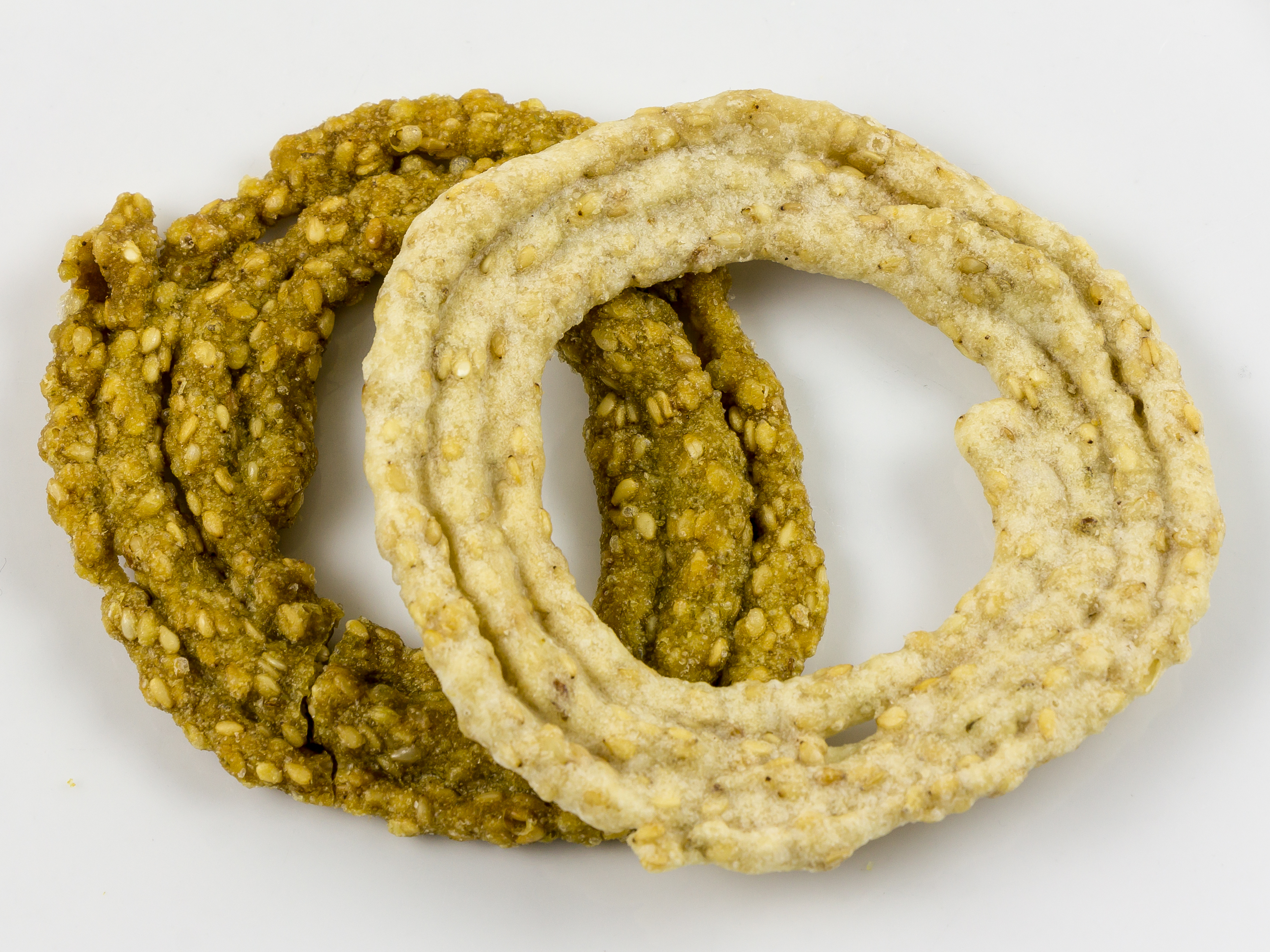
- Type: Snack
- Place of origin: India
- Region or state: North Telangana
- Main ingredients: Rice flour

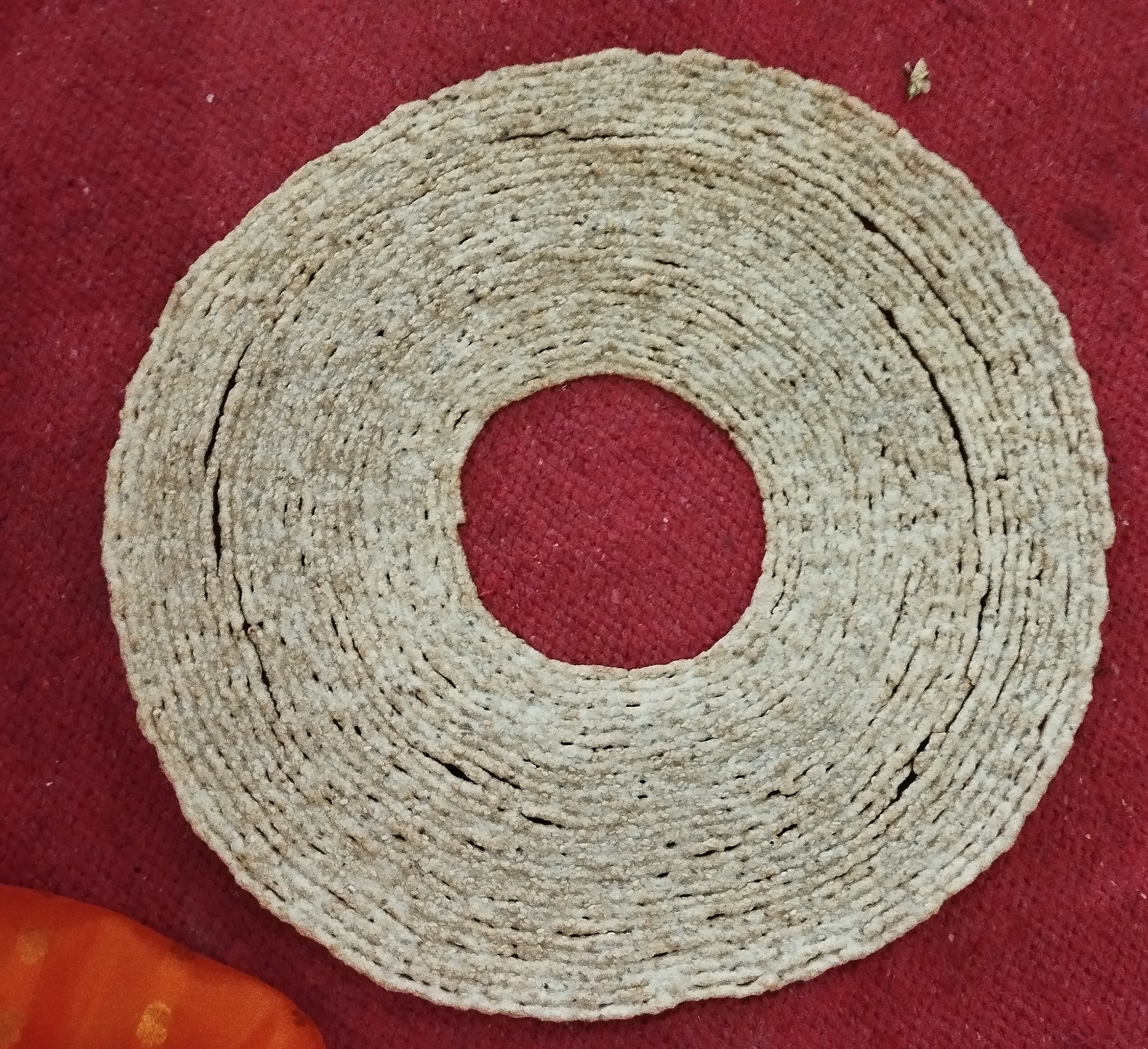
Pedda sakinam

Sakinalu (or sakinaalu, Chakinaalu Telugu: సకినాలు,చకినాలు, చక్కిలాలు) is a special type of snack prepared in the northern region of Telangana, India. It consists of concentric circles made of rice flour dough, fried in oil. It is prepared during the Makar Sankranti festival. As per Telugu tradition, they are given to the groom's parents by the bride's parents to distribute among their relatives and friends.

== Ingredients ==
Sakinalu is made of rice flour seasoned with small amounts of spices, sesame seeds, carom seeds (ajwain), and salt.

== Etymology ==
The word "sakinalu" is believed to be originated from "chakinamu", which is based on "chakram", which means wheel or circle. This is because of its circular shape. The farmer community prepares this traditional festival cuisine during Makar Sankranti when the fresh crop of paddy has been harvested.

== Grade ==
It is recognized as one of the Telangana Traditional Festival cuisines.
