= Saidani Ma Tomb =

Monument in Hyderabad, India

Coordinates: 17.42674°N 78.48709°E

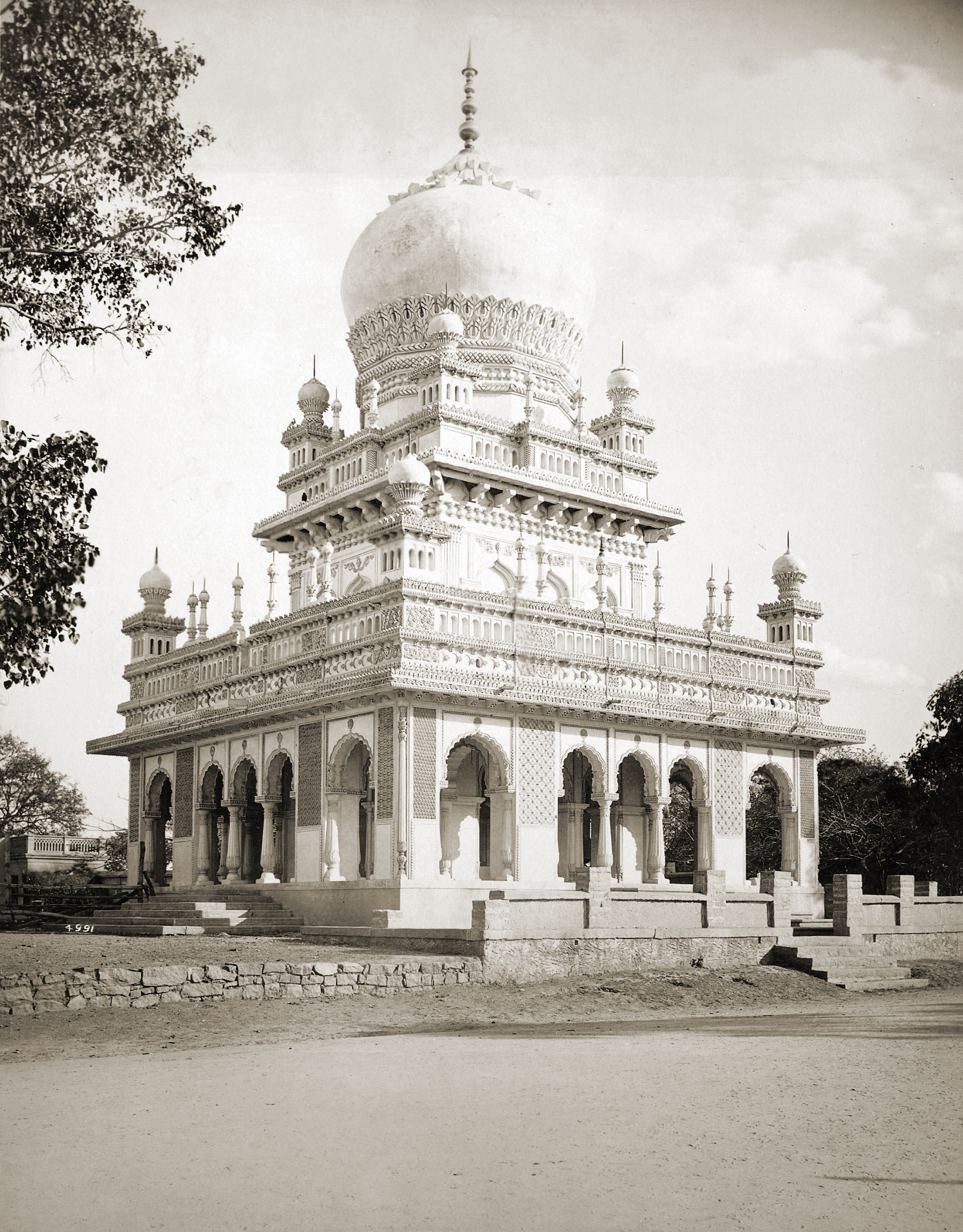
- Saidani Ma Tomb, photographed by Lala Deen Dayal in the 1880s

- Location within Hyderabad
- Location: Hyderabad, Telangana, India

History
- Built: 1883; 143 years ago

Site notes
- Restored: 2023
- Restored by: Aga Khan Trust and HMDA

Saidani Ma Tomb

Saidani Ma Tomb, also spelt Saidani Maa Tomb (also known as Maqbara Saidani Ma Saheba), is a tomb in Hyderabad, India. It is a 19th-century state-protected monument of Telangana, near Tank Bund on the banks of Hyderabad’s Hussain Sagar.

The tomb in Mughal and Qutb Shahi styles with elaborate stucco decorations and fretwork screens (jalis) was built by Nawab Abdul Haq Diler Jung, one of the richest nobles of the time, in memory of his mother Hazrath Saidani Ma Saheba in 1883, during the reign of Asaf Jah VI. Sardar Abdul Haq, who was originally from the Bombay Province bore the title Diler Jang. He was the princely state’s Home Secretary and later became the Director of the Nizam’s State Railways in 1885

The tomb lies underground at the base of the dome and is not open to the public. The structure also has the tomb of Nawab Diler Jung, the son of Saidani Ma, and a Muslim graveyard at the rear.

== See also ==
- Qutb Shahi tombs
- Paigah Tombs
