= Mohiuddin Qadri Zore =

Syed Mohiuddin Qadri Zore
- Born: Syed Mohiuddin Qadri Zore; 25 December 1905; Hyderabad, India
- Died: September 1962; Srinagar, Jammu and Kashmir, India
- Known for: Urdu Scholar

Syed Mohiuddin Qadri Zore (December 1905 – September 1962) popularly known as Dr. Zore was an Indian writer, scholar, poet, literary critic, historian, and social reformer. He is best known for his pursuit of the rejuvenation of Urdu language and literature, writing 61 books in his lifetime, generating a major foundation of the Urdu literature now taught in all schools throughout India. Recognized as the first Urdu linguist, his writing ranged from short stories to novels to poetry, social commentary, scholarly criticism, and linguistic analysis. Along with his written legacy, one of his greatest contributions to revitalizing Urdu was his establishment of the organization Idare Adabiyaat-e-Urdu (also known asAiwan-e-Urdu) dedicated to the recovery, restoration, and digitalization of aging and disintegrating texts, books, and manuscripts, which are used in research of the ancient language. He also helped to found the Abdul Kalam Azad Oriental Research Institute, and a still-published Urdu magazine, known as Sabras.

== Biography ==
Zore was born in Hyderabad, India, in December 1905. He completed his early education there, attending Madrasa-e-Darool Uloom City School, followed by further studies at Osmania College, where he obtained an M.A. with distinction in Linguistic Sciences in 1927.

Due to his exemplary performance as a student, he was sent to London, England, on a fellowship by the ruler of Hyderabad in 1929, where he completed his Ph.D. in linguistic sciences from University of London. He continued his study of linguistics in Paris in 1930 for some time before returning to India.

Upon his return, Zore served as Principal of the Chaderghat Government Degree College, head of the Urdu department at Osmania University, and head of the Urdu Department and Dean of Faculty at Jammu and Kashmir University.

Zore wrote many articles and books on Urdu language and literature, including Tillsm-e-Khayaal, Sayr-e-Golconda and Golconda ke Heeray. His poetry includes Hubbe Tarang, gulzaar-e-Ibrahim and Dakkani Adab ki Tareekh. In addition, Kulliyate Mohammad Quli Qutb Shah (1940), Hayat-e-Mir Muhammad Momin (1941), Dastane-adab Hyderabad (1951), Tazkira makhtutat Urdu Vols. II and III (1951 and 1957), Talib-o-mohni (1957), Maani sukhan (1958), are notable contributions among his works as well. Hindustani Lisaniat (1932), "the Languages of India", throws light on the interesting aspects of the evolution of the Indo-European group of languages. His English composition, Hindustani Phonetics, is a significant work on linguistics.

Kuliyat-e-Muhammad Quli Qutb Shah, the manuscript was edited and published with a preface by Zore in 1940. The Kuliyat contains a number of poems written by the Sultan on the occasion of ceremonies and festivals such as Eid-ut-Fitr, Milad-un-Nabi, Mirag and Basant. It is these poems which are valuable for the study of the cultural life of the people of Golconda.

Zore was married to Tahniath Unnisa begum, daughter of Nawab Raffat Yaar Jang of Hyderabad, India, and she was the first female Sahiba-e-Dewaan Naatgo Urdu female poet. The most famous of her three books is Sabro Shukar. They had nine children, including four daughters and five sons. Zore died in September 1962 at Srinagar, Kashmir, and is buried at Khaniyar Shareef there.

His family still lives in their ancestral house, Tahniath Manzil, at Hyderabad, beside the Idare Adabiyat-e-Urdu. Idare Adabiyat-e-Urdu (since 25 June 1931) is a center for Urdu learning, museum and library built on land donated by Zore's wife. He had four daughters and five sons (Taqiuddin Qadri, Aliuddin Qadri(Lecturer of Economics), Safiuddin Qadri, Rafiuddin Qadri and Raziuddin Qadri). Among all, his oldest daughter Tahzeeb Zore who was known to inherit his major scholarly potential was master's degree in linguistic sciences and topped in Arabic Language in Osmania University and soon became a lecturer at Osmania University in 1960. She got married on 7 May 1961 to Yahya Ali Ahmed Farooqui son of Zore's colleague Lateef Ahmed Farooqui, Professor of Linguistic division – Persian at Osmania University, Hyderabad, and moved to Pakistan in 1964. Likewise, his second daughter Towquir Zore was married to Major Abdul Qayum in Pakistani Army. His third daughter was Towfiq Zore, who got married after her bachelor's and moved to Pakistan. His youngest daughter, Tasneem Zore, was graduated in architectural sciences and was married to an architect, a British citizen and was moved to England. Zore's sons stayed in Hyderabad and remain affiliated with his scholarly legacy and work.

== Selected works ==
- Zore, Syed Mohiuddin Qadri (1960). Hindustani Lisaniyat (in Urdu). Lucknow: Naseem Book Depot.
- Zore, Syed Mohiduddin Qadri (1935). Mata-e-Sukhan: Intikhab-e-Kalam Nawab Aziz Yar Jung Bahadur Aziz (in Urdu). Hyderabad: Aazam Steam Press.
- Zore, Syed Mohiuddin Qadri (1937). Golkunde Ke Heere (in Urdu). Hyderabad: Abr Aheemiya Machine Press.
- Zore, Syed Mohiuddin Qadri (1935). Fan-e-Insha Pardazi (in Urdu). Hyderabad: Aazam Steam Press.
- Zore, Syed Mohiuddin Qadri (1940). Sultan Mohammad Quli Qutb Shah (in Urdu). Hyderabad: Aazam Steam Press.
- Zore, Syed Mohiuddin Qadri (1942). Shaad-e-Iqbal (in Urdu). Hyderabad: Aazam Steam Press.
- Zore, Syed Mohiuddin Qadri (1943). Sair-e-Golconda (in Urdu). Hyderabad: Intizami Press.
- Zore, Syed Mohiuddin Qadri (1944). Saguzisht-e-Hatim (in Urdu). Deccan: Matba Jamia Usmaniya Hyderabad.
- Gaarsaan Datasi Aur Uske Hum Asar Bhi Khawabaan 1961
- Jawahar Sukhan
- Muraqqa Sukhan 1935
- Muraqqa Sukhan Hyderabad Ke Pachchees Mumtaz Shoray Urdu 1935
- Tilassami Taqdeer (Ek Neem Tareekhi Afsana)
- Gaarsa Dataasi
- Kulliyat Sultan Muhammad Quli Qutub Shah 1940

== Bibliography ==
- Jafar, Sayyada (1984). Dr. Zore: Hindustani Adan Ke Memar [Dr. Zore: The Maker of Indian Literature] (in Urdu). Delhi: Sahitya Academy.
