= Pathar-ka-Gosht =

Type of lamb dish prepared in India

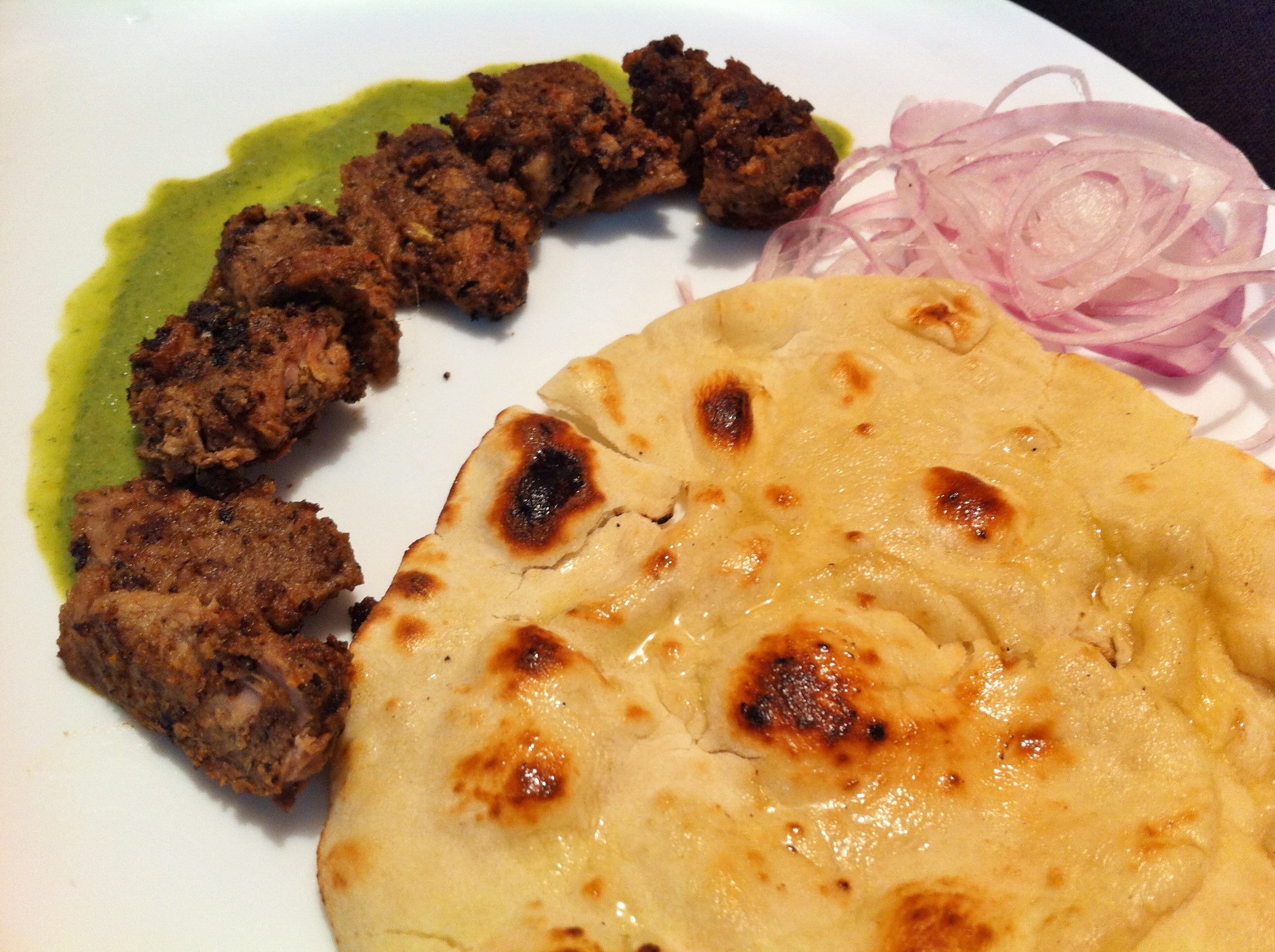
- Course: Main
- Place of origin: India
- Region or state: Hyderabad, Telangana
- Main ingredients: Mutton

Pathar-ka-Gosht - (Urdu: پتھر کا گوشت) is a popular lamb dish, especially prepared in Hyderabad, Telangana, India. This dish is prepared with mutton by heating it on a wide stone, on a flame. The spices are added once the meat pieces are heated and served with onions and other ingredients.
