= Sardar Mahal =

Coordinates: 17.3609°N 78.4764°E

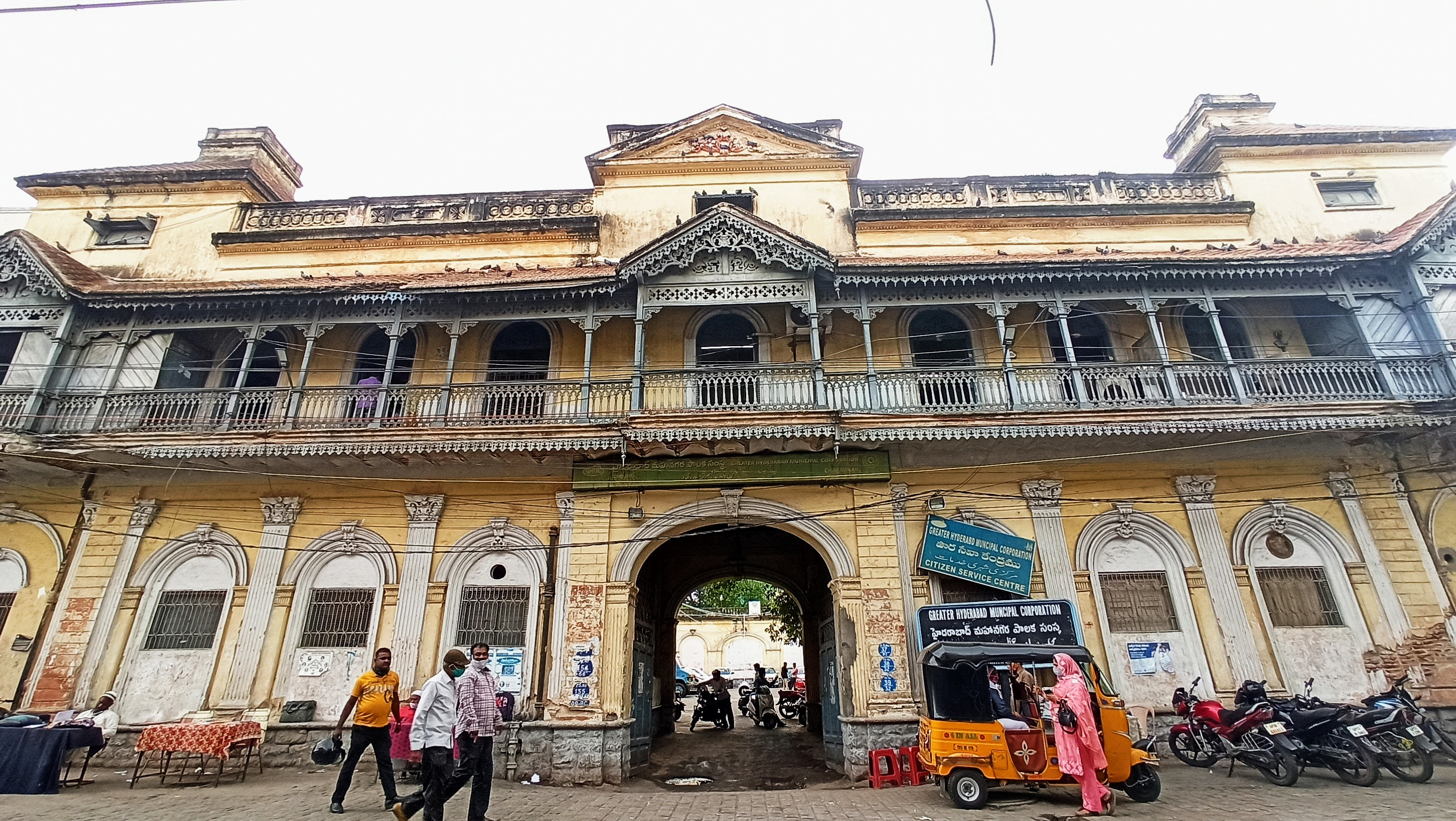
- The façade of the palace
- Interactive map of the Sardar Mahal area

General information
- Type: Royal palace
- Architectural style: European
- Location: Hyderabad, India
- Completed: 1900

Sardar Mahal is a former palace located near Charminar in Hyderabad, Telangana.

== History ==
Sardar Mahal was built in European style by Nizam VI Mir Mahboob Ali Khan in 1900 for one of his consorts, Sardar Begum. As Sardar Begum did not like the construction, she never stayed there. However, the building was named after her.

Greater Hyderabad Municipal Corporation took over the Sardar Mahal in 1965 due to outstanding property taxes. The palace is to be converted into a museum. It was declared as a heritage building by the Heritage Conservation Committee and INTACH.

== Cultural hub ==
This palace is currently undergoing restoration and renovation. Soon a cultural centre will be started here by Kalakriti India.
