= Warsi Brothers =

Indian Qawwali musical group

- Born: Nazeer Ahmad Khan Warsi and Naseer Ahmad Khan Warsi; Hyderabad, Telangana, India
- Occupation: Qawwali singing group
- Awards: Sangeet Natak Akademi Award (2014)

Warsi Brothers are an Indian Qawwali musical group, consisting of brothers Nazeer Ahmed Khan Warsi and Naseer Ahmed Khan Warsi (the Qawwāls), along with eight accompanists (the humnawa or party). They are based in Hyderabad, India.

== Family of qawwals ==
Nazeer and Naseer are the sons of Zaheer Ahmed Khan Warsi, who along with his father, Aziz Ahmed Khan Warsi, constituted the previous incarnation of the Warsi Brothers. Muhammed Siddique Khan, an ancestor of the Warsi brothers, was a singer in the Mughal durbar. In 1857, when the Mughal empire dissolved, he became a court singer for the Nizam of Hyderabad. Muhammed Siddique Khan was the nephew of Tanrus Khan.

== Career ==
Warsi Brothers carry on their legacy by touring all over the world and are known for their intense performances. They perform Amir Khusro's qawwalis in their classical style. They are the music bearers of the gayeki of Delhi gharana and are noted for their melody and improvisation. They are renowned for their traditional Sufiana Qawwali, Ghazals, Thumri, Bhajans based on Hindustani classical music.

== Awards and recognition ==
The Warsi Brothers jointly received the Sangeet Natak Akademi Award for their contribution to Qawwali in 2014. Nazeer Ahmed Khan Warsi and Naseer Ahmed Khan Warsi and Brothers have performed concerts in a number of cities in India as well as in many other countries.

They perform at the dargah of Syed Shah Yousufuddin in Nampally every Thursday night starting from midnight.
