= Khazana Building Museum =

Museum in Hyderabad, India

- Established: 2013
- Location: Golconda Fort, Hyderabad, Telangana, India
- Director: Department of Archaeology

Khazana Building Museum is a Museum located in Hyderabad, Telangana, India. It has a collection of relics from Qutb Shahi, Bahmani and Kakatiya dynasties. The museum is, as of 2018, sealed and not open to the public.

== History ==
The building was built in 1580 AD by the Qutb Shahi kings for housing kingdoms khazana or treasury. It was known as Khazana Khana. The building was renovated and converted into a museum in 2013. It is located in the vicinity of Golconda Fort.

== The Collection ==
The museum has a collection of rare coins to centuries-old relics unearthed during various excavations, 3,500 arms and weapons of Qutb Shahi, stone sculptures from neighbouring regions of Chalukya and Kakatiya, artefacts from the Bahmani kingdom.

== See also ==
- Nizam's Museum
