= Syed Shah Yousufuddin =

Military commander

- Resting place: Nampally
- Occupation: Military commander
- Known for: Surviving a hurricane

Syed Shah Yousufuddin and Syed Shah Sharifuddin were military commanders in the army of the last Mughal emperor Aurangzeb, who according to legend sought their help in conquering the Kingdom of Golconda, a well-defended fort atop a granite hill.

According to the legend, during the siege of Golconda, when Mughal ruler Aurangzeb's army was camped around the fort for several months, there was a hurricane that swept over the camped troops and blew away almost everything. The troops were left in the open and exposed to the elements. Only one tent remained; miraculously the candle in the tent still burned, and the flicker of the candle attracted the attention of the troops.

When the troops arrived at the tent they could see the shadows of two men inside. Upon investigating, they found that it was the tent of two of the commanders of Aurangzeb. They had been reading the Quran in candlelight, and the storm blew over, but did not disturb them or their surroundings. They were made famous by this incident and recognized as great saints.

When they died, they were buried in the village of Nampally, Hyderabad. Their graves remain and are visited by people of all faiths. They are more popularly known as Yousuf Baba and Sharif Baba.

== Title ==
Yousufuddin and Sharifuddin (better known as Yousufain or Shareefain) and his Khanqah known as Dargah Yousufain in Hyderabad.

== Early life ==
Both Yousufuddin and Sharifuddin were originally from Shaam (now Syria). While on pilgrimage they met Sheikh E Azam Peer Kaleem ullah Jahanabadi in Mecca.

They accompanied kaleem ullah Jahanabadi to Delhi and later on his instructions they joined the Moghal Force under Aurangzeb regime.

After conquering Deccan they left forces and decided to stay in Hyderabad, where they were later buried.

== See also ==
- Map location of the Tomb of the Saints
- The Saints in the News; The Times of India
- Image of the Visitors at The Mausoleum
