= Prasads Multiplex =

Cinema in Hyderabad, India

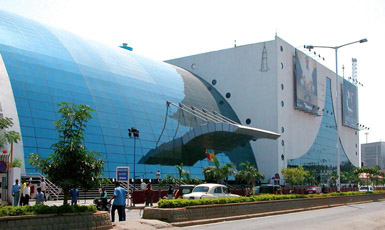
- Prasads IMAX theatre
- Location: Khairtabad, IMAX Road, NTR Marg, Near NTR Gardens, Necklace Road, Hyderabad, India
- Coordinates: 17.412842°N 78.465879°E
- Opened: 25 July 2003
- Developer: Prasad Media Corporation Limited
- Num. of stores: 243
- Website: Prasads

Prasads Multiplex is an Indian multiplex theater in Hyderabad, Telangana. It was India's third IMAX theatre prior to the theatre's 2014 conversion to Prasads' in-house premium large format, PCX. It is a part of the LV.Prasad Group that has been an integral part of the South Indian film industry for over 7 decades.

== Description ==
The multiplex is a centrally air-conditioned venue with an area of 235,000 sq ft (21,800 m^{2}). It has six screens, a food court and a shopping mall covering two levels of the complex.

== History ==
Prasads Multiplex was launched initially as Prasad IMAX on 25 July 2003 by LV Prasad Group. The PCX screen number 6 was previously branded as a 3D IMAX 70mm theatre until 2014. It is the biggest in India at 64 ft × 101.6 ft (19.5 m × 31.0 m) in a 630-seat auditorium.

== Gallery ==
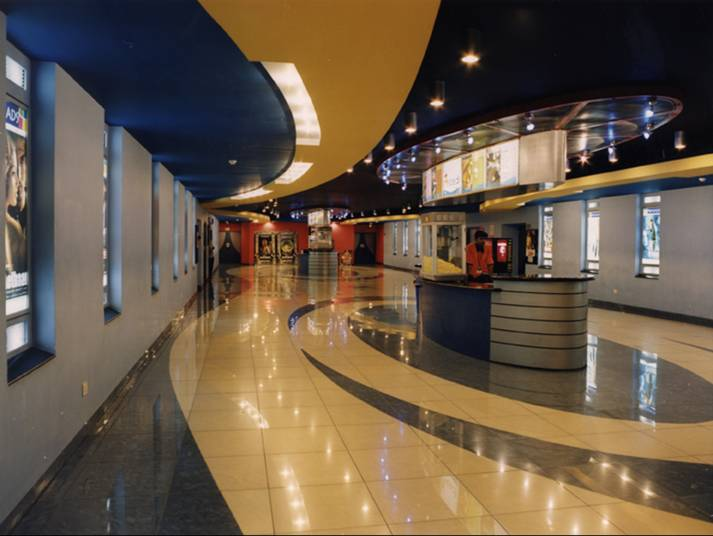
Multiplex floor

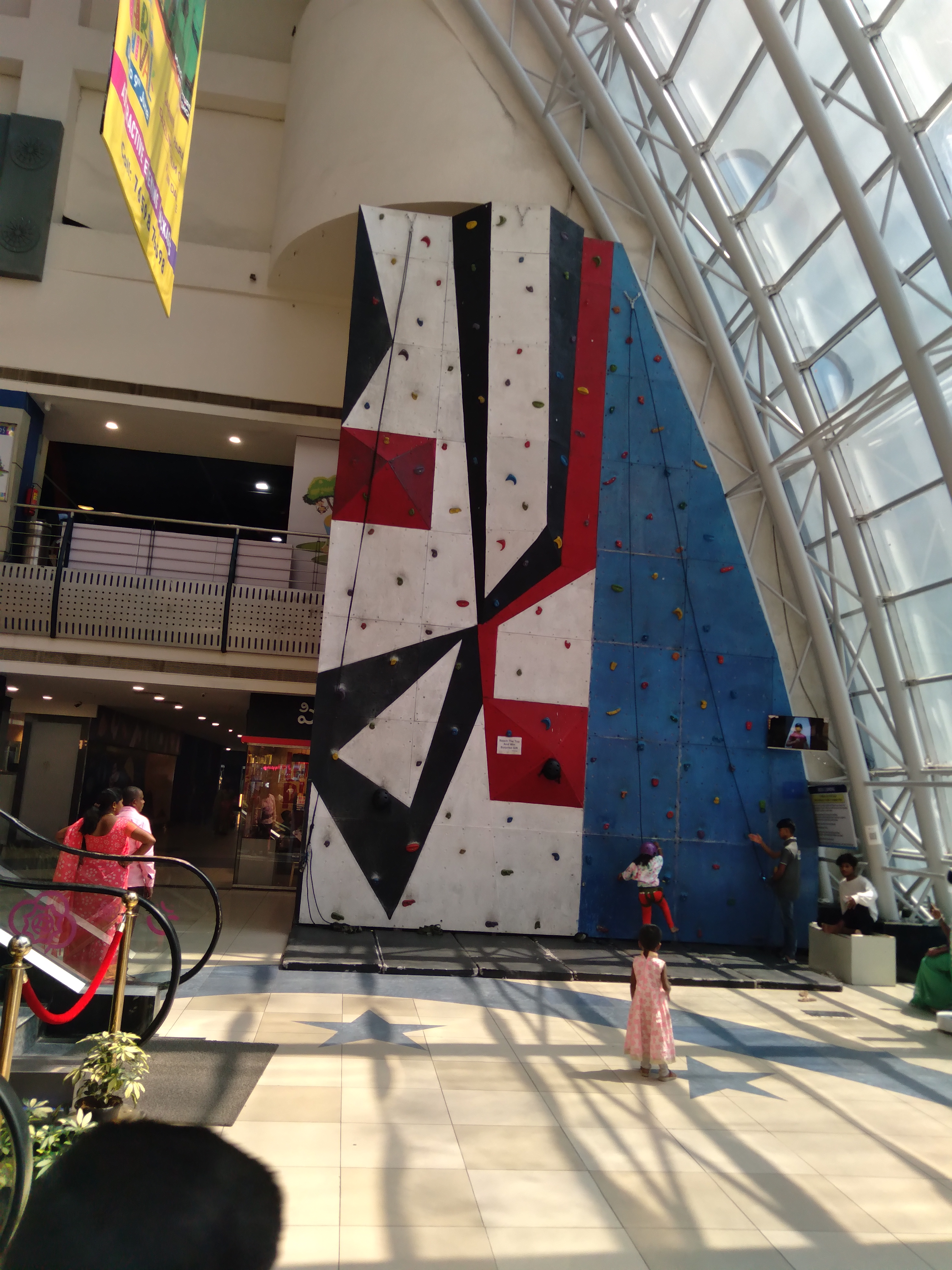
Indoor Climbing wall

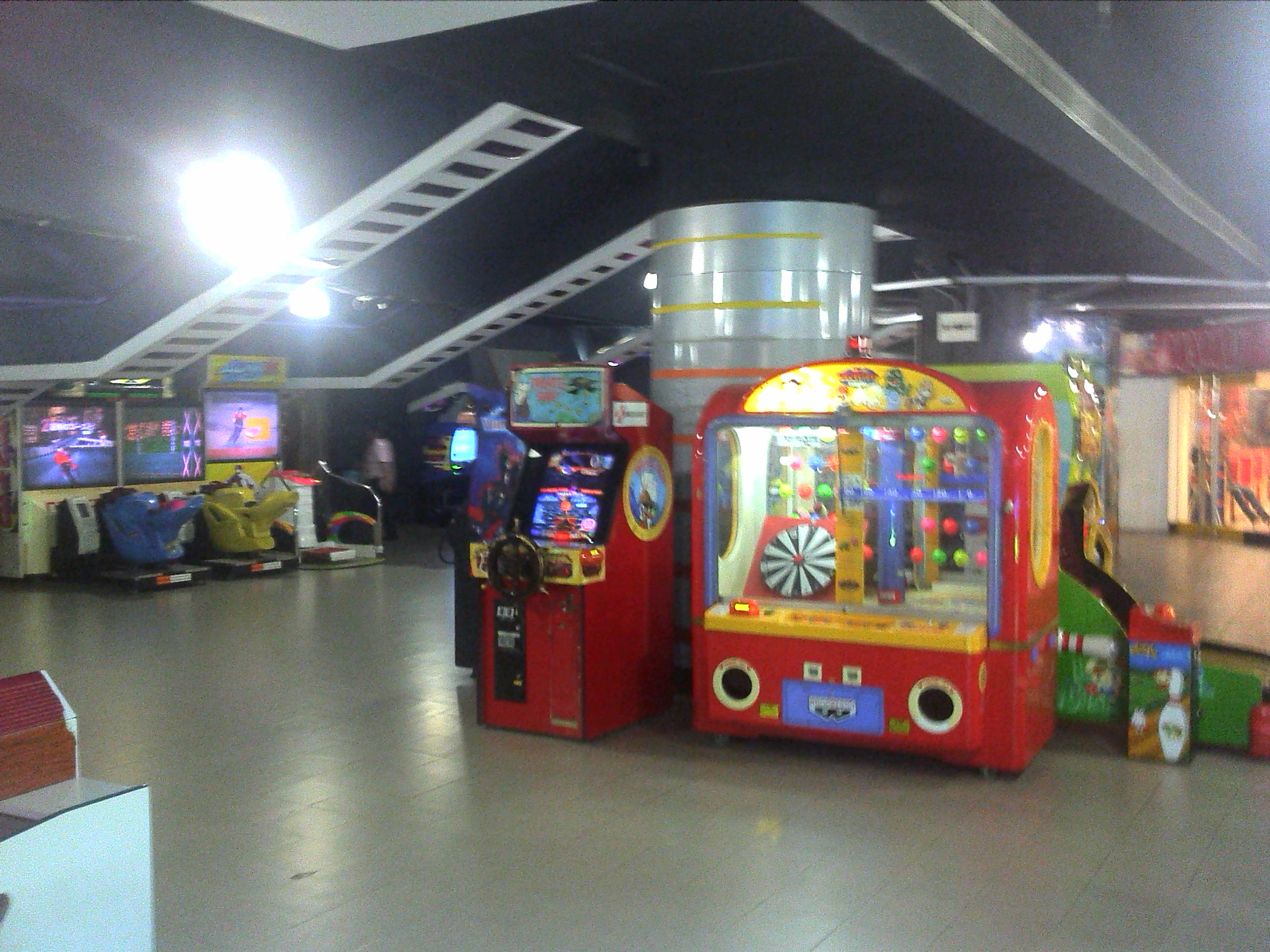
Game section

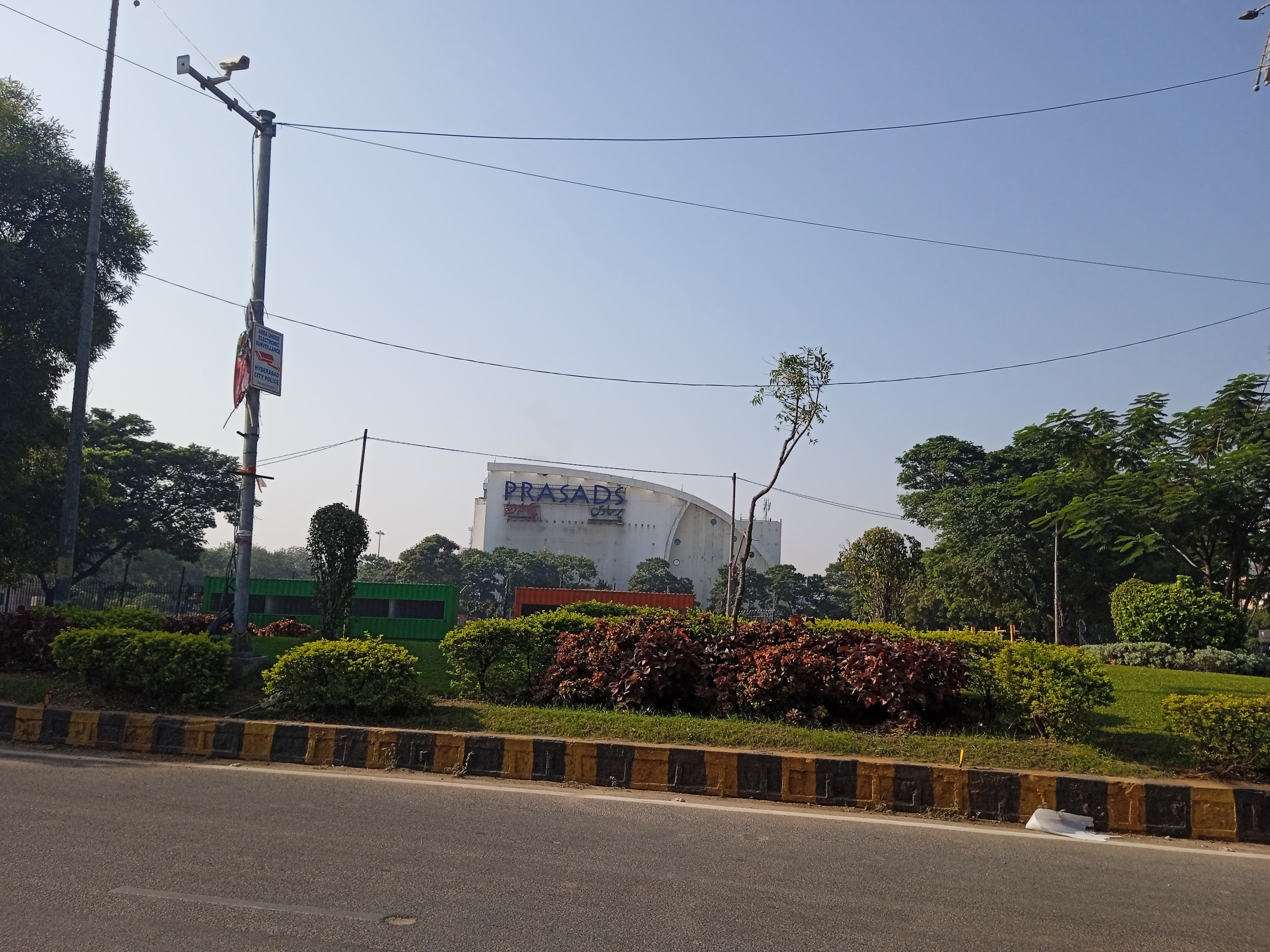
Prasads Imax, Hyderabad

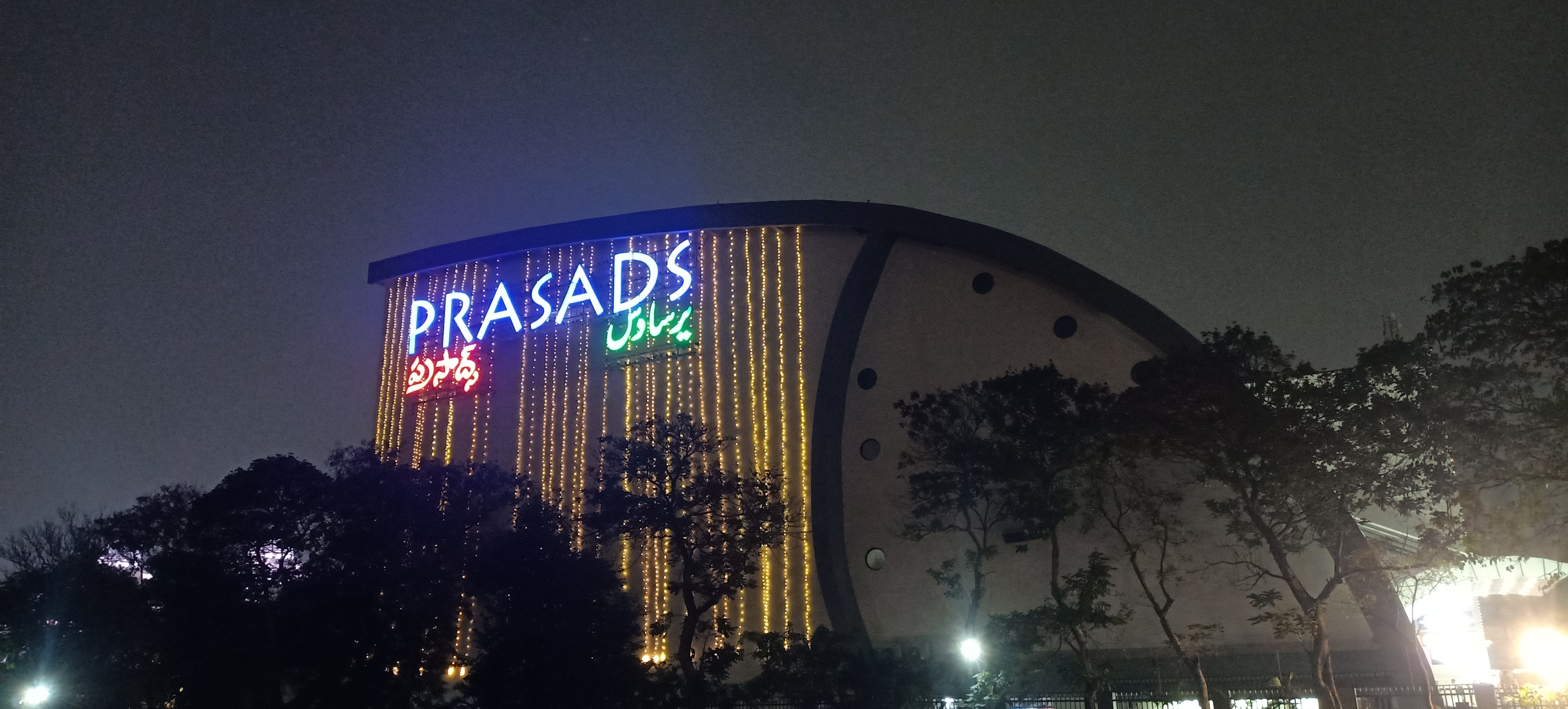
Night View of Prasads Multiplex from HMDA Grounds
