= Hyderabadi Muslims =

Indian Muslim community

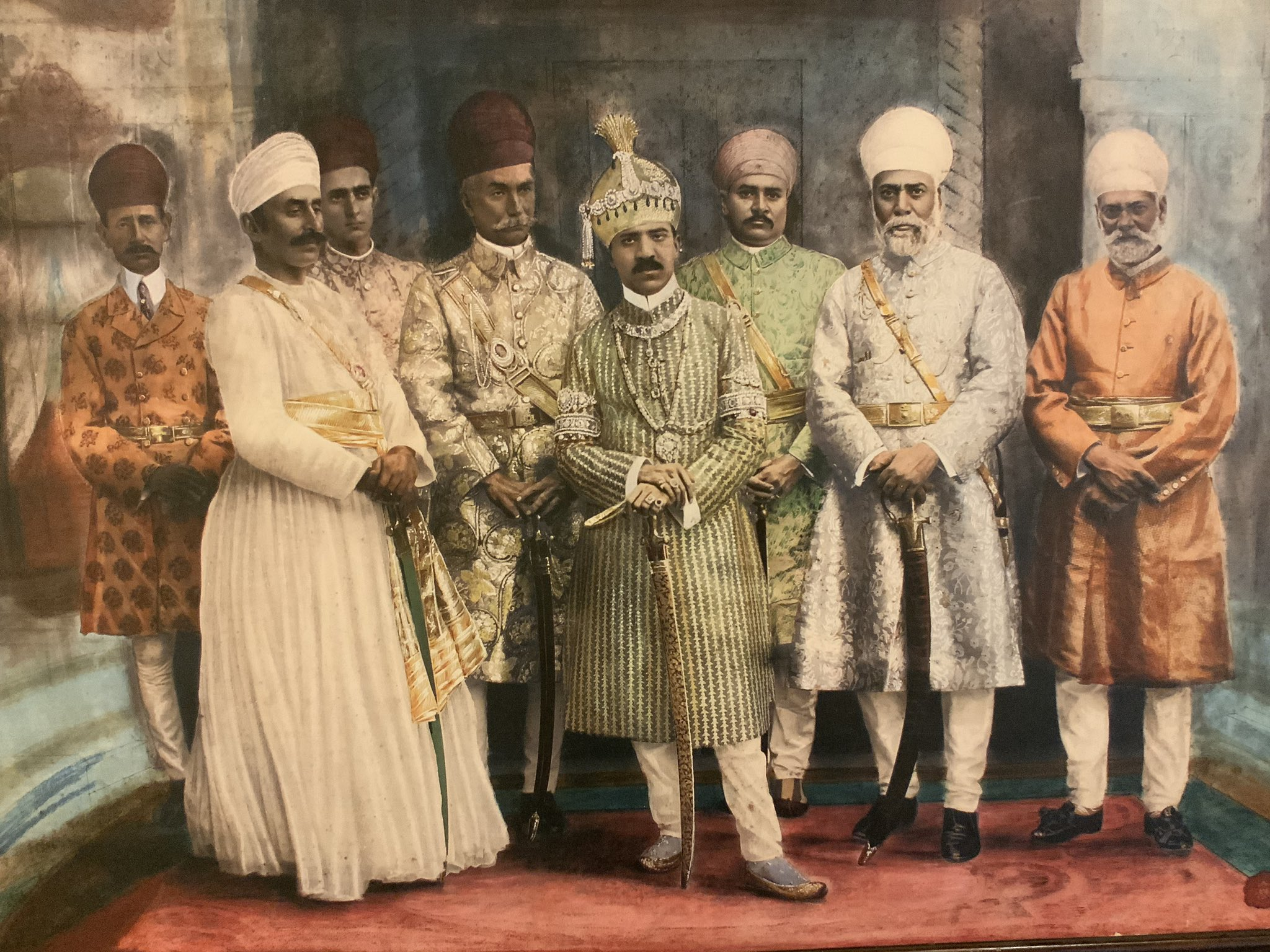
- The portrait of the VIIth Nizam

Total population
- 2,187,005 (1941); 1.71 million (2011) in Hyderabad district

Regions with significant populations
- India • Pakistan • Saudi Arabia • United Arab Emirates Qatar • United States • United Kingdom • Turkey • Canada • Australia • Tanzania • Azerbaijan • Egypt • Oman

Religions
- Islam (majority Sunni Muslims, followed by Twelver Shia and Ismaili Shia Muslims)

Languages
- Standard Urdu (also Deccani Urdu and its sub-dialect Hyderabadi Urdu); English and the vernacular languages of other countries in the diaspora

Hyderabadi Muslims, also referred to as Hyderabadis, are a community of Deccani people, from the area that used to be the princely state of Hyderabad in the regions of Marathwada, Telangana, and Kalyana-Karnataka.

While the term "Hyderabadi" commonly refers to residents in and around the South Indian city of Hyderabad, regardless of ethnic origin, the term "Hyderabadi Muslims" more specifically refers to the native Urdu-speaking ethnic Muslims of the erstwhile princely state. The collective cultures and peoples of Hyderabad Deccan were termed "Mulki" (countryman), a term still used today. The native language of the Hyderabadi Muslims is Hyderabadi Urdu, which is a dialect of the Deccani language.

With their origins in the Bahmani Sultanate and then the Deccan sultanates, Hyderabadi culture and cuisine became defined in the latter half of the reign of the Asif Jahi Dynasty in Hyderabad. The culture exists today mainly in Hyderabad, Aurangabad, Parbhani, Nanded, Raichur, Bidar, Gulbarga, and among the Hyderabadi Muslim diaspora around the world, in particular, Pakistan, the Arab states of the Persian Gulf, United States, Canada and the United Kingdom.

== History ==
The Deccan Plateau acted as a bulwark sheltering South India from the invasions and political turmoil that affected North India. This allowed the Muslim-ruled state of Hyderabad to develop a distinctive culture during the Qutb Shahi dynasty, the brief Mughal rule and later the Asaf Jahi dynasty of the Nizams.

According to Time, the seventh Nizam was the richest man in the world during the late 1940s, and fifth richest person of all time according to Forbes magazine after adjustment for inflation and currency purchasing power parity.

The Nizam was the Muslim ruler of the vast princely Hyderabad State. The capital city of Hyderabad was primarily Urdu-speaking Muslim until the incorporation of Hyderabad into India and the subsequent rise to dominance of the native Telugu-speaking Hindu people of Telangana. The state's economy was agrarian, and Hyderabad was primarily a government and administrative hub, run mostly (but far from exclusively) by Muslims. The aristocracy, jagirdars and deshmukhs (wealthy landowners), and even minor government officials, could afford to hire servants, usually also Muslims, in a social order similar to the class system of Victorian England. The Nizam allied himself with the British early on, with ensuing political stability.

After the fall of the Mughal Empire in 1857, many Muslim writers, poets, scholars, musicians and other eminent personalities migrated from Delhi to Hyderabad in hope of seeking patronage of the Nizam or the nobility. Muslims continued to emigrate to the state seeking employment in the Nizam's court, army, Hyderabad Civil Service or educational institutions. Among those who spent significant time in Hyderabad are writers Dagh Dehlvi, Fani Badayuni, Josh Malihabadi, Ali Haider Tabatabai, religious scholar Shibli Nomani and classical musicians Tanrus Khan and Bade Ghulam Ali Khan.

After Indian independence from the British Raj, Hyderabad State, under the rule of the seventh Nizam lasted for a year, until 18 September 1948, when the Indian Army launched Operation Polo Hyderabadi military forces who wished for Hyderabad State to remain independent. The Indian army soon decided to intervene. The operation resulted in the massacre of thousands of Muslims.

=== Hyderabadi Muslim identity after integration ===
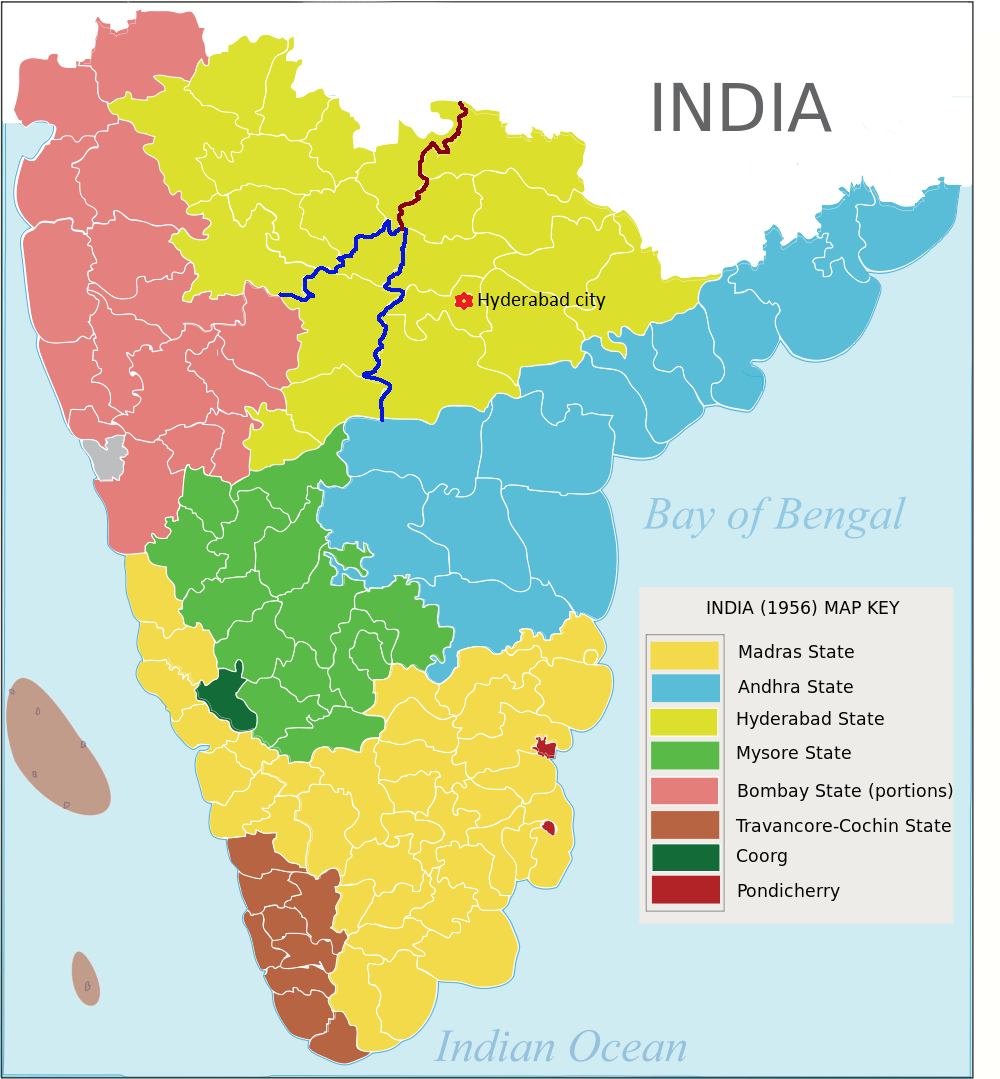
Hyderabad State Divided Amongst Three New Indian States

The Invasion of Hyderabad by the newly independent Dominion of India, other than the shock of the controversial massacre, created an identity crisis for the Hyderabadi Muslim people. Thousands of Hyderabadi Muslims emigrated from the then integrated Indian state of Andhra Pradesh to Pakistan, the UK, the U.S. and Canada, resulting in a large diaspora.

The people who migrated to Pakistan were covered under term Muhajir, along with other Urdu-speaking immigrants from present day India. The Muhajir people began to dominate politics and business mainly in the metropolitan city of Karachi but their Hyderabadi Muslim identity was lost, and replaced by Karachi's cosmopolitan culture. The Hyderabadi Muslims who stayed in integrated Andhra Pradesh were faced with new language issues, and a wave of immigration of more Telugu people from the coastal areas as well as other Indian states, especially after 1956.

After the Indian reorganization of 1956, with states being divided on linguistic lines, Hyderabadi Muslims, in Telangana, Marathwada, and Kalyana-Karnataka were faced with the emerging dominance of the indigenous Telugu, Marathi, and Kannada languages respectively. Their native language Dakhini became a home language, while Urdu, once dominant in the politics of these regions became comparatively less widespread.

The relative isolation of Hyderabad until annexation to India, its distinctive dialect of Urdu and the strong web of interconnecting family relationships that still characterizes Hyderabadi Muslims, sometimes leads to charges of parochialism from other Indian Muslim communities, but it also ensures a Hyderabadi Muslim identity endures among the Indian diaspora.

== Demographics and distribution ==
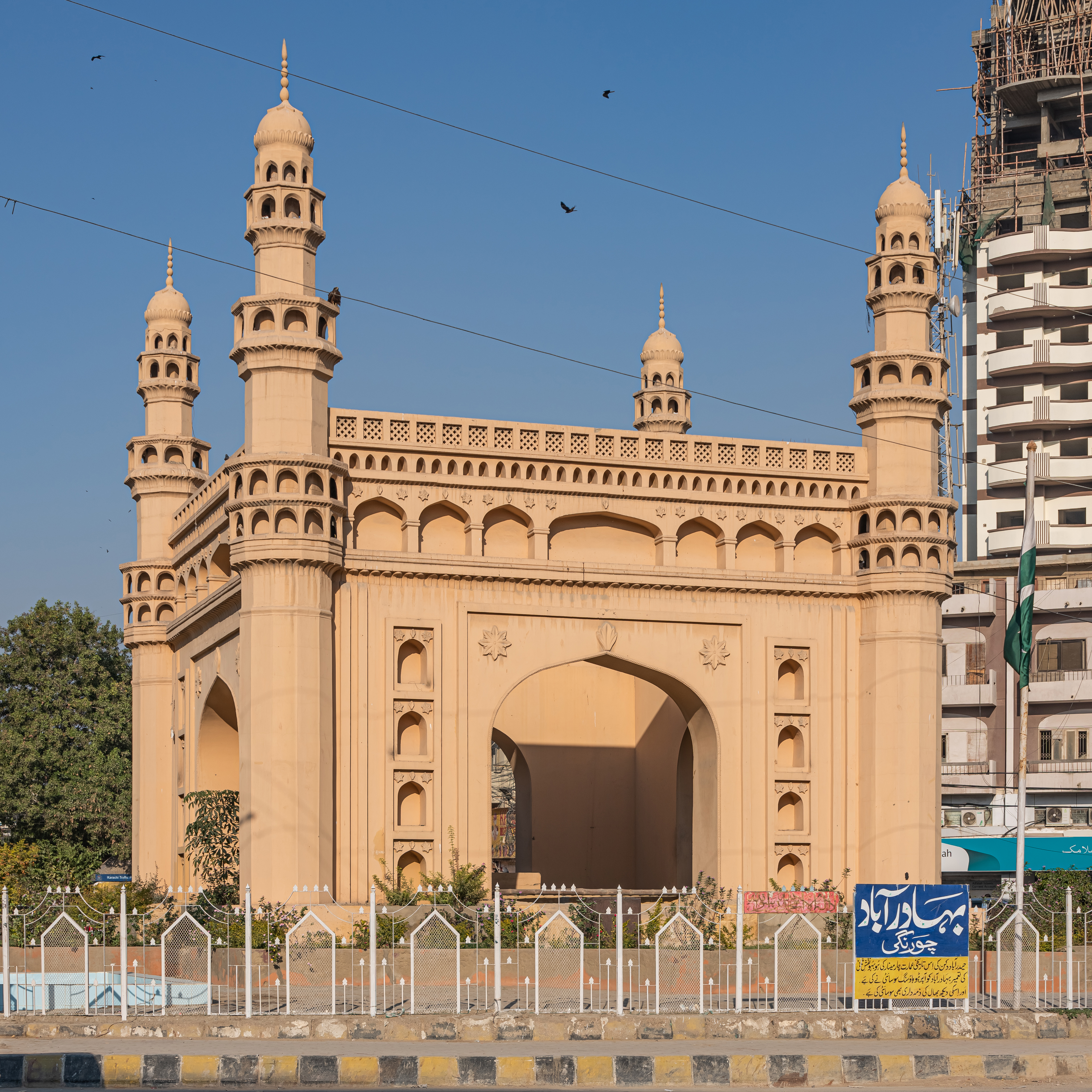
A replica of the Charminar built by Hyderabadi Muslims in Bahadurabad, Karachi, Pakistan

The largest concentration of Hyderabadi Muslims is in the old city of Hyderabad. After the Partition of India and the Incorporation of Hyderabad by India, the Muslims of the state lost their privileged status, so significant numbers chose to migrate to other countries such as Pakistan, the Arab States of the Persian Gulf, the United States, UK, Canada and Australia.

A section of Muslims in Hyderabad are of Hadhrami Arab origin, who came to serve in the Nizam's military. They are known as Chaush and mostly reside in the Barkas neighbourhood of Hyderabad. Opposed to the popular belief, they are not considered a part of Hyderabadi Deccani Muslims. There are also some Siddis who are of African descent.

In Pakistan, most of the Hyderabadi migrants are settled in the southern port city of Karachi. According to a 2003 Estimate, the population of the Hyderabadi population in Karachi was stated to be 200,000. The main neighbourhoods where the Hyderabadi migrants in Karachi initially settled were Hyderabad Colony, Bahadurabad, and Liaquatabad. In 2007, a replica of the famous Charminar monument in Hyderabad was built at the main crossing of Bahadurabad. Some notable Pakistani people who migrated from the former Hyderabad State include Abul A'la Maududi, Anwar Maqsood, Asif Iqbal Razvi, Faysal Quraishi, Mohammed Ehteshamuddin, Muhammad Raziuddin Siddiqui, Naseer Turabi, Syed Mohammad Ahsan, and Waheed Yar Khan.

In the United States, Hyderabadi Muslims form a close-knit segment of the South Asian diaspora, with significant populations concentrated in metropolitan areas such as Chicago, Detroit, Dallas, Houston, Atlanta, the San Francisco Bay Area, and New York City. Among these, Chicago and Dallas are known to have some of the largest and most active Hyderabadi Muslim communities. These communities have established mosques, cultural centers, and organizations that reflect their unique Deccani heritage. For instance, the Masjid-e-Alam in Chicago, the Dallas Islamic Center, and Masjid-e-Khadeejah in Garland, Texas, are closely associated with Hyderabadi Muslim founders and patrons. Other mosques like the Al-Noor Society in Chicago and several community mosques in Detroit’s suburbs such as Islamic Association of Greater Detroit (IAGD) in Rochester Hills and others in Canton, as well as Houston’s Hillcroft district, also see significant involvement from Hyderabadi Muslims. Organizations such as the Hyderabadi American Society and informal networks across states actively host events that blend faith, food, and identity.

In recent years, many younger-generation Hyderabadi Muslims in the diaspora have increasingly intermarried with other South Asian diaspora communities — including Pakistanis, North Indian Muslims, and Bangladeshis — leading to more culturally blended households.

=== Classification ===
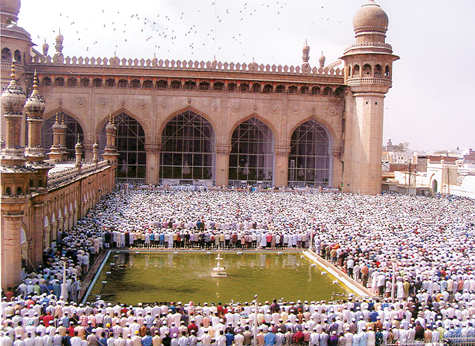
Muslims offer Friday Prayers at Mecca Masjid.

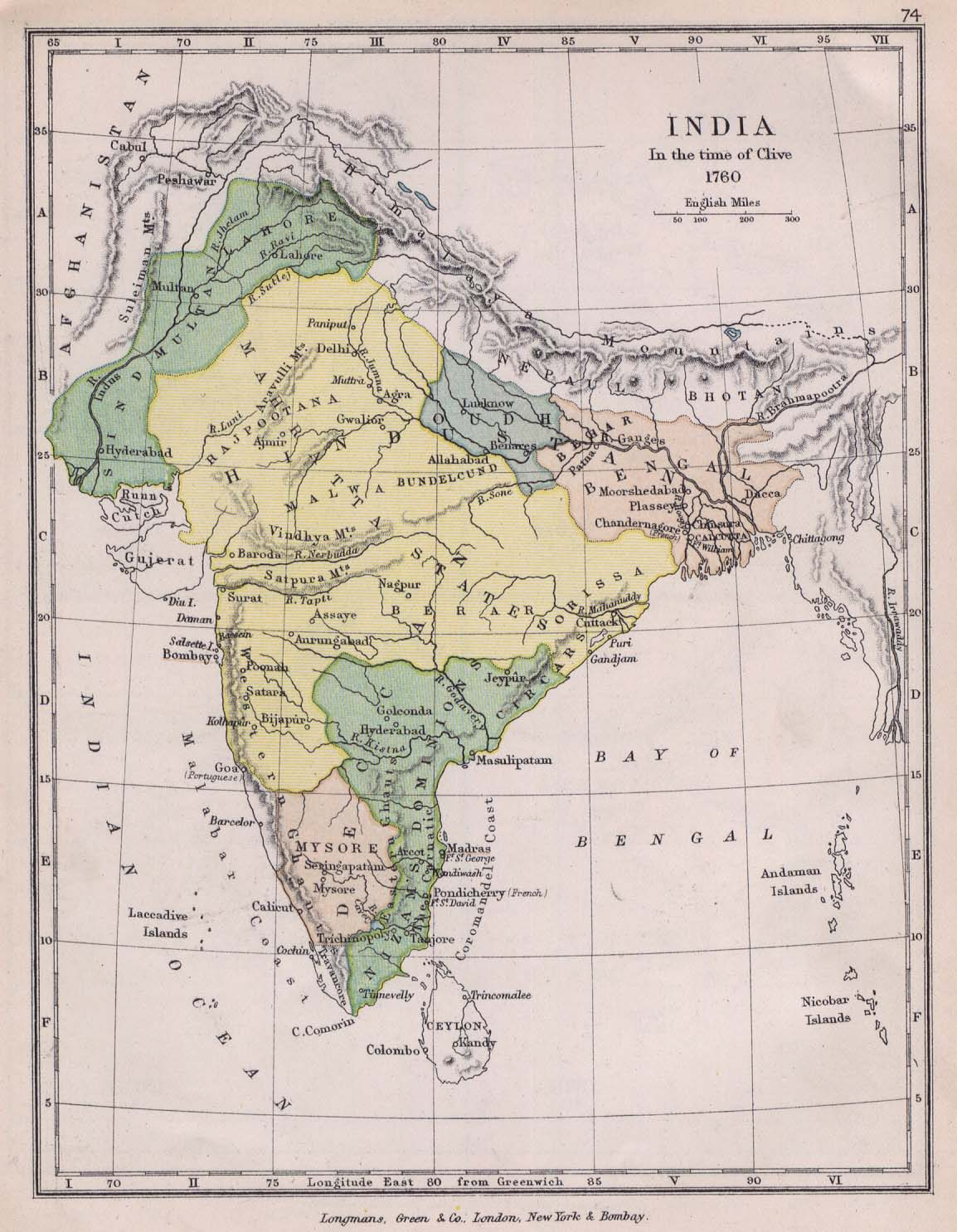
Hyderabad Deccan (Green in the South) at its greatest extent

Hyderabadi Muslims today, refer to the Urdu speaking Muslim community, from the 1801 landlocked princely state of Hyderabad, who developed a distinct cultural identity from other Dakhini Muslims. Even though the princely state of Hyderabad had once reached the southernmost points of India, it's the culture from the known landlocked territories of the Nizam, that constitutes Hyderabadi Muslim culture, while the Dakhini Muslims of the Carnatic, and the Circars, developed their own distinct culture, and culinary tradition. The Chaush community, even though they speak Urdu, and live in the erstwhile Hyderabad State, are usually not considered Hyderabadi Muslims, since they came recently to the region. Even though they absorbed many Hyderabadi Muslim cultural features, namely language and cuisine (Chaush cuisine has more Arab influences), they're a more homogeneous group, of Hadhrami Arab ancestry, and reside in close knit Chaush communities such as the Barkas neighborhood of Hyderabad. This is compared to most Hyderabadi Muslims, who have ancestries from various ethnic origins, most notably from Northern India, are less a homogeneous group.

== Culture ==
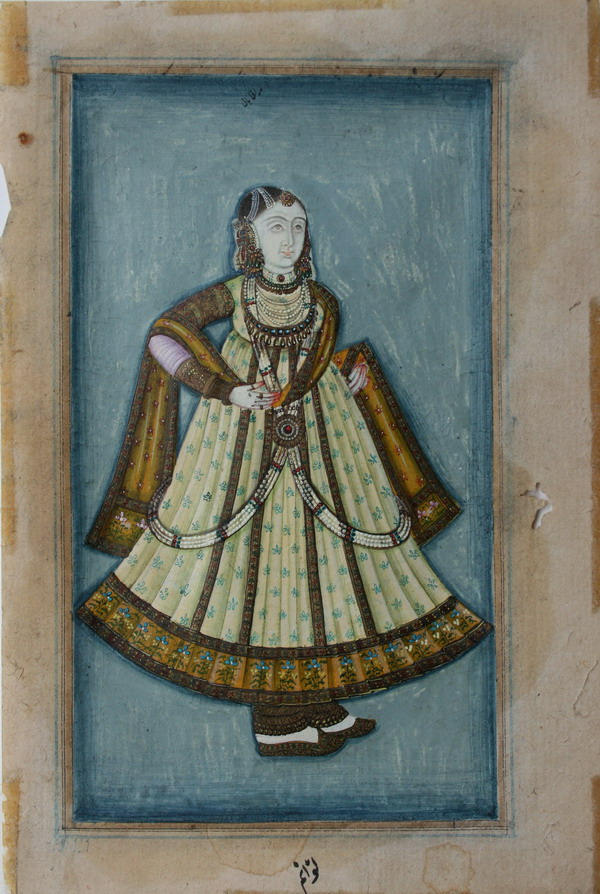
Mah Laqa Bai

Hyderabadi Muslims, are noted for their hospitable nature also known as Deccani Tehzeeb. While Hyderabadi Muslims take pride in their "Nawabi" language, literature, poetry, architecture, and cuisine, the performing arts are often overlooked, especially regarding Hyderabadi culture. In fact, the culture of the Hyderabadi Muslims is being lost. The founding of the city of Hyderabad can be attributed to Ali who is popularly known as Hyder meaning The Lion and four minarets of Charminar represents four caliphs. Tales of the legendary dancers Taramati, and Premamati, are also an insight into the rich culture under the Qutb Shahi era. Mah Laqa Bhai, a prominent Hyderabadi Muslim poet of the 18th century, patronized the Kathak dance form in the courts of the Nizam, which is now being lost amongst Hyderabadi Muslims.

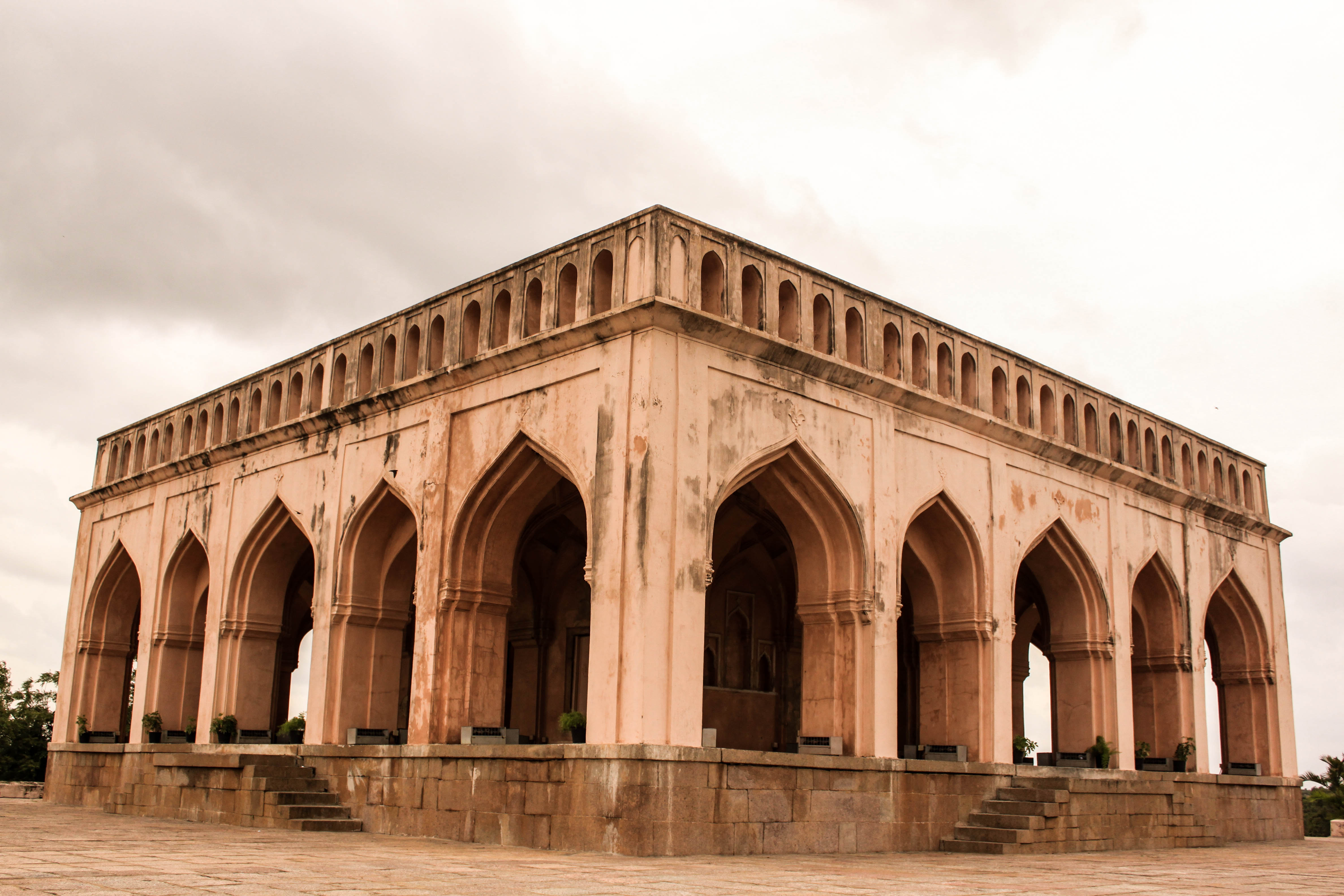
The legendary Taramati used to sing for travelers at the Taramati Baradari

Apart from these, a traditional Hyderabadi Muslim wedding is identified by various local traditional elements, such as the traditional garb, Sherwani for the groom and Khada Dupatta along with jewelry for the bride, as well as Hyderabadi cuisine served at the ceremony.

Another cultural practice unique to the region is Tasmia Qwani also known as Bismillah Ceremony, family ceremony in which a Muslim child is initiated to read the Quran. It is also characterized by local elements.

Communal Harmony, known as Ganga-Jamuni Tehzeeb, is integral to the Culture of Hyderabad.

Other than musical forms of art, Hyderabadi Muslims have taken great honour in the writing, and reading of poetry, and annual Mushairas and Mehfils take place around the world, which has become a symbol of unity for Hyderabadi Muslims, and Urdu poets alike, continuing an ancient tradition.

=== Language and literature ===
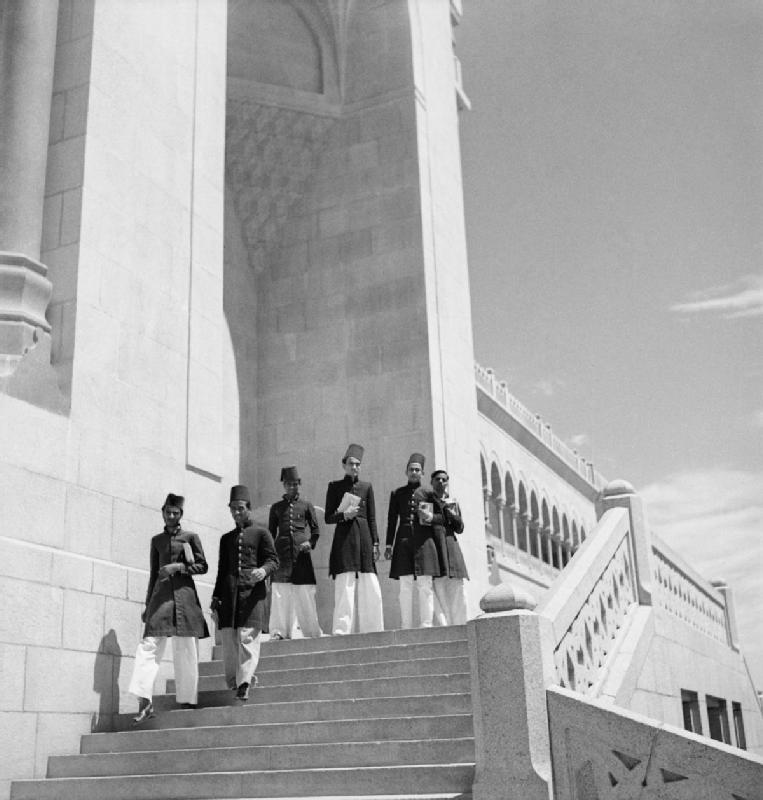
Students at the Osmania University, circa 1940s

One of the most identifiable markers of Hyderabadi Muslim culture is the local dialect of Urdu, called Hyderabadi Urdu which in itself is a form of Dakhini. It is distinct by its mixture of vocabulary from Turkish, Persian and Arabic, as well in some vocabulary from Telugu and Marathi that are not found in the standard dialect of Urdu. In terms of pronunciation, the easiest way to recognize a Hyderabadi Urdu is use of "nakko" (no) and "hau" (yes); whereas in standard Urdu it's "nahi" for no and "haa" for yes.

Though Hyderabadi Urdu or Dakhini are the native languages of the Hyderabadi Muslim people, most people can speak standard Urdu, and often put Urdu as their mother tongue on censuses, as Dakhini is not a recognized language as such. Along with the languages they learn from birth, they can speak Hindi, which is mutually intelligible with standard Urdu, and taught in most Indian schools. Hyderabadi Muslims can also speak the majority languages spoken in the regions they live, namely Telugu, Marathi, and Kannada. The other important characteristic of the natives is cultural refinement in terms of interpersonal communication, referred to as meethi boli (sweet and civilised speech). Tameez, tehzeeb and akhlaq (etiquette, custom, and tradition) are considered very important and guests are treated well with a lot of mehmaan nawaazi (hospitality).

The Qutb Shahs were regarded as the great patrons of Urdu, Persian and Telugu language. The region saw a growth of Deccani Urdu literature, the Deccani Masnavi and Diwan composed during those periods are among the earliest available manuscripts in the Urdu language. The literary work of this region is influenced with the regional Marathi, Telugu, and Kannada in parallel with Arabic and Persian including the adoption of poetic meters and a great quantity of renovated words. The Fifth Sultan of the dynasty, Mohammed Quli Qutb Shah was himself an Urdu poet.

The period of Nizams saw a growth of literary growth since after printing was introduced in Hyderabad. In 1824 AD, the first collection of Urdu Ghazals named Gulzar-e-Mahlaqa (Mahlaqa's garden of flowers) written by Mah Laqa Bai, was printed and published from Hyderabad.

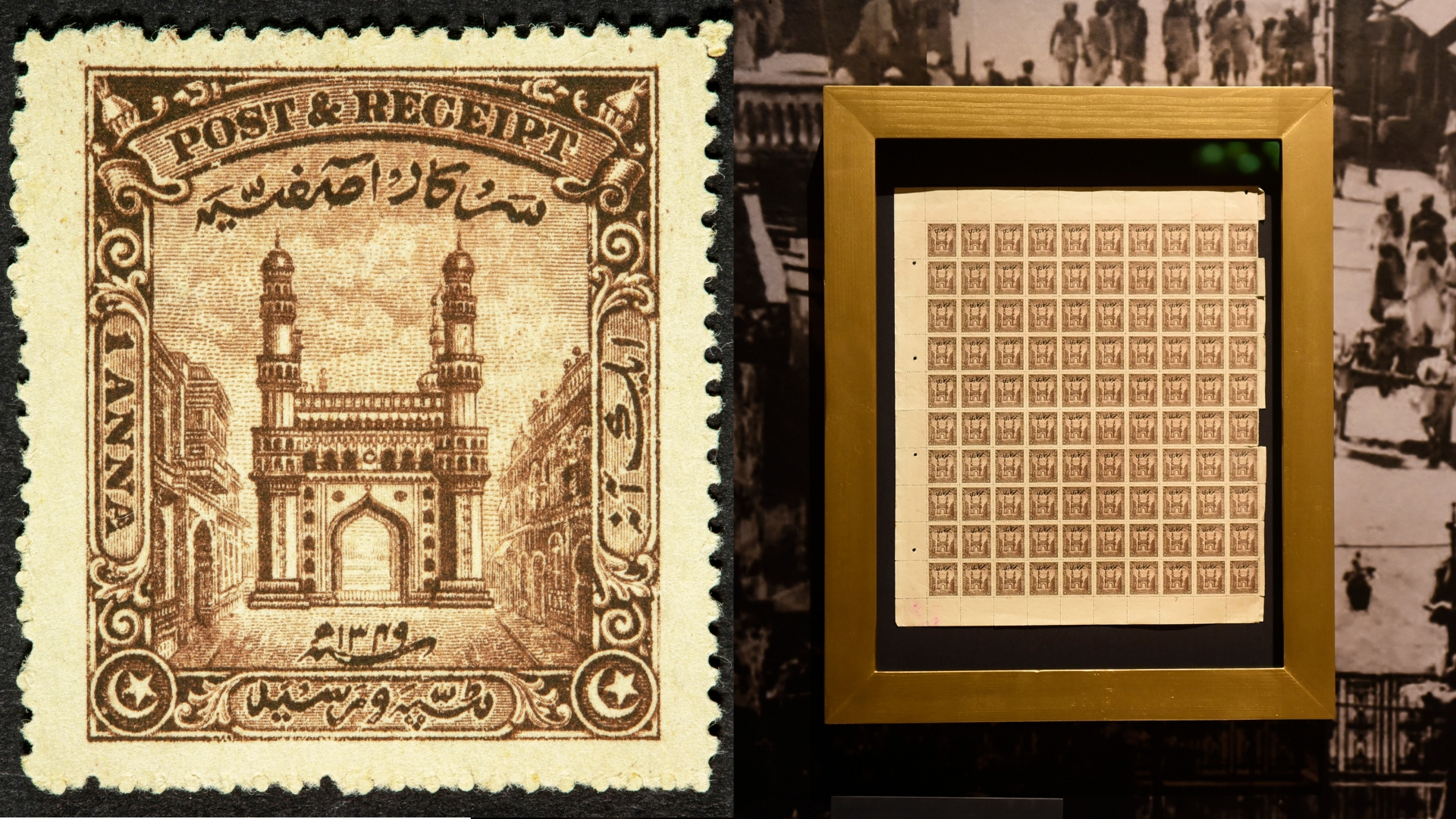
1930-1931 Hyderabad State stamp featuring the Charminar.

After the Revolt of 1857, many Urdu writers, scholars and poets who lost their patronage at Delhi made Hyderabad their home, that grew and brought reforms in the literary and poetry work. Scholars continued to migrate to Hyderabad during the reign of Asaf Jah VI and his successor Asaf Jah VII. These included Shibli Nomani, Dagh Dehlvi, Fani Badayuni, Josh Malihabadi, Ali Haider Tabatabai, Zahir Dehlvi and many others.

The reign of Nizam VII saw many reforms in literary work. For the first time in history the Nizams introduced Urdu as a language of court, administration and education. Other notable poets, scholars and writers of the early 20th century are Amjad Hyderabadi, Makhdoom Mohiuddin, Sayyid Shamsullah Qadri, Mohiuddin Qadri Zore and Sulaiman Areeb. Maharaja Sir Kishen Pershad, although not a Muslim himself, was steeped in Hyderabadi Muslim Culture and wrote poetry under the pen name Shad.

In 2017, Urdu was declared the second official language of Telangana (after Telugu), recognizing the linguistic heritage of Urdu-speaking communities. This move was praised by many, especially Muslims of Hyderabad who spoke Urdu as their mother tongue. But the implementation of Urdu both professional and public spaces has been unorganized and not fully implemented.

Despite these institutional and structural challenges, there are encouraging signs of cultural revival. Youth in Hyderabad are rediscovering Urdu in modern contexts—gathering in heritage venues to share couplets, storytelling, and conversations accompanied by tea, making the language more accessible and dynamic than ever. Institutions like Maulana Azad National Urdu University (MANUU) continue to promote the language through innovations such as e-content platforms, audio-visual series like "Urdu Nama" and "Shaheen‑e‑Urdu," and academic textbook workshops to strengthen Urdu’s role in higher education.

=== Music ===
Though, the once great dance traditions among the Hyderabadi Muslims are almost lost, two distinct, cultural practices are still popular, namely Marfa, and Dholak ke Geet. Marfa was brought by the Siddi and Chaush peoples, of Africa and Yemen, who were deployed in the army of the Nizams. This music, is accompanied by the beating drums of a great tradition, which were once popular in national celebrations of the dissolved Hyderabad state, is still popular among Hyderabadi Muslims in weddings. Dholak ke geet is also one such tradition. Dholak ke geet are songs, that have been orally passed down from generation to generation since the time of the Nizams, and is sung at weddings, accompanied by a Dholak drum.

Qawwali is also popular among the community, and is performed regularly at dargahs such as Dargah Yousufain and Dargah Pahadi Shareef. It used to be patronized by the Nizams as well as the nobility. The great classical musicians such as Bade Ghulam Ali Khan, Inayat Khan, Ustad Tanrus Khan, Munshi Raziuddin and Bahauddin Khan used to perform at the Nizam's court. The contemporary qawwals Ateeq Hussain Khan and the Warsi Brothers reside in Hyderabad and perform regularly in the city.

=== Cuisine ===
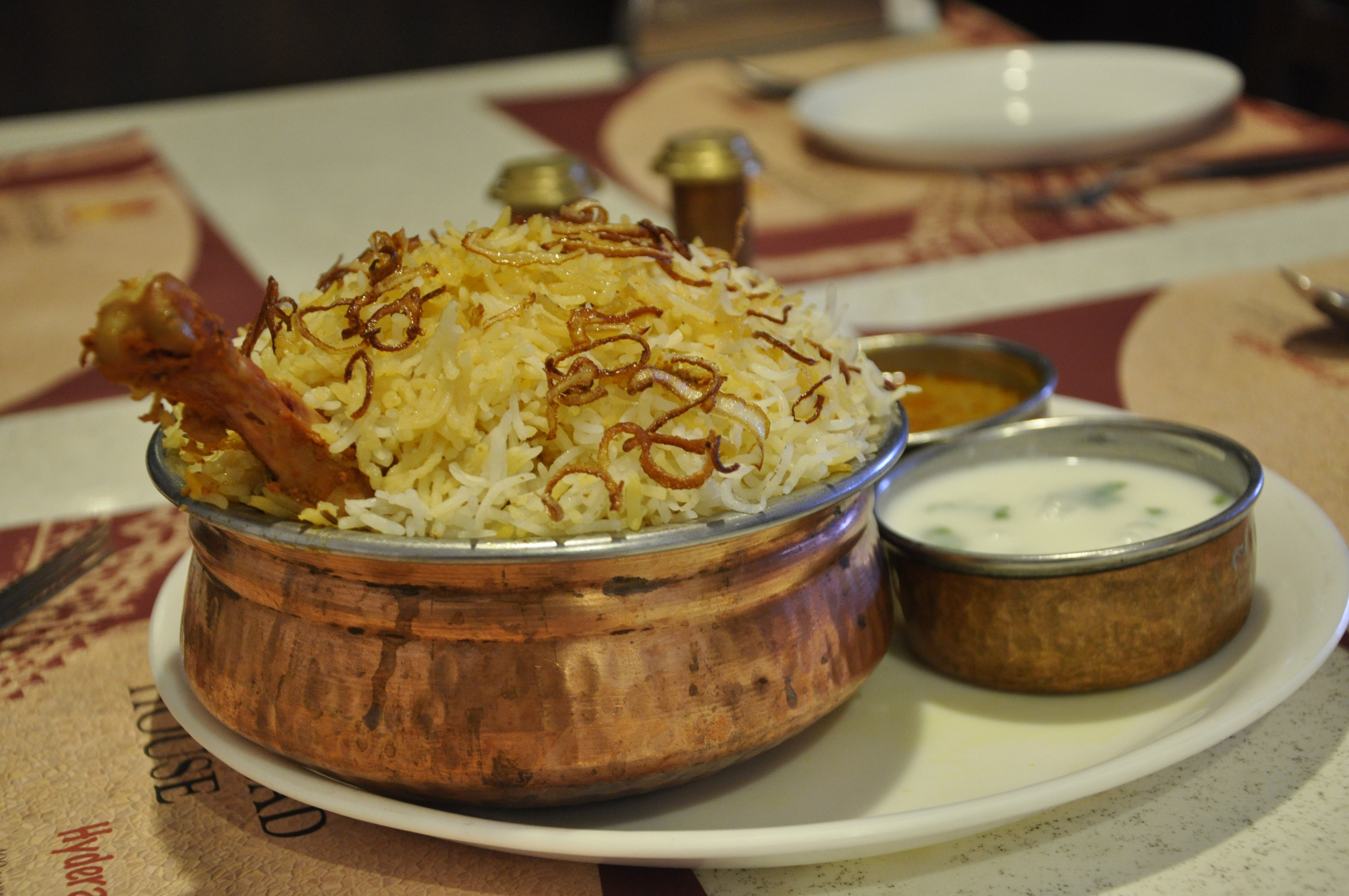
Hyderabadi Biryani

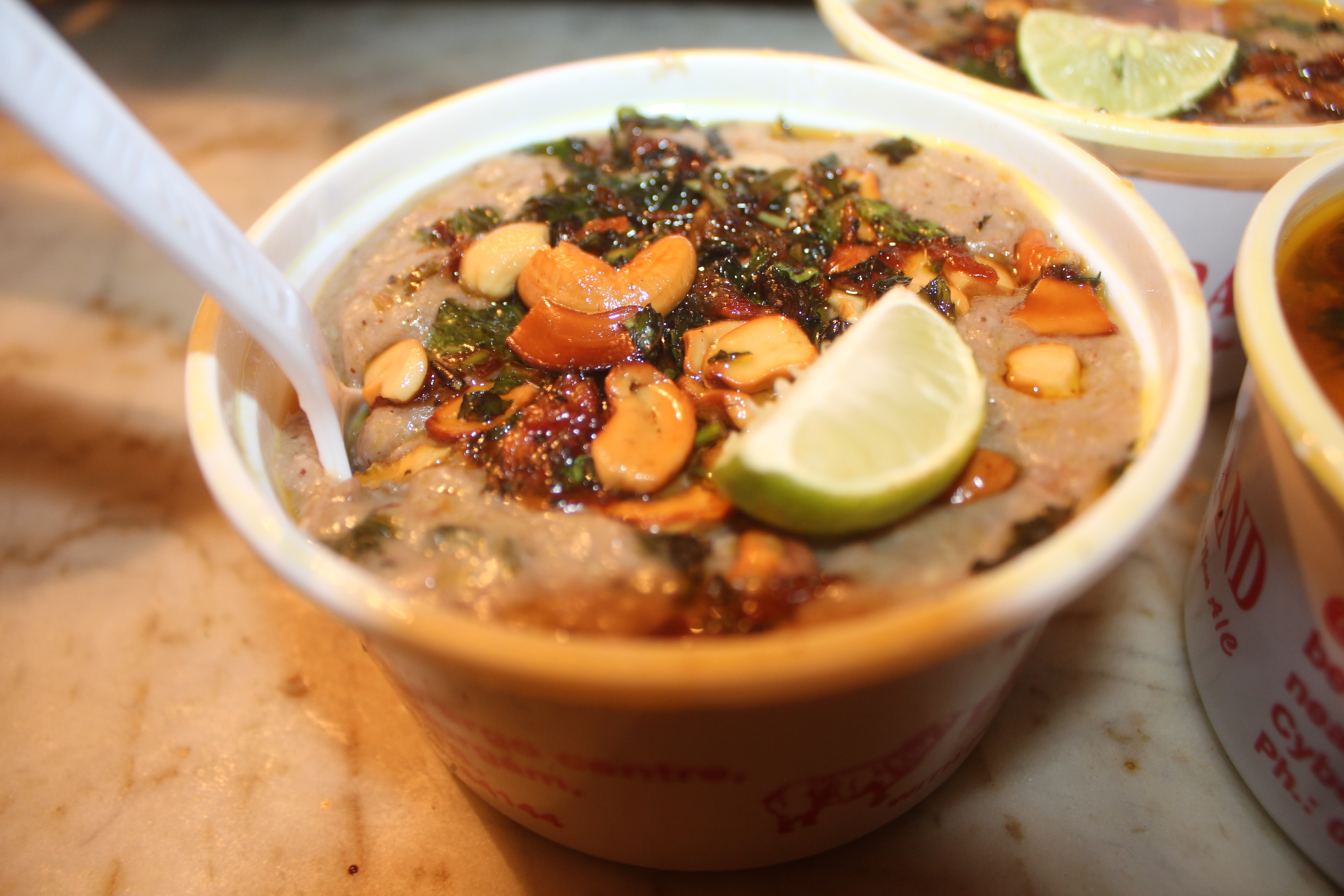
Hyderabadi Haleem

The native cooking style of the community is the Hyderabadi cuisine, which evolved during the Asaf Jahi period. It is heavily influenced by Mughal, Turkish, and Arab along with the influence of the native Telugu and Marathwada cuisines. It comprises a broad repertoire of rice, wheat and meat dishes and the skilled use of various spices, herbs and natural edibles.

Some famous Hyderabadi cuisine (dishes) that are served at weddings are: Hyderabadi Biryani, Haleem, Khubani ka Mitha, Gil-e-Firdaus, Double Ka Meetha, Luqmi, Kaddu ki Kheer (A type of Kheer), Mirchi ka Salan and Baghare Baigan.

Other popular food items are: Chakna, Tamate ka Kut, Khatti Dal, Dalcha, Shirmal, Rawghani Roti, nihari, pasande, Pathar Ka Ghosht, Naan, Dum Ka Murgh, Khagina, Khichdi, Nargisi Kheema, Shaami, Kofte, Tala Hua Ghosht, Poori, Kheer, Sheer Khorma, Til ka Khatta, Til ki Chutney and Qubuli, Shikampur, Tahari, Khichdi. The Arab dishes Mandi and Shawarma are also popular.

The dishes are tied to events, such as Hyderabadi Haleem, made almost exclusively during the month of Ramadan, and Sheer Khorma which is especially made on the day of Eid-ul-Fitr. Talawa Gosht is prepared on Fridays.

Irani chai is enjoyed throughout the city, along with Osmania biscuits. Irani cafes found all over Hyderabad serve these along with lukhmi, samosa and other snacks.

=== Clothing and jewellery ===
==== Khada Dupatta ====
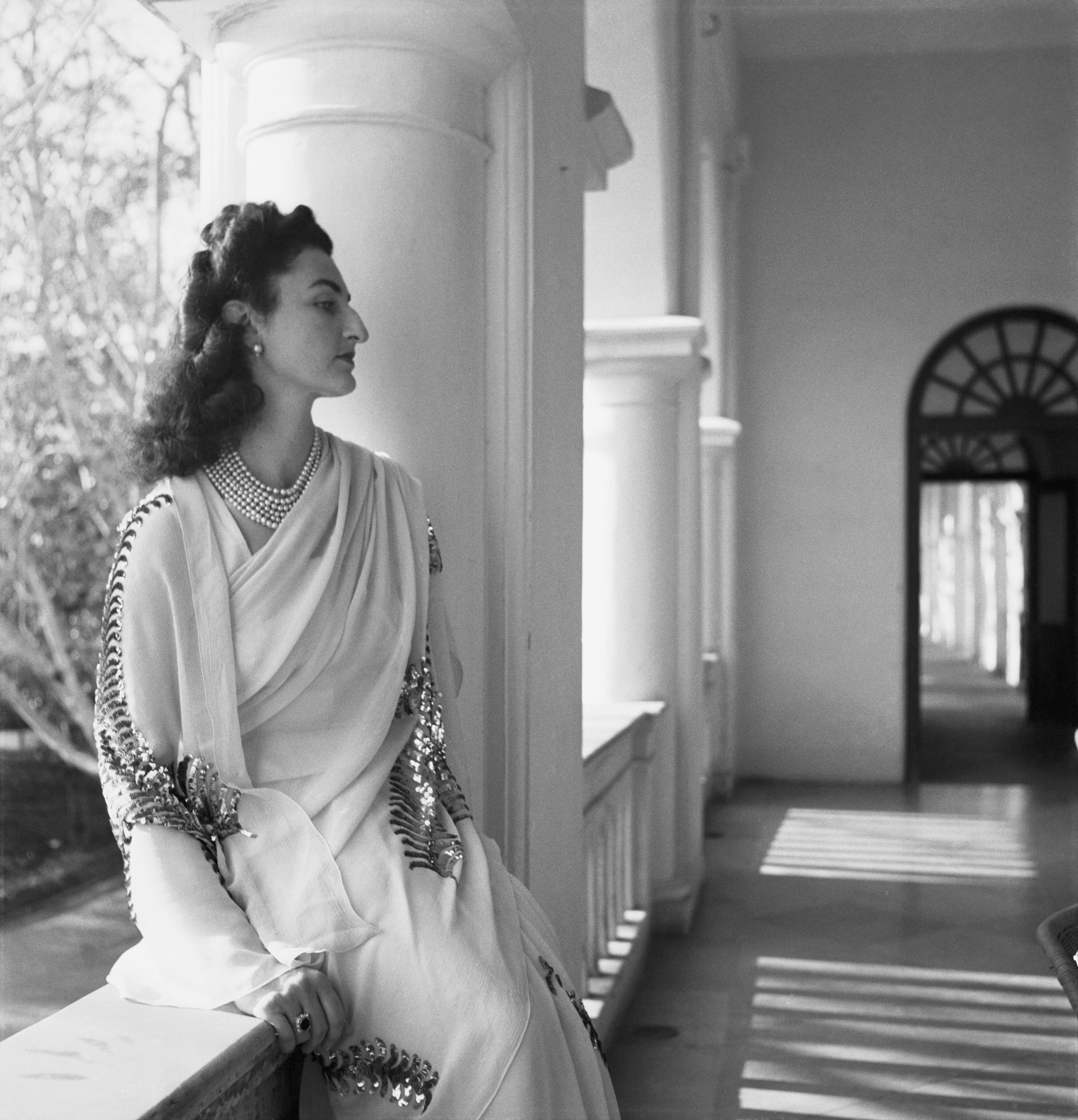
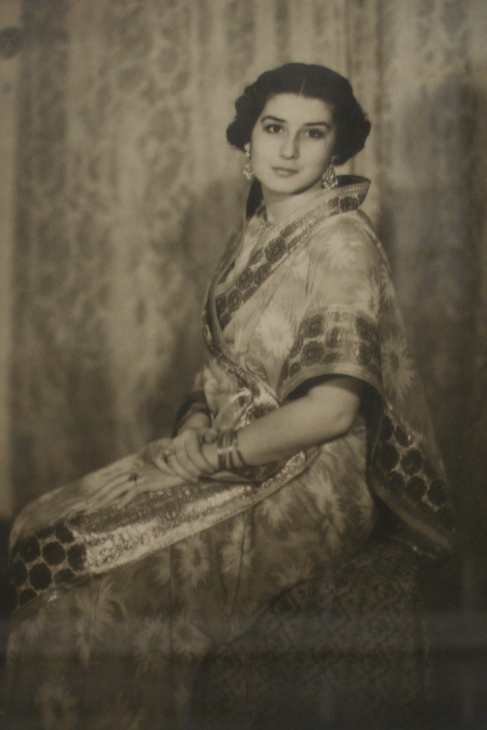
Dürrüşehvar Sultan and her cousin Princess Niloufer, the Hyderabadi princesses of the Ottoman origin.

The Khada Dupatta or Khara Dupatta (uncut veil) is an outfit composed of a kurta (tunic), chooridaar (ruched pair of pants), and 6-yard dupatta (veil) and is traditionally worn by Hyderabad brides. Sometimes the kurta is sleeveless and worn over a koti resembling a choli. The bride also wears a matching ghoonghat (veil) over her head. The accompanying jewellery is:

- Tika (a medallion of uncut diamonds worn on the forehead and suspended by a string of pearls)
- Jhoomar (a fan shaped ornament worn on the side of the head)
- Nath (a nose ring with a large ruby bead flanked by two pearls)
- Chintaak also known as Jadaoo Zevar (a choker studded with uncut diamonds and precious stones)
- Kan phool (earrings that match the Chintaak and consist of a flower motif covering the ear lobe and a bell shaped ornament that is suspended from the flower. The weight of precious stones and gold in the Karan phool is held up by sahare or supports made of strands of pearls that are fastened into the wearers hair.)
- Satlada (neck ornament of seven strands of pearls set with emeralds, diamonds and rubies)
- Ranihaar (neck ornament of pearls with a wide pendant)
- Jugni (neck ornament of several strands of pearls with a central pendant)
- Gote (Shellac bangles studded with rhinestones and worn with gold coloured glass bangles called sonabai)
- Payal (ankle bracelets)
- Gintiyan (toe rings)
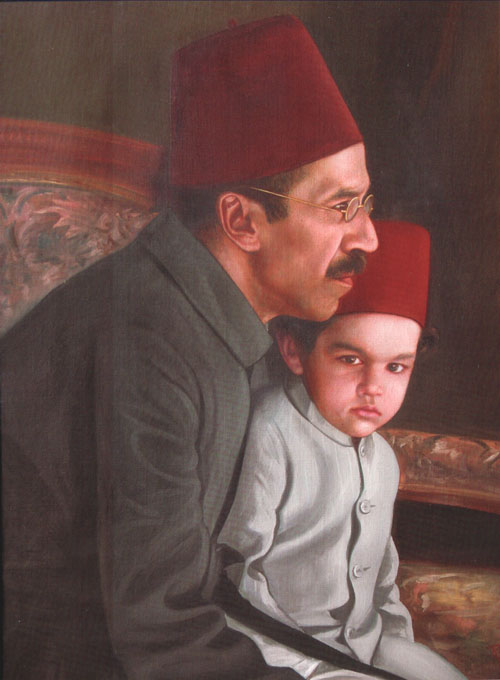
  Asaf Jah VII with his grandson Mukarram Jah, both wearing a Sherwani and Rumi Topi

==== Sherwani ====
The Sherwani is the traditional men's garb of Hyderabad. It is a coat-like tunic with a tight-fitting collar (hook & eyelet fastening), close-fitting in the upper torso and flaring somewhat in its lower half. It usually has six or seven buttons, often removable ones made from gold sovereigns for special occasions. The material is usually silk or wool. A groom may use gold brocade for his wedding sherwani, but otherwise good taste dictates understated colors, albeit with rich and textured fabrics. The sherwani is usually worn over a silk or cotton kurta (long shirt) and pyjamas (baggy pants with a drawstring at the waist).

The Sherwani is closely associated with Hyderabad, although it has spread since to the rest of India and to Pakistan. Former Prime Minister of India Jawaharlal Nehru adapted its design and turned it into his trademark Nehru Jacket, further popularizing the garment.

==== Attar ====
Attar, or Ittar is a traditional perfume made from botanical sources. It is still available in the bazaars near Charminar and at the Moazam Jahi Market. Many of the older generations still prefer attar over modern perfumes.

== Religion ==
The majority of Hyderabadi Muslims are Sunni Muslims with Sufi influences and the minority is Twelver Shia and Ismaili. Sunni Muslims mostly follow the Hanafi jurisprudence. Islam in Hyderabad, with historical patronizing by the rulers, has a strong Sufi influence. Tablighi Jamaat has also been active since the late 1950s, with its headquarters at Jama Masjid Mallepally. Salafi movement within Sunni Islam is also influential in some areas. Bismillah ceremony is an Islam initiation ceremony held for children, unique to the region.

Shia Islam is followed by 10% of Hyderabad's population. Mourning of Muharram is observed by the Shia minority. Processions are held every year and are attended by both Shia and Sunni Muslims, since the time of the Qutb Shahi dynasty as well as the Nizams. Though Asaf Jahs (Nizams), rulers of erstwhile Hyderabad State, were Sunni Muslims, they continued to patronise the observance of Muharram. It was during their time that special colonies for Shias were built in Darulshifa and surrounding areas. It was during the Asaf Jahi period that several ashurkhanas were built. There is a small population of Ahmadiyya Muslim population numbering about 4,000 members.

Religious knowledge and its propagation flourished historically for Muslims under the Nizams, notably through institutions like the world-famous Jamia Nizamia, which became a key center of Islamic scholarship in India, housing thousands of manuscripts and producing significant scholarly works under the patronage of the Nizams. In present-day Hyderabad, this legacy continues through several contemporary Islamic educational institutions. In particular The Department of Islamic Studies at Maulana Azad National Urdu University (MANUU), established in 2012, offers postgraduate M.A., Ph.D., and diploma programs in Islamic Studies from a modern academic perspective.

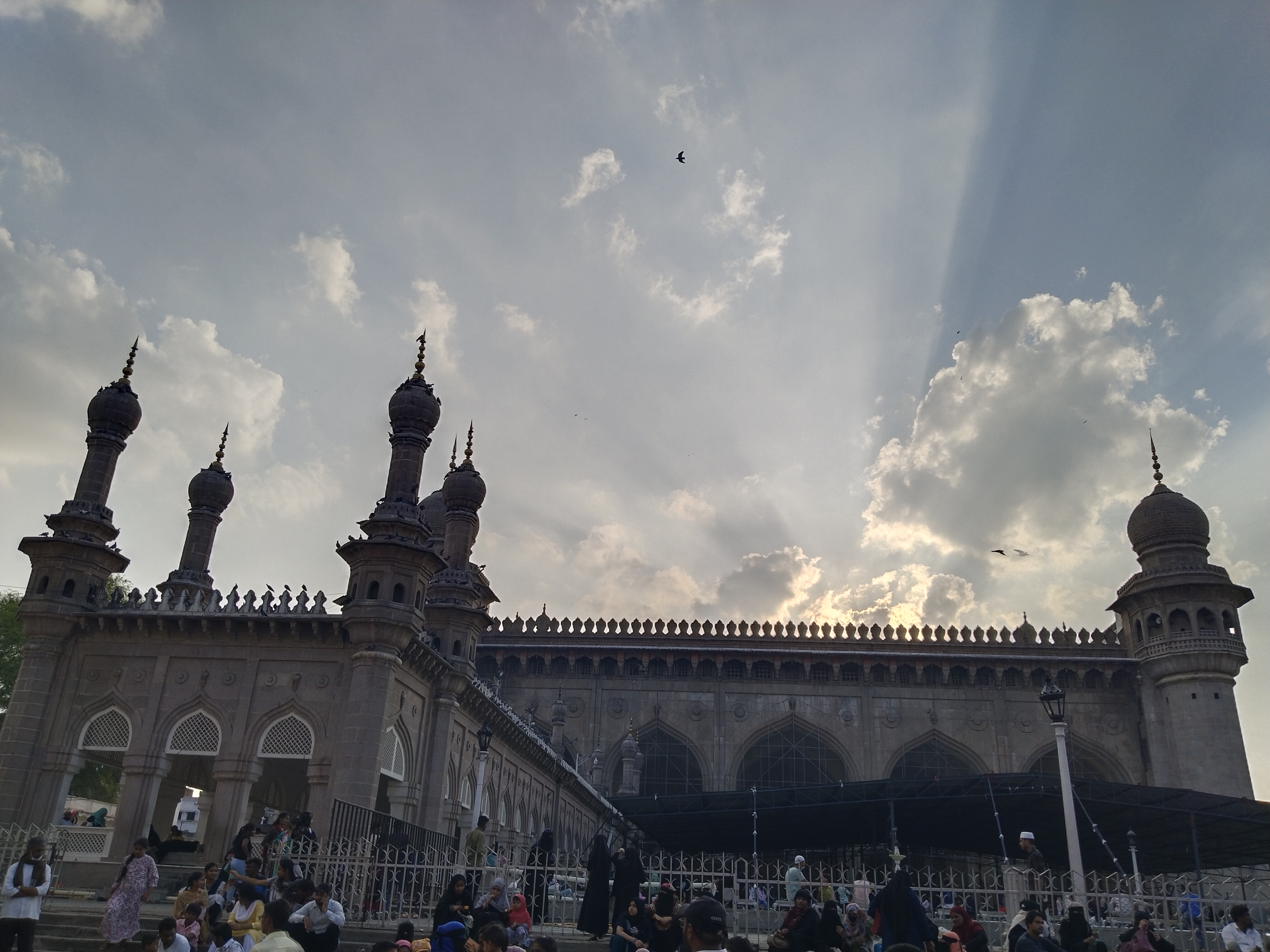
The 400-year-old Mecca Masjid in Hyderabad

The largest mosque in Hyderabad, the Makkah Masjid, continues to draw congregations of over two hundred thousand during Eid prayers and Jumu‘at-al-Wida (the last Friday of Ramadan), symbolizing the enduring legacy of the Nizam era’s religious architecture.

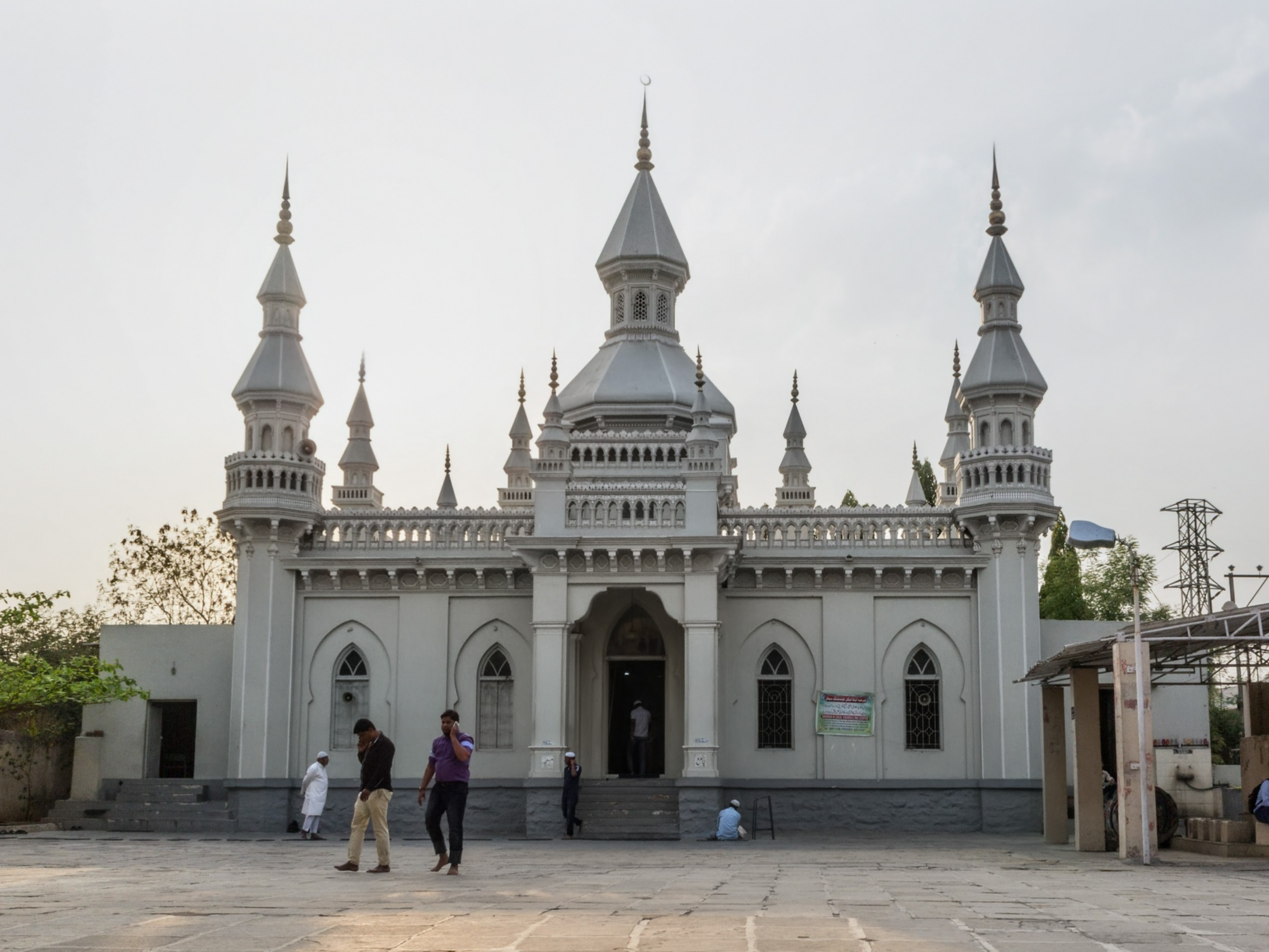
Spanish Mosque - Hyderabad

In addition to Makkah Masjid, other important mosques built during the Nizams’ rule include the Shahi Masjid (completed in 1933), commissioned by Mir Osman Ali Khan as the royal mosque, and the Afzal Gunj Masjid, built in 1866 by the fifth Nizam, Afzal-ud-Daulah. Finally, the unique Spanish Mosque in Begumpet, built by the Paigah noble family, also reflects the period’s rich cultural influences.

Hyderabad, as of mid-2025, hosts approximately 2,778 mosques, representing about 1.26% of all mosques in India—a substantial concentration for a single metropolitan area

Hyderabad has produced many renowned religious scholars representing different Islamic sects and trends, including Bahadur Yar Jung, Muhammad Hamidullah, Hashim Amir Ali, Sayyid Shamsullah Qadri, Sayyid Ahmedullah Qadri, Abul Ala Maududi, Hameeduddin Aquil Husami and M. A. Muqtedar Khan.

== Historical & Present Day Political Engagement ==
The political engagement of Hyderabadi Muslims stretches back centuries evolving through distinct historical phases, each shaped by the shifting power dynamics of the Deccan region, the subcontinent, and the wider colonial and postcolonial world.

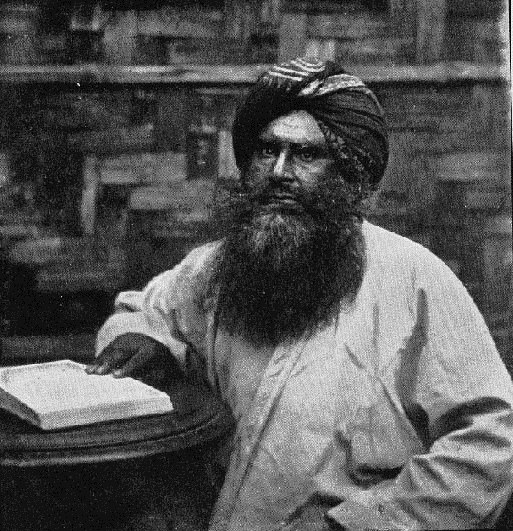
Undated image of Maulvi Allauddin from the records of the Cellular Jail

Hyderabadi Muslims actively participated in anti-colonial resistance well before the Partition, playing significant roles in uprisings and political movements against British rule. During the 1857 Rebellion, leaders such as Maulvi Allauddin and Turrebaz Khan emerged as prominent figures — Maulvi Allauddin led prayers at the Makkah Masjid that turned into open revolt, while Turrebaz Khan became a local hero for leading attacks against British forces in Hyderabad, eventually being martyred in the struggle.

In the decades that followed, Hyderabadi Muslims continued to resist colonial authority through both religious and political mobilization. The Khilafat Movement (1919–1924), which aimed to protect the Ottoman Caliphate and oppose British imperialism, saw strong support from Hyderabad's Muslim clerics and intelligentsia. Additionally, Makhdoom Mohiuddin, a poet and Marxist activist from Hyderabad, played a key role in organizing the working class and peasants against both the British and the feudal Nizam state in the 1930s and 40s, helping lay the foundation for leftist resistance through the Andhra Mahasabha. These actions reflected a broader pattern of engagement by Hyderabadi Muslims in both religious and secular movements against British colonial domination long before the subcontinent's eventual partition.

Map of Partition on India (1947)

During the Partition era, Hyderabadi Muslims were politically active across a wide spectrum — figures like Moin Nawaz Jung and Nawab Mir Laik Ali supported the idea of an independent Hyderabad and resisted integration with India; leaders such as Bahadur Yar Jung and Qasim Rizvi, head of the Razakars, were vocal proponents of accession to Pakistan; communist organizers like Makhdoom Mohiuddin and Raj Bahadur Gour (though the latter was Hindu, he was a prominent communist ally in Hyderabad's leftist circles) mobilized workers and peasants against the Nizam’s autocracy; while individuals like Shoebullah Khan, a journalist tragically assassinated for his views, strongly advocated integration with the newly formed Indian Union.

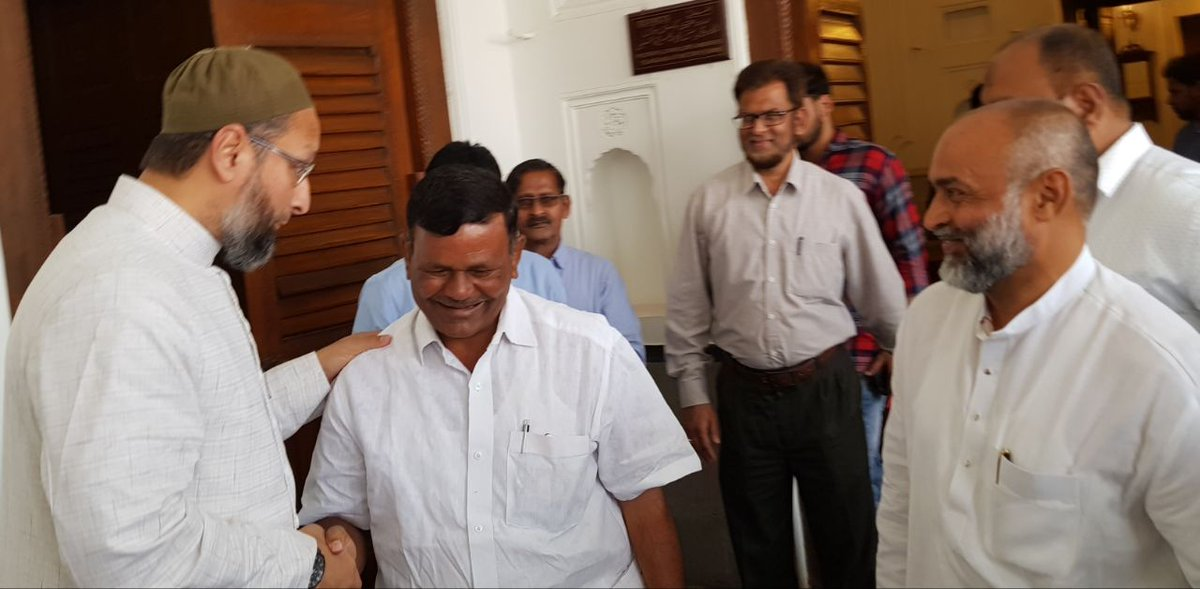
Asaduddin Owaisi with constituents

Today, Hyderabad is one of the few Indian cities where Muslim political leadership is institutionally entrenched. The All India Majlis-e-Ittehadul Muslimeen (AIMIM), currently led by Asaduddin Owaisi, dominates politics in Hyderabad’s Old City, consistently winning seats in the Lok Sabha (Lower House of Parliament) and the Telangana Legislative Assembly. The party claims to represent the interests of Muslims by campaigning for greater protection of minority rights across the country. A rival breakaway faction of the AIMIM is the Majlis Bachao Tehreek (MBT), headed by Majeed Ullah Khan Farhat and his more prominent younger brother Amjed Ullah Khan, which also claims to represent the interests of Hyderabad’s Muslim population.

Meanwhile, in the newer parts of the city, particularly in constituencies with more mixed demographics, voters tend to prefer the Bharat Rashtra Samithi (formerly Telangana Rashtra Samithi or TRS). Within the BRS, Mohammed Mahmood Ali, who has served as the Deputy Chief Minister of Telangana and formerly held the Home Ministry portfolio, is one of the most influential Muslim leaders in the state. He plays a key role in the party’s outreach to the Muslim community across Telangana. In the Indian National Congress, Mohd Feroz Khan, a former MLA candidate from Nampally, and Mohammed Ali Shabbir, a senior Congress leader and former Minister, have long been prominent Muslim faces of the party in Hyderabad and Telangana, known for advocating minority welfare and communal harmony.

== See also ==
- Andhra Muslims
- Islam in India
- Deccani language
- Deccanis
- Annexation of Hyderabad
