= Tasmia Qwani =

Tasmia Qwani or Tasmiya Khwani also known as Bismillah is a centuries old traditional Deccani muslim family ceremony in which a Muslim child is initiated to read the Quran. The ceremony is celebrated with multiple traditional customs.

After a Muslim child grows to the age of four years and four months the traditional Bismillah ceremony is performed in which, any elder person from the family or a religious head from the community make the child to recite the first five verses from Surath Al-Alaq—(96th Chapter of the Quran), and from then on wards the child is regularly taught to learn the Quran.

The ceremony is celebrated on any convenient day with relatives, neighbors and friends, on the ceremony day early morning Naubat—(drummer and shehnai players are placed on a small podium) is played outside the house, in the evening ladies play Dholak ke geet— (household songs based on local Folklore) in a family gathering, later the child is prepared to get ready for function and this preparation is called Haldi—(Turmeric and Sandalwood paste is applied on the body for fragrance) before shower, female child’s hands and foot are decorated with Henna fortnight of ceremony, the male garb is Sherwani and female is Khara Dupatta and Gajra. Once all the relatives arrived, particularly after Isha prayer—(Late night 5th and last prayer of the Day) the child is set to recite the verses of the Quran after which the relatives congratulates the parents and present gifts and flower garlands to the child and parents. The traditional Marfa Music is played followed with sword dance by the youngsters.
