= Weddings in India =

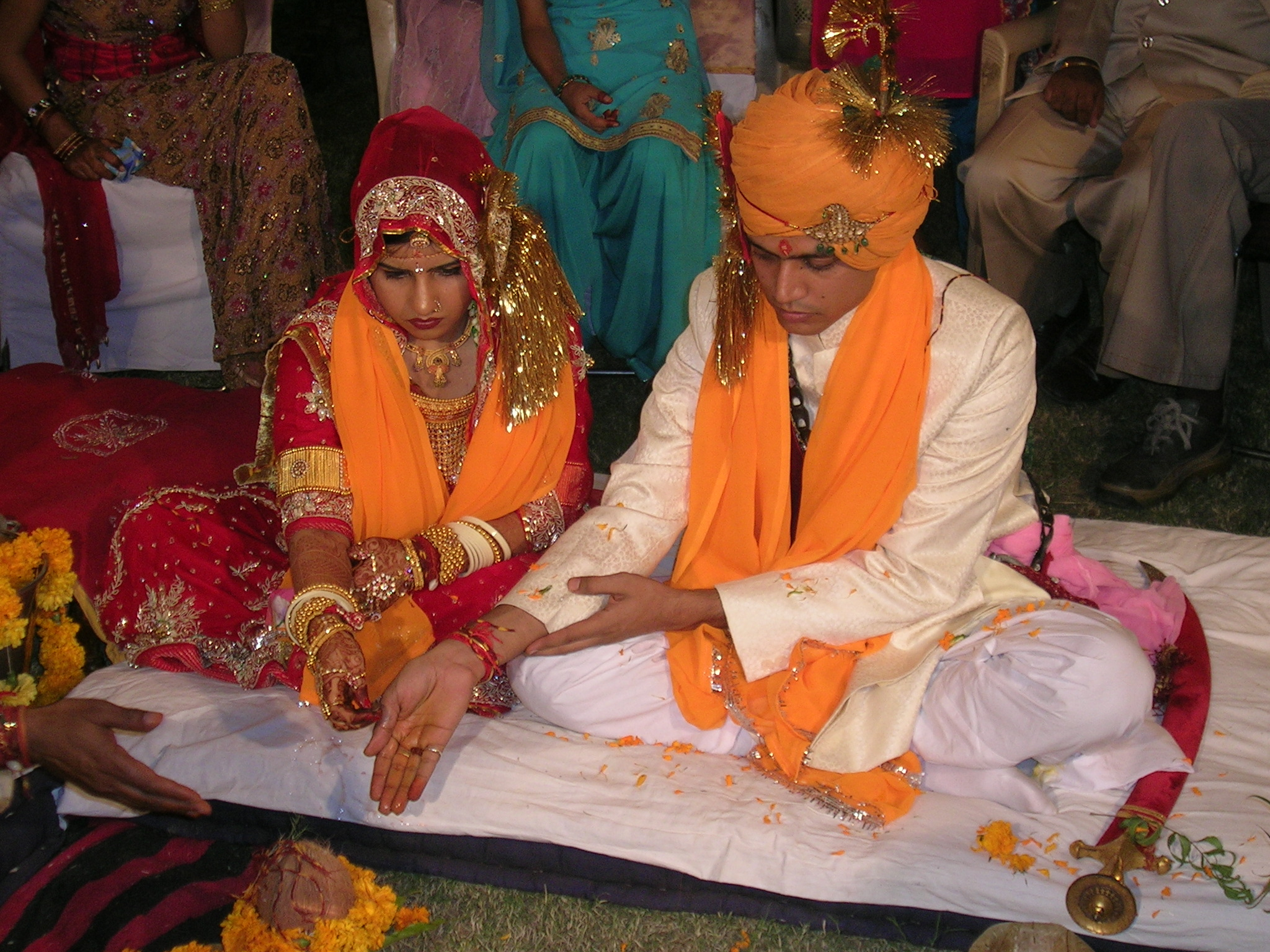
Hindu marriage ceremony

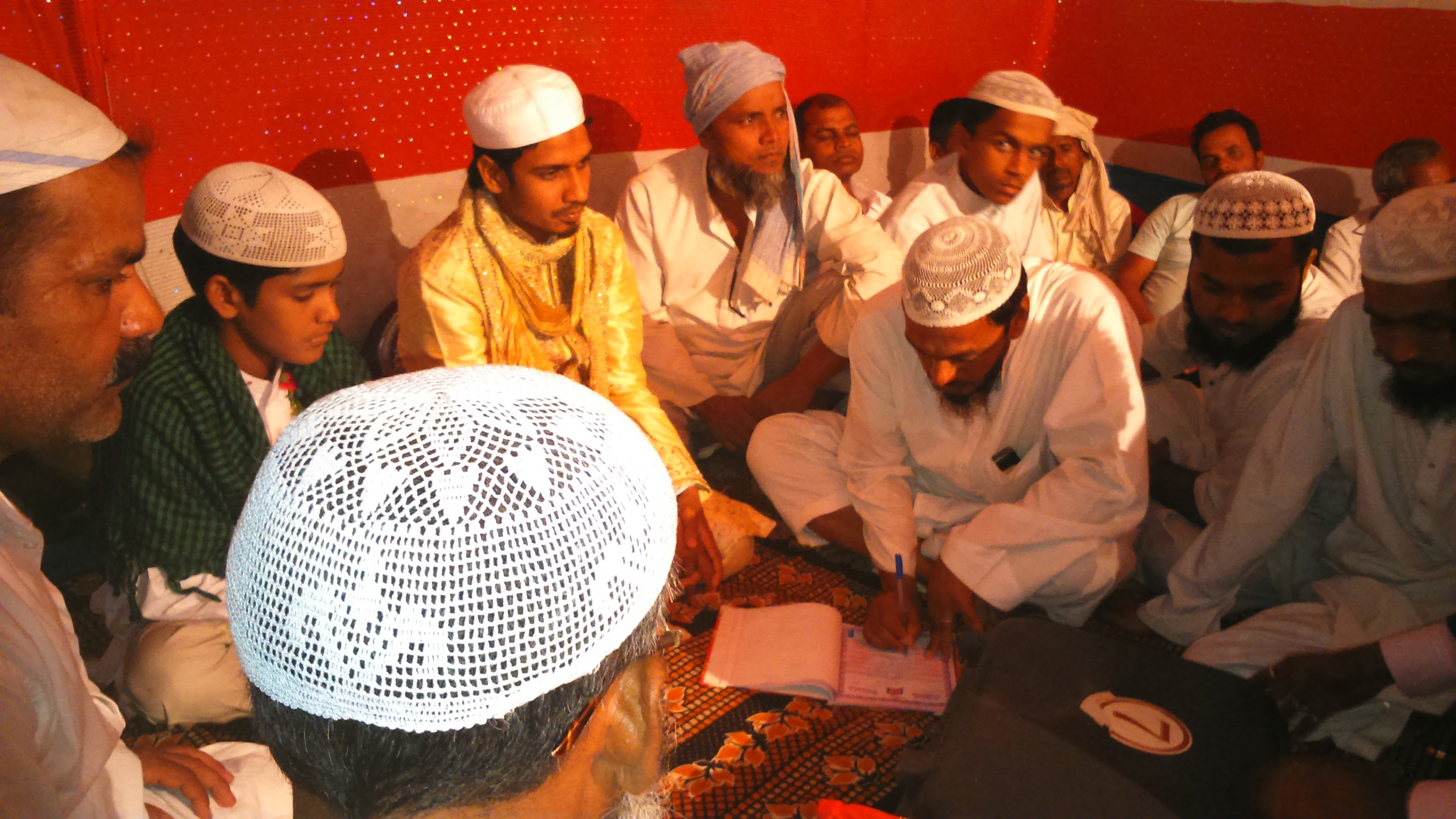
A Muslim wedding ceremony

Weddings in India are festive occasions and usually celebrated with extensive decorations, color, music, dance, outfits and rituals that depend on the community, region and religion of the bride and the groom, as well as their preferences. India celebrates about 10 million weddings per year, of which about 80% are Hindu weddings. Approximately 90% of marriages in India are still arranged. Despite the rising popularity of love marriages, especially among younger generations, arranged marriages continue to be the predominant method for finding a marriage partner in India.

A daughter's marriage can often be the most costly event in the life of an Indian family, with some estimate indicating that families spend more than six times a family's annual income on the wedding. Most of these costs go towards dowries and the wedding celebration. Scholars have characterized these expenditures as being strongly shaped by social norms and by desires to signal social status.

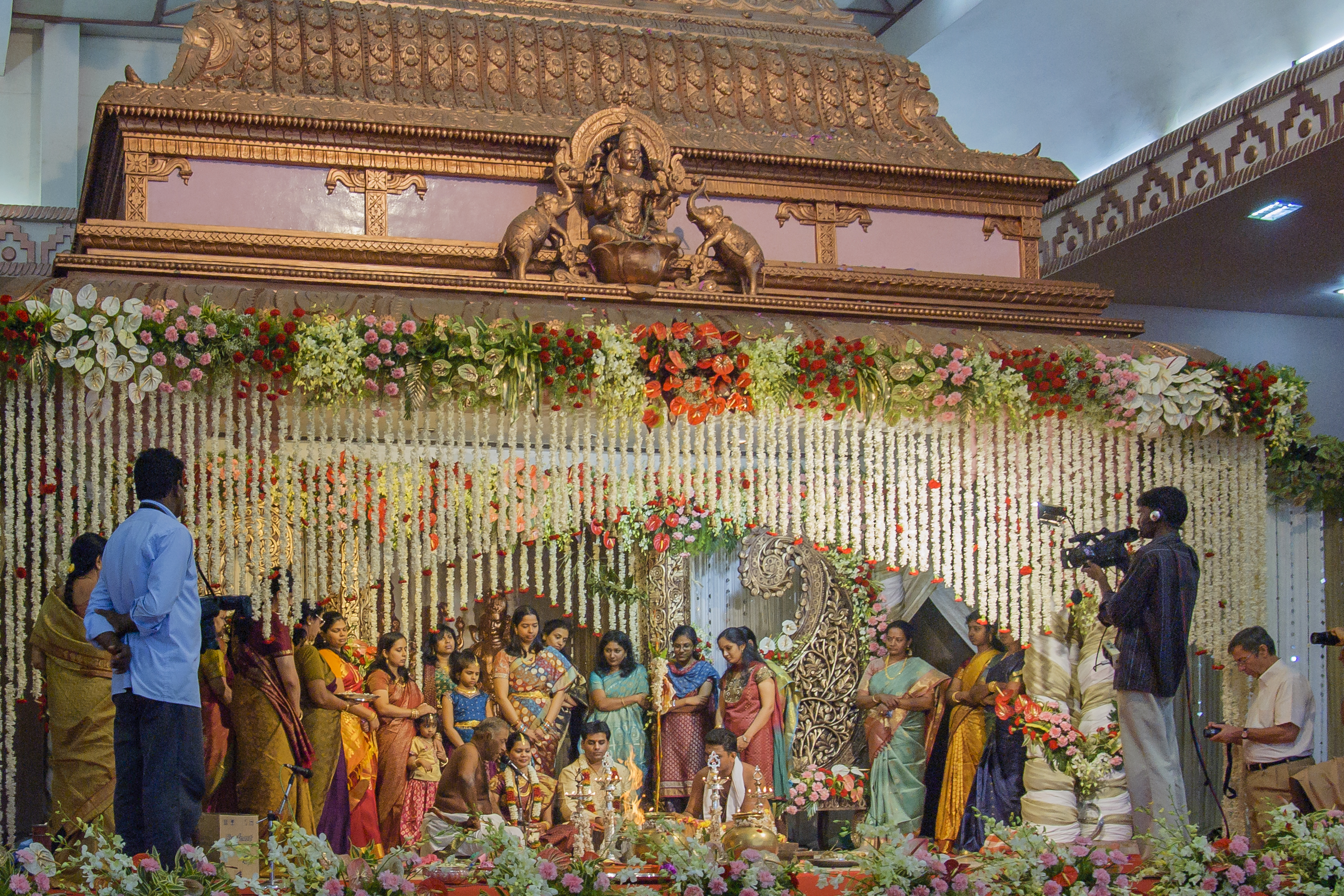
An Indian wedding taking place in Puducherry

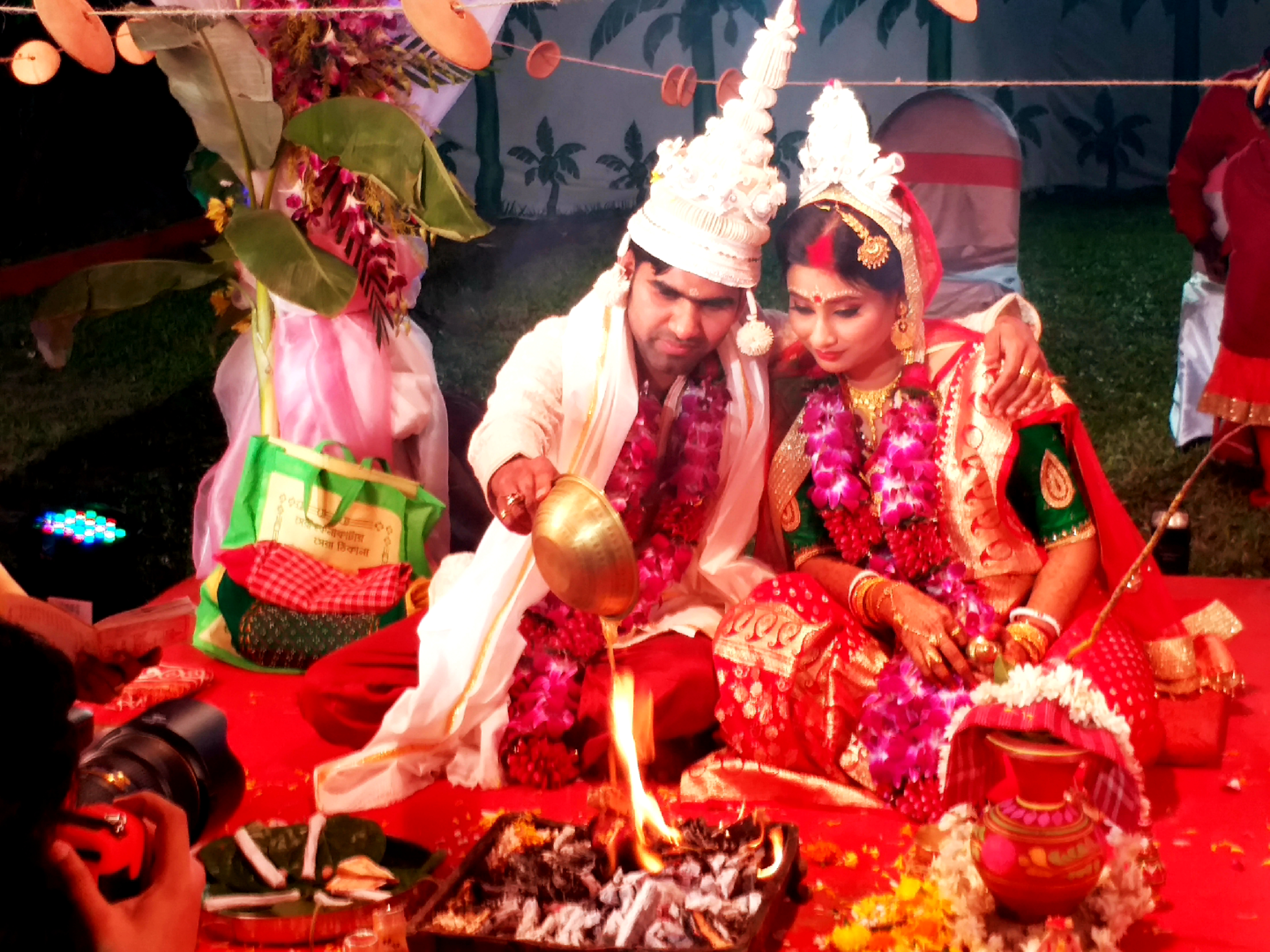
Bengali Hindu wedding in Kolkata

== Ceremonies in Hinduism ==
While there are many festival-related rituals in Hinduism, vivaah (wedding) is the most extensive personal ritual a Hindu undertakes in his or her life. Typical Hindu families spend significant effort and financial resources to prepare and celebrate weddings. The rituals and process of a Hindu wedding vary depending on the region of India, local adaptations, resources of the family and preferences of the bride and the groom. Nevertheless, there are a few key rituals common in Hindu weddings – Kanyadaan, Panigrahana, and Saptapadi; these are respectively, giving away of daughter by the father, voluntarily holding hand near the fire to signify impending union, and taking seven steps before fire with each step including a set of mutual vows. After the seventh step and vows of Saptapadi, the couple is legally husband and wife. Jain and Buddhist weddings in India, share many themes, but are centered around their respective religious ideas and texts.

== Other religions ==
Indian Sikh marriages are conducted through a ceremony called Anand Karaj. The couple walk around the respective holy scripture, the Guru Granth Sahib, four times, and then perform the Ardās prayer & praise.

Indian Muslims celebrate a traditional Islamic wedding, with rituals including Nikah, payment of financial dower called Mahr by the groom to the bride, signing of marriage contract, and a reception.

Indian Christian weddings follow Christian marriage customs and values. Among Protestants in India, the betrothal rite celebrates the engagement of a couple, with prayers being offered for the couple and engagement rings being blest by a pastor. Among North Indian Christians, a day before the wedding, the Haldi/ Ubtan/ Mayun ceremony happens; in which turmeric paste is applied on the bride-to-be and groom-to-be. Among Goan Christians and South Canarese Christians the Roce ceremony is held, in which coconut paste is applied on the bride-to-be and groom-to-be. Among the Bombay East Indian Christians, the Umbracho Pani ceremony is held, a day before the wedding, in which water drawn from a well is used to bathe by the bride-to-be and groom-to-be. On the wedding day, the couple meet in the presence of a priest at a church. Passages from the Bible are read out. The bride and groom take their marriage vows. The bride and groom then exchange wedding rings, symbolising their love for each other.

Interfaith marriages in India, especially between Hindus and Muslims, have been the subject of legal constraints in some states, vigilante harassment, and fears of violence.

== Marriage age ==
In the past, the age of marriage was young, often childhood or early teenage. The legal age of marriage is 21 for males and 18 for females. However, the average age of marriage varies, with males typically marrying between 23 and 28 years of age and females between 20 and 25 years of age. Arranged marriages have long been the norm in Indian society. Even today, the majority of Indians have their marriages planned by their parents and other elder family members. Recent studies suggest that Indian culture is trending away from traditional arranged marriages. Fewer marriages are purely arranged without consent and that the majority of surveyed Indian marriages are arranged with consent. The percentage of self-arranged marriages (called love marriages in India) have also increased vastly, particularly in the urban areas of India such as Mumbai and Delhi.

== Wedding industry ==
Weddings are a major business in India. According to a report by KPMG in 2017, the Indian wedding industry is estimated to be around $40–50 billion. It is the second largest wedding market after the United States, which is at $70 billion. While the industry is very unorganised with small and medium scale businesses, there are also corporate entities who are trying to tap this industry. The prime factors for growth in the industry are the rise of middle class in India, an overall booming economy and use of social media. It is estimated that the cost of an Indian wedding ranges from ₹500,000 and ₹50 million (from US$6,747.14 to US$674,743.50). Indians are likely to spend one-fifth of their total lifetime wealth on a wedding.

=== Destination weddings ===
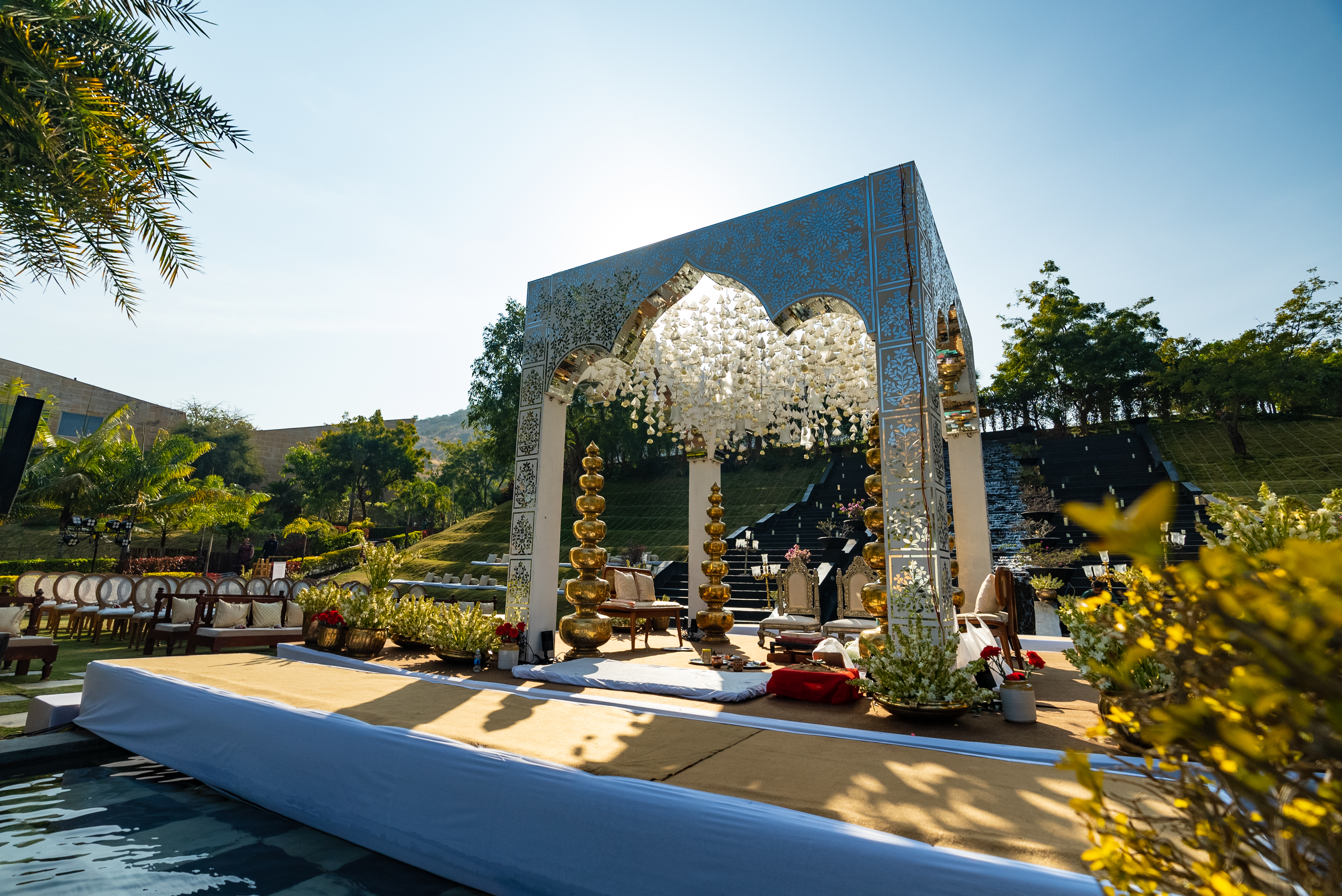
Wedding mandap for Hindu ceremony. This is made by local artisans in Rajasthan by using a technique called thikri.

Many Indian celebrities choose destination weddings, and the masses take inspiration from them. Both domestic and international destinations are popular for weddings in India. The destination wedding industry in India was estimated to cross ₹450 billion in 2020.

=== Wedding photography ===
Pre-wedding shoots along with wedding photography have also become a big stake in Indian weddings. Average wedding shoots can cost from ₹15,000 to ₹100,000 per day.

== See also ==
- Hindu wedding
- Hindu Marriage Act, 1955
- Muslim personal law
- The Indian Christian Marriage Act, 1872
- Dowry system in India
- Dowry of Catherine De Braganza
- Indian wedding clothes
- Interfaith marriage
- White wedding (Christian)
- Islamic marital practices
- Sakharpuda
