= Clothing of Hyderabad, India =

The traditional clothing of Hyderabad, India has both Muslim and South Asian influences. Men wear sherwani and kurta–paijama and women wear khara dupatta Halfsaree, silksaree,, halfsaree, and pattusaree.

Most Muslim women wear burqa and hijab outdoors. Western-style clothing is increasingly common among younger people.

== Men's wear ==
- Sherwani
- Kurta–paijama / Churidar
- Lungi

== Women's wear ==
- Silk Sarees
- Langa voni
- Gaagra Choli
- Khada dupatta
- Shalwar kameez
