= Marfa (music) =

Form of Indian celebratory music

Marfa is a form of celebratory rhythmic music and dance among the Hyderabadi Muslims in the Deccan region adapted from Afro-Arab music of Hadhramawt in Yemen. It is played at a high tempo using instruments such as marfa, daff, dhol, sticks, steel pots and wooden strips called thapi. The chorus effects and vocal meter are set according to beats.

It was introduced during 18th century in Hyderabad State by the East African Siddi community, who used to serve as cavalry guards in Asaf Jahi Nizams' irregular army. The Asaf Jahi Nizams patronized marfa music and it was performed during official celebrations and ceremonies as they also claimed Arab ancestry from the first Caliph Abu Bakr Siddique through the Bayafandi Clan of Asir province in Arabia. It became popular in India, particularly in Hyderabad state. It was brought there by the diaspora of Siddis and Hadhramis.

The associated marfa dance is typically performed with janbiya daggers and/or talwars (swords) and latts (canes), and it is likely to have been derived from the Bar'a (Arabic: برع) dance of Yemen.

== Origin ==
Marfa is a Yemeni Arabic word used for the kettledrum. Due to the Hadhrami people's influence on the culture of the Ethiopian Siddis, the word marfa became a symbol of the music played using the kettledrum. Kettledrums are replaced with Handi kettledrums in the Siddi form of marfa music played in Hyderabad, India.

== Forms ==
Marfa music is created from three different musical rhythmic beats also called teen maar taal. A typical dance involves jiggling with swords and sticks based on the music's tempo and rhythm. The music is performed only by men, whereas dances and jiggling are common among both men and women. Popular marfa rhythms include:

- sewariʿarabī
- bamb sheklahʿarabī
- ya abu bakar-ya abu salahʿarabī
- salaam almukallahʿarabī
- jumbali zimbaliʿarabī
- benazeer benazeerʿarabī
- ahlan wasahlanʿarabī

== Popularity ==
Playing marfa has become popular in Hyderabad and it is considered a traditional sign of welcome. Since 1951, it is performed officially by the government of India as part of the annual celebration on the occasions of Independence Day and Republic Day at Red Fort, New Delhi, India. It is also played at Hyderabadi Muslim weddings, with great fervour.

== See also ==
- Marfa (instrument)
- Hyderabadi Muslim
- Chaush
