= Tamate ka kut =

Indian tomato dish

- Course: Main
- Place of origin: Hyderabad Deccan
- Region or state: Deccan
- Main ingredients: Tomatoes

Tamate ka kut (tamate is the plural of tomato) is a Hyderabadi dish of Hyderabadi origin. It is popular among Hyderabadi Muslims and part of a vast and rich Hyderabadi cuisine.
