= Marfa (instrument) =

Percussion instrument
- Classification: Percussion instrument

Related instruments
- Timki

Marfa (Arabic: مرفع, Urdu: مرفع) is a single hemispherical drum or percussion instrument. It may have originated in Africa.

== See also ==
- Marfa Music
