= Chaush =

Indian Muslim community of Arab origin

The Chaush or Chaus are a community of Hadhrami Arab descent found in the Deccan region of India.

The Chaush or Chaus were brought from Yemen to work in the former Hyderabad State as military men for the Nizams. It is said that especially when it came to safe guarding his family, the 7th Nizam had absolute trust on these Arab Soldiers. They are most concentrated in Marathwada, Telangana and Hyderabad-Karnataka regions, and most of their population is concentrated in the neighbourhoods of Barkas, King Kothi in Hyderabad, Shasha Mahallah in Karimnagar, Al-Tamash in Aurangabad,Old Jalna in Jalna. They also live in Nanded,Parbhani,Beed,Latur,Adilabad, Asifabad, Kagaznagar, Nizamabad, Mahabubnagar and Warangal.

== Cuisine ==
The Hyderabadi haleem, marag (mutton stew), murtabaq, shorba, harira, mandi, kabsa, maqluba, tas kabab, lukhmi, sheer khurma, qubani ka meetha, Aseed and malida have been introduced in Hyderabad by the Chaush or Arabs.

== See also ==
- Barkas
- King Kothi
- Purani Haveli
- Shasha Mahallah
- Chiaus
- Hyderabadi Pahalwan
- Siddi
