= Indian wedding clothes =

Sets of clothes worn to weddings

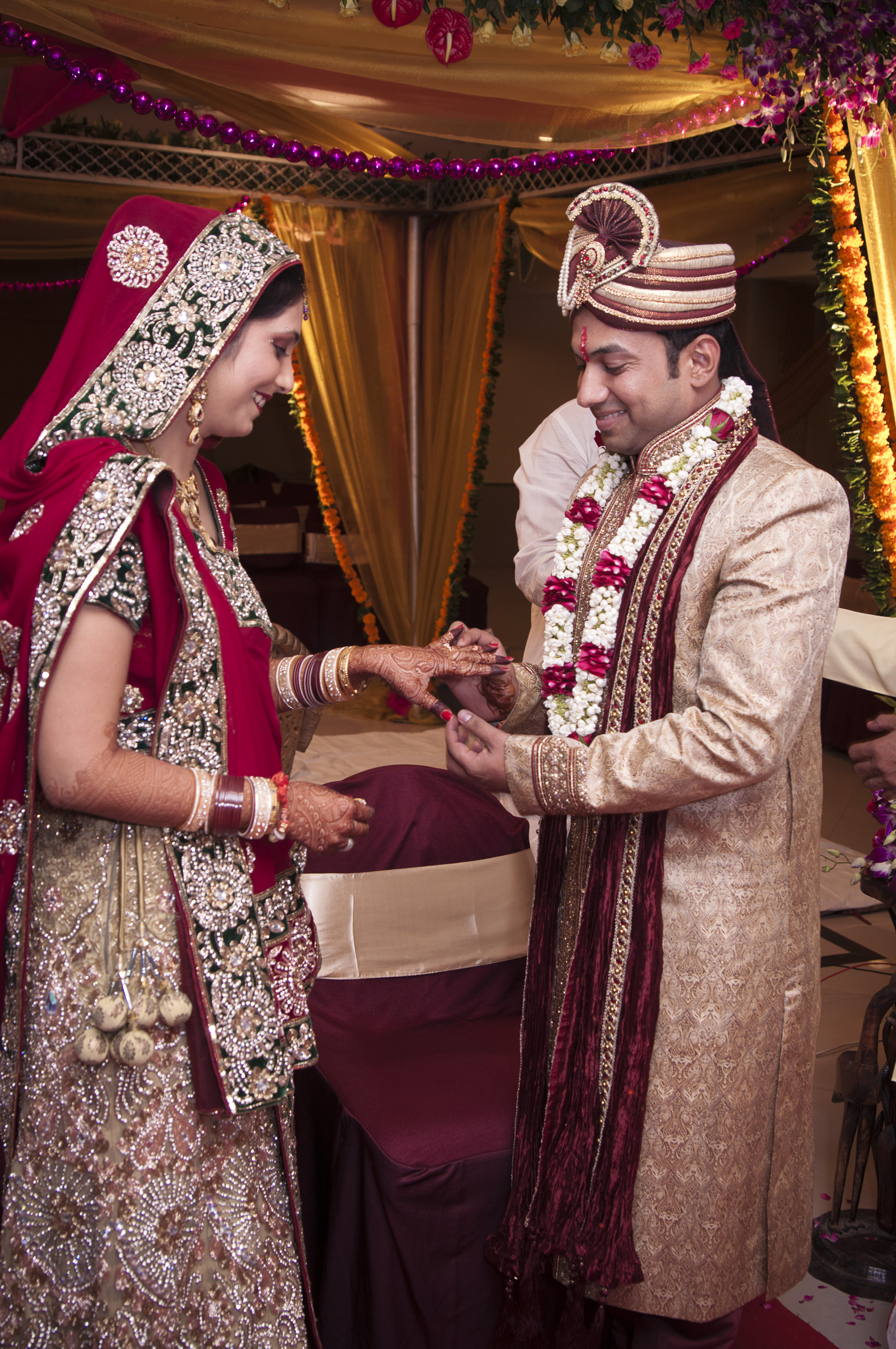
Bride in Lehenga and Groom in Sherwani the usual clothes of North Indian Hindu weddings

Indian wedding clothes refer to the traditional attire worn by a wedding couple and wedding guests.

== Clothing culture ==
The bride is usually dressed up in auspicious colors. Many of the guests attending the wedding wear gold jewelry including the bride and sometimes the groom. The women are additionally adorned with henna patterns on their palms, hands, forearms, legs, and feet.

Indian weddings generally tend to continue for several days and new attire is worn each day. All these dresses and the colour symbolize the meaning of marriage and the period that follows it.

== Hindu weddings ==
Indian Hindu weddings continue for several days. India is a country that defines diversity, and this is visible even in the wedding and its different styles. The ceremonies, the rituals, and the formalities are all different in each region and culture. In the North, starting with the tilak ceremony, each function has significance in the marriage. Tilak, sangeet, haldi, baraat & the shaadi; all necessitate the bride and the bridegroom to wear new attire on each occasion. All these above ceremonies are known by different names in the other parts, for eg, simant puja in the west, or mangalasnanam in the south and so on.

=== Bridegroom's clothes ===
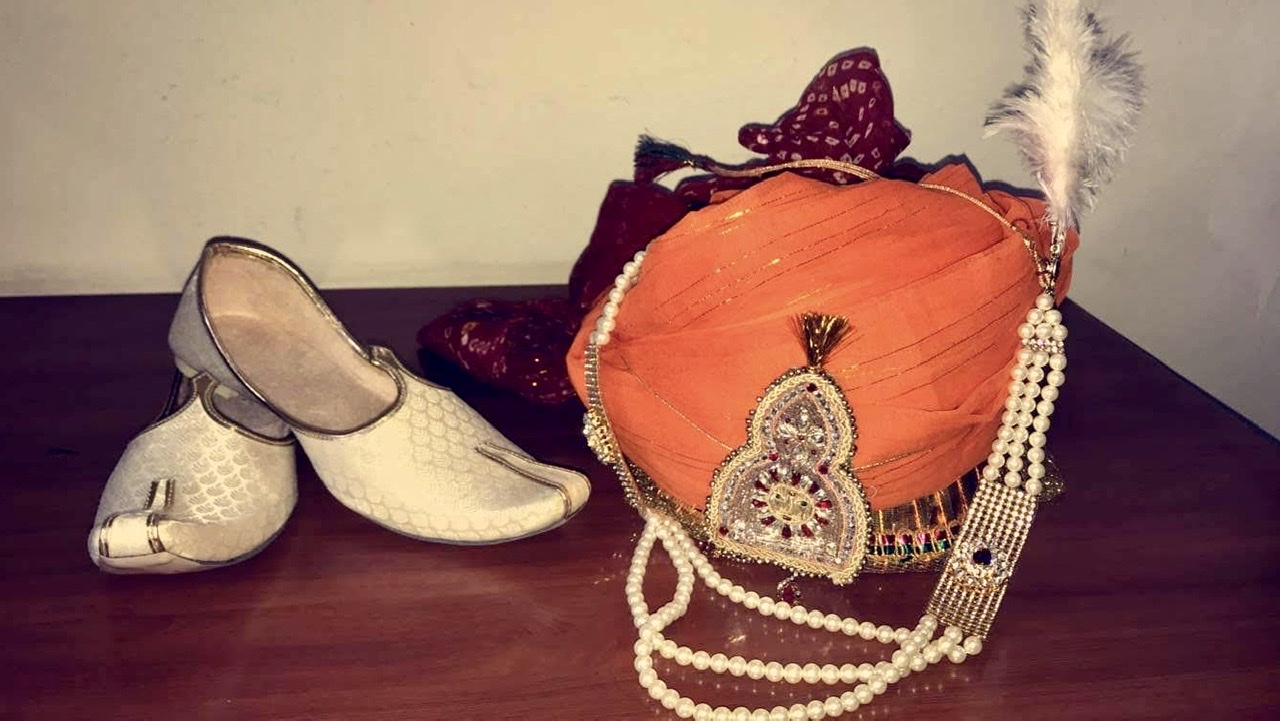
Indian wedding accessories

Many communities of southern, western & eastern India adhere to their ethnics wears such as dhoti, mundu & veshti. In South India, a shirt may be worn with dhoti or sometimes just an angavastra may be used to cover the chest, some grooms go topless or shirtless.

On the other hand, in the northern parts, the bridegroom usually wears a sherwani or a jodhpuri. The groom's face is veiled with a curtain of flowers which is called sehra in the north, which is not the custom elsewhere. It is also customary to wear a taqiyah all through the ceremony in Muslim marriages.

=== Bride's clothes ===
The bride wears a wedding sari or lehenga-kurti & odhni depending on the region. In Indian culture, the wedding dress of the bride comes from the groom's side as a shagun. Red is considered to be the most auspicious colour for a Hindu bride. While the sari is preferred as the bridal dress in South India, ethnic wear such as the mekhela sador is preferred in North-east India & brides of the North India prefer lehenga.

== Christian weddings ==
Christian marriage in India is mostly an adaptation of white weddings. The bridegroom usually wears a black suit or tuxedo. The bride usually wears a white gown or white dress. Among the South Canarese Christians: Some brides wear the gown to church ceremonies, then change into the sari, after the wedding dances in their wedding receptions. In the erstwhile South Canara area, Christian grooms would wear the dhoti to their weddings, but dhotis' usages have been stopped since the 1960s, likely because of the westernisation or anglo-americanisation of male attire in South Asia.

== See also ==
- Choli
- Churidar
- Dress code
- Dupatta
- Ghagra choli
- Ghoonghat
- Clothing in India
- Indo-Western clothing
- Khara dupatta
- Lehenga-style sari
- Sarong
- Sherwani
- Wedding sari
