= Hyderabadi Pahalwan =

Indian sportspeople

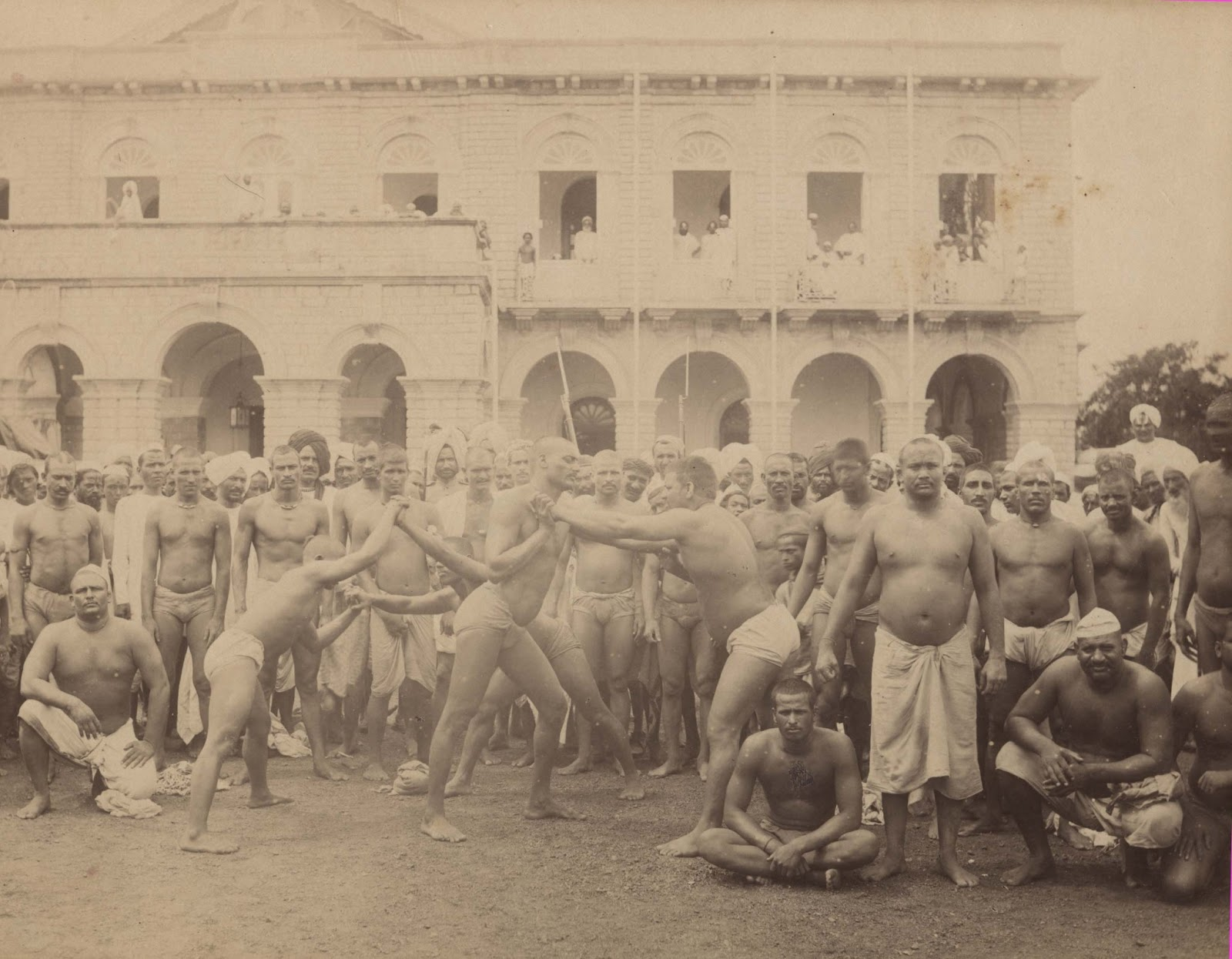
Hyderabadi Pahalwans preparing for Kushti (Indian form of wrestling) during a competition held during the 1870s

Pahalwan ( Urdu پہلوان the word is originally derived from Persian ) also pronounced as Pehelwan, Pahelwan means Wrestler in English. In erstwhile Hyderabad State, the word Pahalwan was generally called and related with two types of People.

- First, as it means Wrestler were those Pahalwans patronised by royalty as wrestlers during the princely era, who brought fame and respect for Hyderabad State by winning titles worldwide in Kushti (Indian free style wrestling).
- The other term of Pahalwan was as similar as Bhai of Bombay now (Mumbai), India, who afterwards of Indian Independence turned to the practice of landlords and consider as main War Lords in city crimes, mostly involved into crimes like Land grabbing, Extorting and Real estate.

Initially in Hyderabad, the Pahalwan were mostly Arab's (locally known as Chaush), Thus the name Pahalwan was given to those Chaush Wrestlers, and this brought them into the public eyes (Thus most of the people in Hyderabad understand, that most of the pahalwans are chaush). In early days, they were respected by residents and were encouraged to settle public issues.

== History ==
History of Chaush Pahalwan can be traced to the Nizam's era. It was in 1818 AD during Mir Akbar Ali Khan Sikander Jah, Asaf Jah III some of the Hadramut Arabs migrated to Hyderabad from Bhoslas of Nagpur and their discharge from Poona ( now Pune).

== Growth ==
Initially in Hyderabad, the Pahalwans were mostly Arabs (locally known as Chaush). Thus, the title Pahalwan were given to those Chaush wrestlers, and this brought them into the public (Thus most of the people in Hyderabad understand all the pahalwan are chaush). In early days, they were respected by residents and were encouraged to settle public issues.

== See also ==
- Chaush
