= Shahi Masjid =

Mosque in Hyderabad, Telangana, India

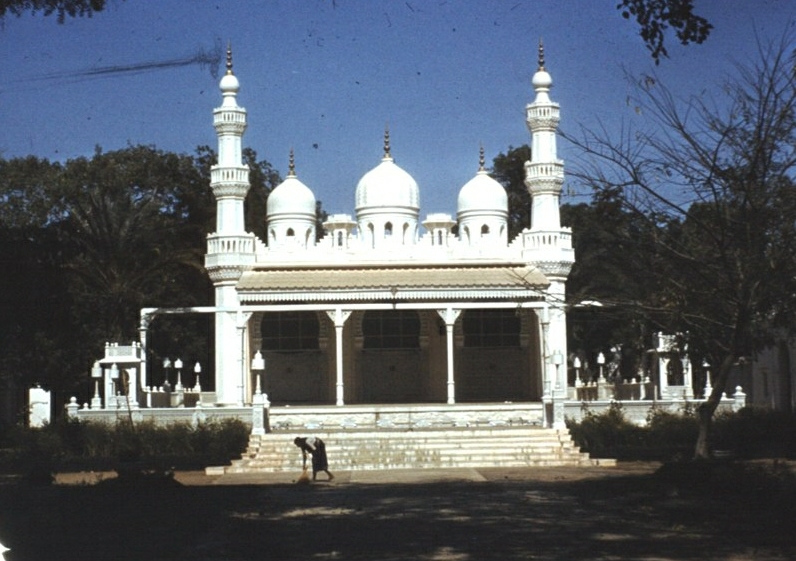
- The mosque in 1952

- Location of the mosque in Hyderabad

Religion
- Affiliation: Islam
- Ecclesiastical or organizational status: Mosque
- Status: Active

Location
- Location: Public Gardens, Hyderabad, Hyderabad District, Telangana
- Country: India
- Interactive map of Shahi Masjid
- Coordinates: 17°26′38″N 78°28′21″E

Architecture
- Type: Mosque architecture
- Founder: Mir Osman Ali Khan
- Established: 1924
- Completed: 1933

Specifications
- Dome: Three
- Minaret: Two

The Shahi Masjid, also known as the Masjid Awan e Shahi, the Public Garden Mosque, and as the Bagh E Aam ke Masjid, is a mosque, located within the Public Gardens, adjacent to Telangana Legislative Assembly, in Hyderabad, in the Hyderabad district of the state of Telangana, India.

In 1924 the Nizam of Hyderabad Mir Osman Ali Khan commissioned the construction of the Shahi Masjid thru "the City Improvement Board" and was completed in 1933. The mosque served as a principal mosque for the VII Nizam and his courtiers.

== See also ==
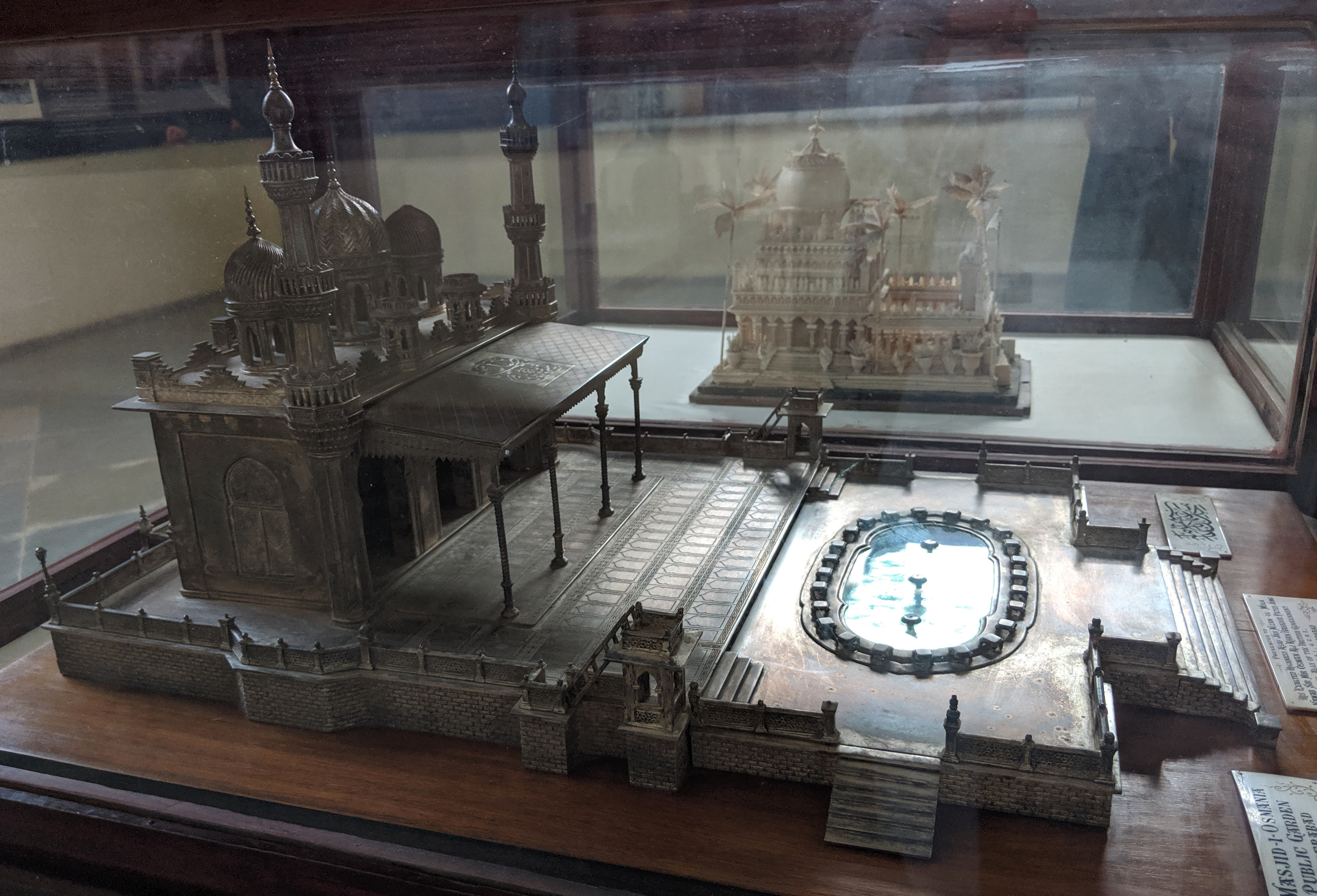
A model of Shahi Masjid at Chowmahalla Palace

- Islam in India
- List of mosques in India
