= Sakharpuda =

Indian engagement ceremony

Sakharpuda is an engagement ceremony for Maharashtrian communities. It is also known as waangnischay (vāṅaniścaya) which literally means verbal agreement. Sakhar means sugar and puda means a packet or box.

In the sakharpuda, a pre-wedding ceremony, the prospective bridegroom's parents give a packet of sugar to the bride, and the bride's parents give a coconut and coin to the prospective bridegroom. This signifies a solemn promise by both the parents to give their children in marriage. The groom's parents present a sari to the bride, which symbolizes her acceptance into the groom's family. Her hands are adorned with green bangles, and some couples also exchange rings. Traditionally the families wait to print and send the wedding invites until after the sakharpuda.
