= Khara dupatta =

Wedding ensemble of Muslim brides

Khada dupatta (Urdu: کھڑا دوپٹہ "upright stole") is the traditional wedding dress of Hyderabadi Muslim brides in the Indian subcontinent. It is an elaborate wedding ensemble comprising a kurta (tunic), chooridaar (extra-long slim pants that gather at the ankles), and a 6-yard dupatta (stole or veil).

== History ==
Early in the 17th century, Turkish and Persian craftsmen were invited to India by Mughal Empress Noor Jehan to craft a noble dress, that became particular only for family members of Mughal noble ladies. The art of dupatta crafting remains particular to Mughal descendants. Later, when Mughal governor Nizam-ul-Mulk declared his autonomy over Hyderabad Deccan Suba, the begums of Nizam's family modified the creative style of Mughals to form Khara Dupatta. Which was later practiced by general residents of Hyderabad. The montage gallery at Chowmahalla Palace exhibits the lifestyle royal dresses of Nizams Begums which includes Kara Dupatta.

== The ensemble ==
Sometimes the kurta is worn with a long, lightweight sleeveless overcoat or a shorter koti, a bolero-like waistcoat. The brides wear a matching ghoonghat (veil) over the head.

The dupatta is usually made of net material and embroidered with zardozi work. The border of the dupatta has masala or a ribbon border with embroidered golden motifs.

The usual accompanying jewellery is:

- Tika/maang tikka/head locket - a medallion of uncut diamonds worn on the forehead and suspended by a string of pearls
- Jhoomar/paasa - a fan-shaped ornament worn on the side of the head
- Nath - a nose ring with a large ruby bead flanked by two pearls
- Chintaak a.k.a. Jadaoo lachcha or Guluband - a choker studded with uncut diamonds and precious stones
- Kan phool - earrings that match the Chintaak and consist of a flower motif covering the ear lobe and a bell-shaped ornament that is suspended from the flower. The weight of precious stones and gold in the Karan phool is held up by sahare or supports made of strands of pearls that are fastened into the wearer's hair.
- Satlada - necklace of seven strands of pearls set with emeralds, diamonds and rubies
- Ranihaar - a long strand of pearls with a wide pendant
- Jugni - necklace with several strands of pearls with a central pendant
- Gote - Shellac bangles studded with rhinestones and worn with gold colored glass bangles called sonabai
- Payal - anklets
- Gintiyan - toe rings

== Wearing style ==
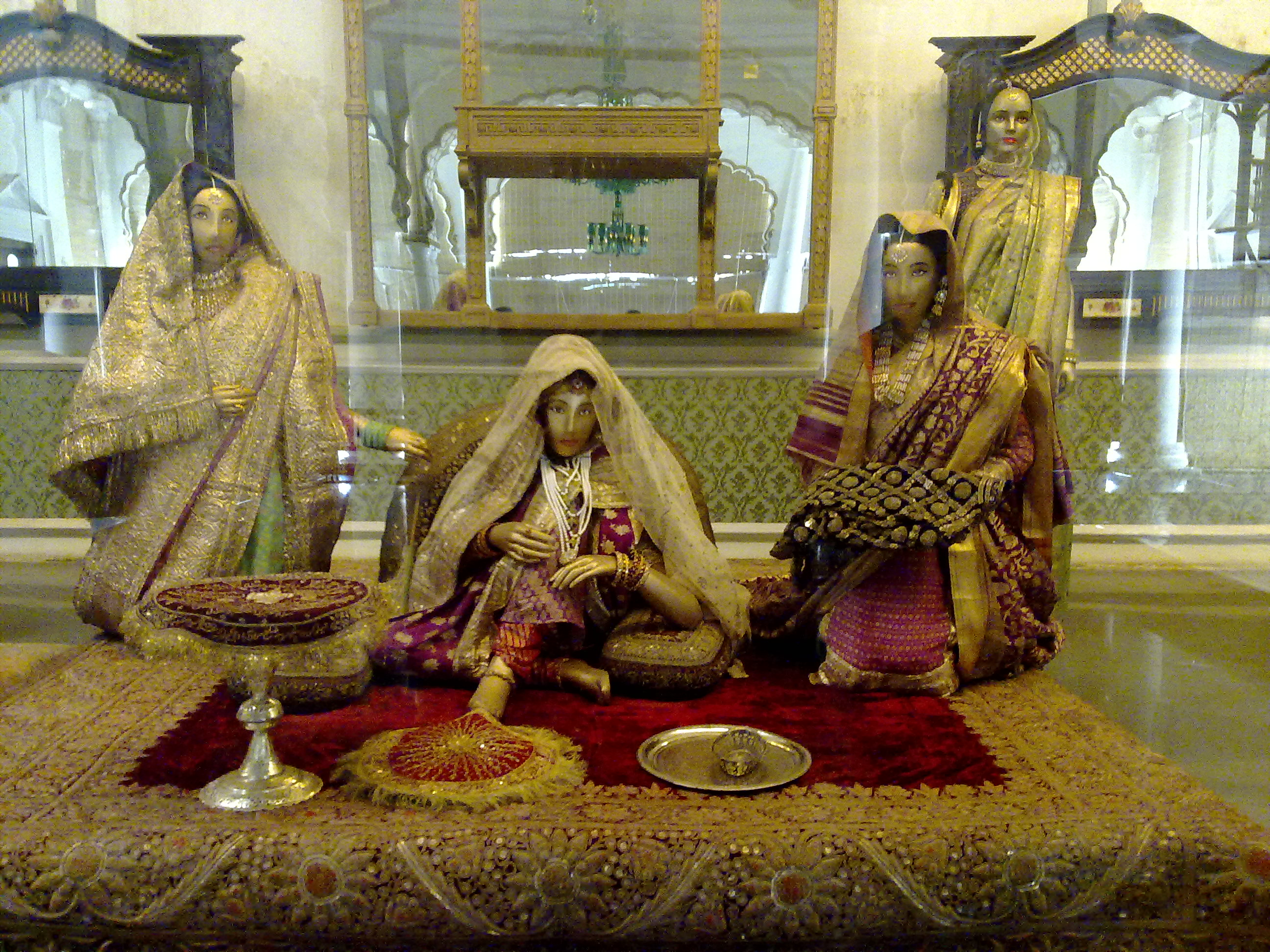
Khara Dupatta in Museum

The dupatta is draped with the very top part of the middle of the dupatta tucked into the back of the chooridaar. The dupatta is folded accordion pleats at both ends, which are held in place on the left shoulder with a brooch. The free ends of the dupatta are worn under the right shoulder and over the inside of the right elbow.

== See also ==
- Achkan
- Indian wedding clothes
- Ghoonghat
- Indian dress
- Salwar kameez
- Churidar
- Kurta
- Ghagra
- Lehenga
- Dupatta
- Wedding sari
