= Jalna =

Jalna may refer to:

== India ==
- Jalna (Lok Sabha constituency), a parliamentary constituency of Maharashtra
- Jalna (Vidhan Sabha constituency), an assembly constituency of Maharashtra
- Jalna, Maharashtra, a city and a municipal council in Jalna district
- Jalna district, an administrative district in the state of Maharashtra in western India
- Jalna railway station a railway station between Chhatrapati Sambhajinagar and Parbhani

== Other uses ==
- Jalna (film), a 1935 film adaptation of the novel directed by John Cromwell
- Jalna (novel series), a 16-book series by Canadian author Mazo de la Roche
- Jalna, a locality in Lac Ste. Anne County, Alberta, Canada
