= Wedding sari =

South Asian wedding dress

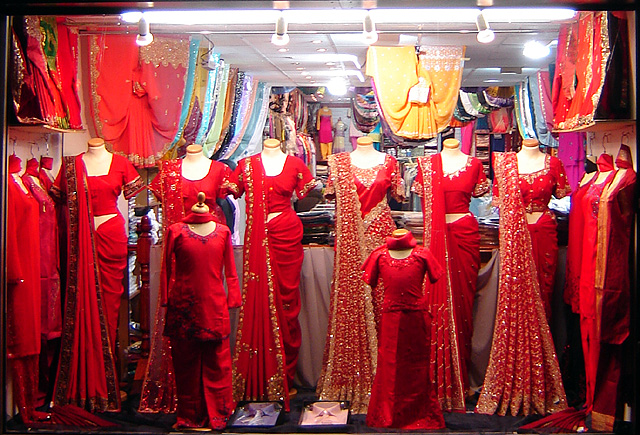
Sari display at a store

A wedding sari is a traditional South Asian wedding dress.

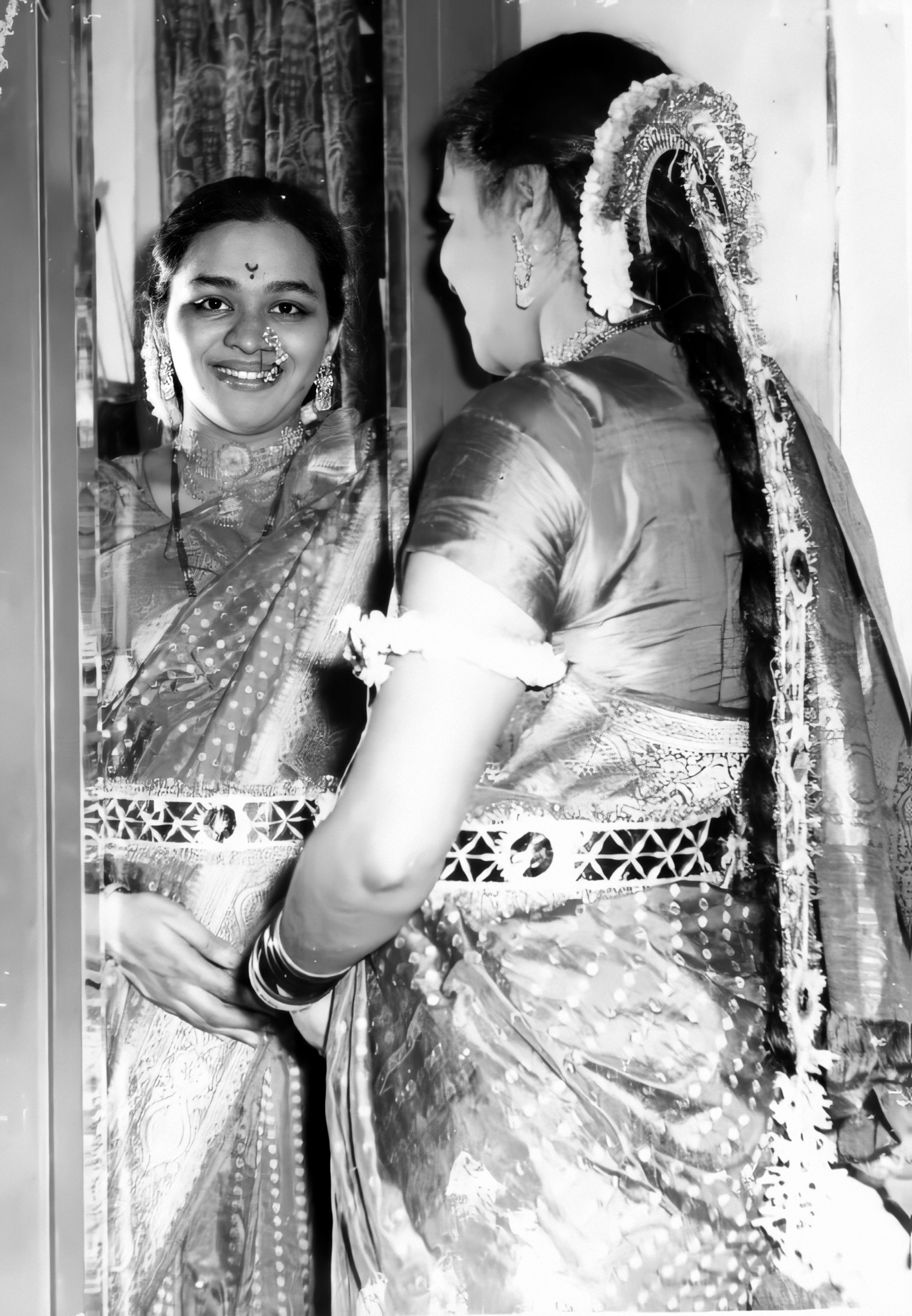
Traditional Indian bride in Sari

Wedding saris are usually red, a colour associated with married women, although colour combinations vary by region, caste, and religion. The sari can consist of a combination of red and green with golden brocade. Non-Brahmin women in Tamil Nadu traditionally wear red-and-white checked saris. The Padmasali wedding sari is a white sari that has been dyed with turmeric. Gujarati women wear red and white panetar saris.

Sari fabric is also traditionally silk. Over time, colour options and fabric choices for Indian brides have expanded. Today fabrics like lycra, organza, khadi, chiffon, linen, lace, velvet, brocade, crêpe, Georgette, tissue, cotton and satin are used.

Types of wedding saris include Kanchipuram silk sari, Banarasi wedding sari, Sambalpuri sari, Assam silk, Gota sari, Resham sari, Zardosi sari, paithani sari, Bandhani sari, Neriyathum sari, as well as Jamdani, Dhakai, Katan and Rajshahi usually in red.

== See also ==
- Clothing in India
- Handloom sari
- History of clothing in the Indian subcontinent
- Indian wedding clothes
- Indo-Western clothing
- Muslin trade in Bengal
- Textile arts of Bangladesh
