= Lukhmi =

Type of samosa of Hyderabad, India

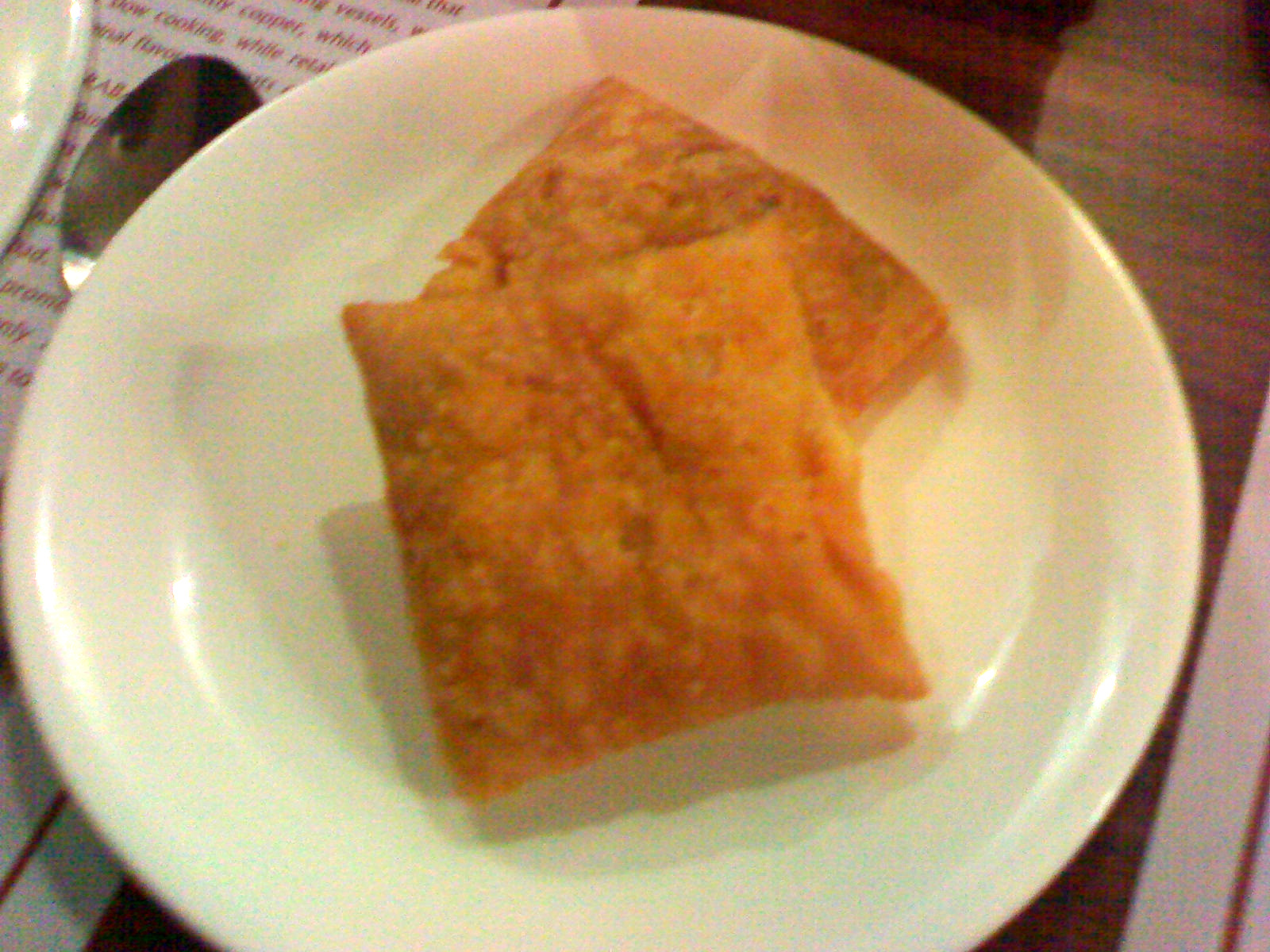
- Course: Starter or snack
- Place of origin: South Asia
- Region or state: Hyderabad, Deccan
- Main ingredients: Mince meat, flour, yogurt

Luqmi (Urdu: لقمی; pronounced lukhmi in Deccani Urdu) is a typical mince savoury or starter of the cuisine of Hyderabad, Deccan. The snack's authentic preparation includes stuffing with mutton-mince qeema (ground meat). The luqmi is a flat square pastry.

The word comes from loqma or morsel in Arabic.

== Ingredients ==
Mince meat (qeema), flour and yogurt.

== Preparation ==
Prepare the dough in yogurt, mixing it thoroughly until it becomes very smooth, and stuff it with minced meat.

Kheemey-ki-Luqmi is still served as a starter in the authentic Hyderabadi weddings and other celebrations.

== See also ==
- Hyderabadi cuisine
- Hyderabadi biryani
- Hyderabadi haleem
