= List of tourist attractions in Hyderabad =

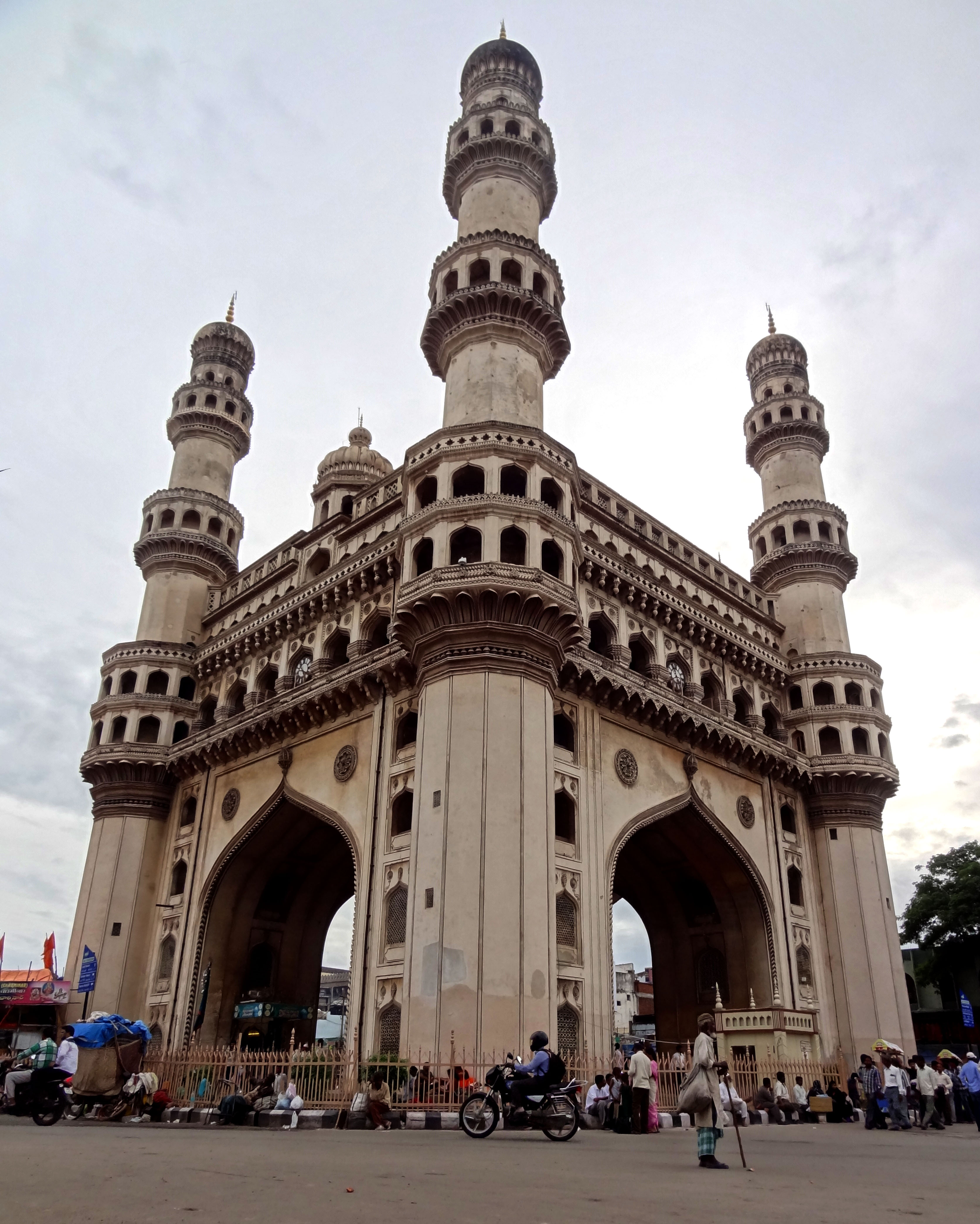
Charminar

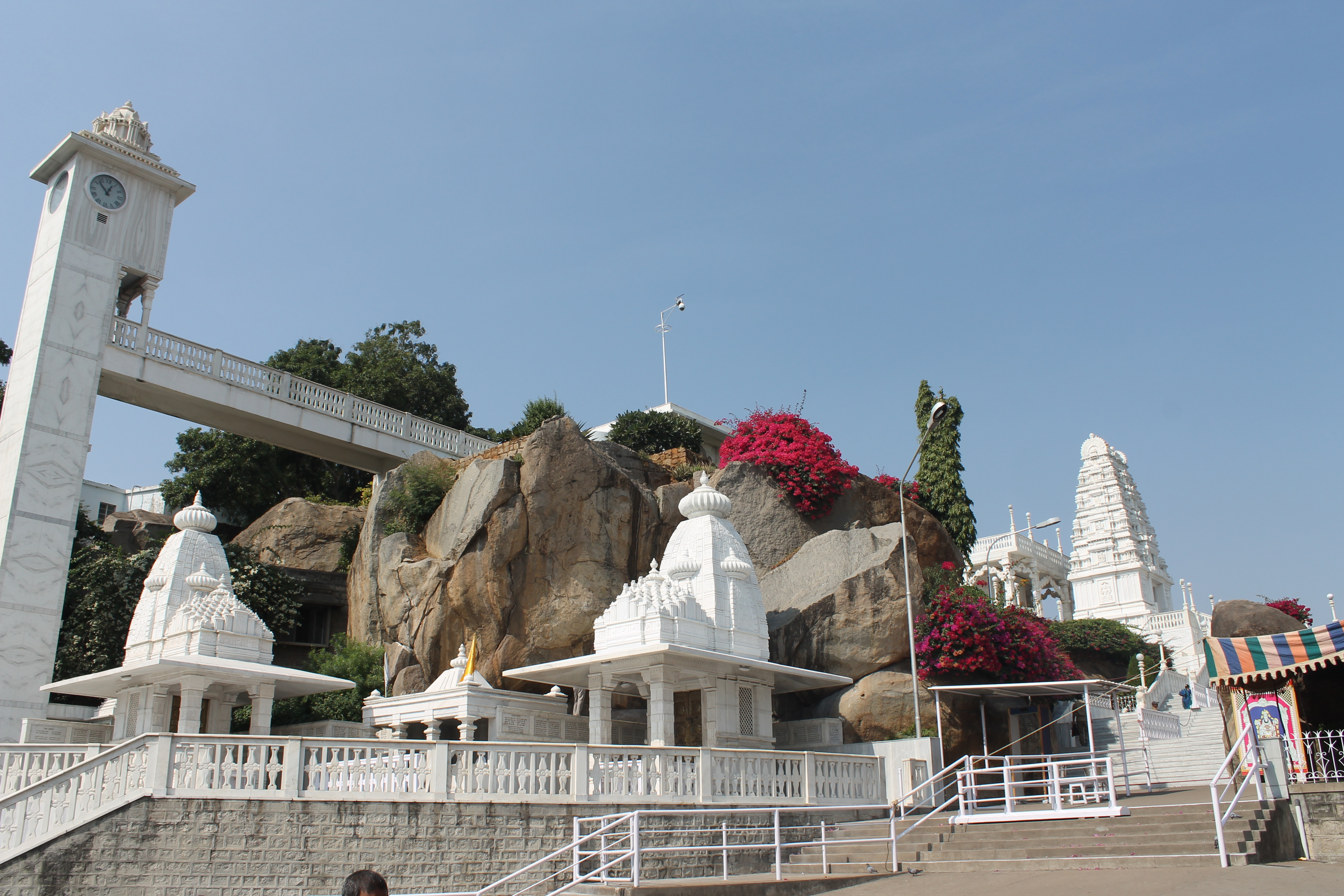
Birla Mandir Hyderabad

Hyderabad is the capital and largest city of the South Indian state of Telangana. It was ruled by the Qutub Shahis, Mughals and the Nizams which shaped its history. The city is noted for its monuments which includes the masterpiece of Charminar and the fort of Golconda. There are a multitude of masjids, temples, churches and bazaars in the city.

The tourism industry forms an important role in the economy of Hyderabad. Tourism-related fairs are held regularly, and in 2010, the city was listed among the Beta- World City by the global city index produced by GaWC, and in 2011 the city was rated 19th in the world by The New York Times in The list of 41 Places to Go in 2011. As of 2011, the tourism promotion budget for the city was increased to ₹ 520 million. Telangana, which is India's top domestic tourist destination, receives up to 157 million visits, and reached 1.5 million international tourists, which generated US$23 million in revenue. The city houses famous historical sites including Charminar, UNESCO Asia Pacific Heritage site of the Chowmahalla Palace, Salar Jung Museum (among the world's largest private collection museums) as well as art galleries, libraries, sports complexes, museums and theaters. It is the place of nawabs.

Hyderabad is known as The City of Pearls, as once it was the only global centre for trade of large diamonds, emeralds and natural pearls. Many traditional and historical bazaars are located around the city. The Laad Bazaar situated near Charminar has shops that sell pearls, jewellery and products such as silverware, Nirmal, Kalamkari paintings and artefacts, bidriware, lacquer bangles studded with stones, saris, handwoven materials in silk and cotton. The following is a list of tourist attractions in Hyderabad.

== Historical monuments ==
Panorama of Hyderabad

- Charminar – a major landmark of Hyderabad with four graceful minarets located in the old city. It was built by Muhammed Quli Qutb Shah as a memorial for plague victims and was the tallest structure in Hyderabad for nearly 400 years. Charminar, on most occasions, is used to represent the city and the state and is hailed as a unique Deccan monument. It is in the midst of Charkaman which are four archways to roads leading in all four directions from the Charminar monument.
- Mecca Masjid – A symbolic mosque, Mecca Masjid was built 400 years ago during the reign of Sultan Muhammad Qutub Shah, the 6th Qutub Shahi Sultan of Hyderabad. The three-arched facade has been carved from a single piece of granite, which took five years to quarry. More than 8,000 workers were employed to build the mosque. Muhammed Qutub Shah personally laid the foundation stone.

Jean-Baptiste Tavernier, the French explorer, in his travelogue observed, "It is about 50 years since they began to build a splendid pagoda in the town which will be the grandest in all India when it is completed. The size of the stone is the subject of special accomplishment, and that of a niche, which is its place for prayer, is an entire rock of such enormous size that they spent five years in quarrying it, and 500 to 600 men were employed continually on its work. It required still more time to roll it up on to conveyance by which they brought it to the pagoda; and they took 1400 oxen to draw it".

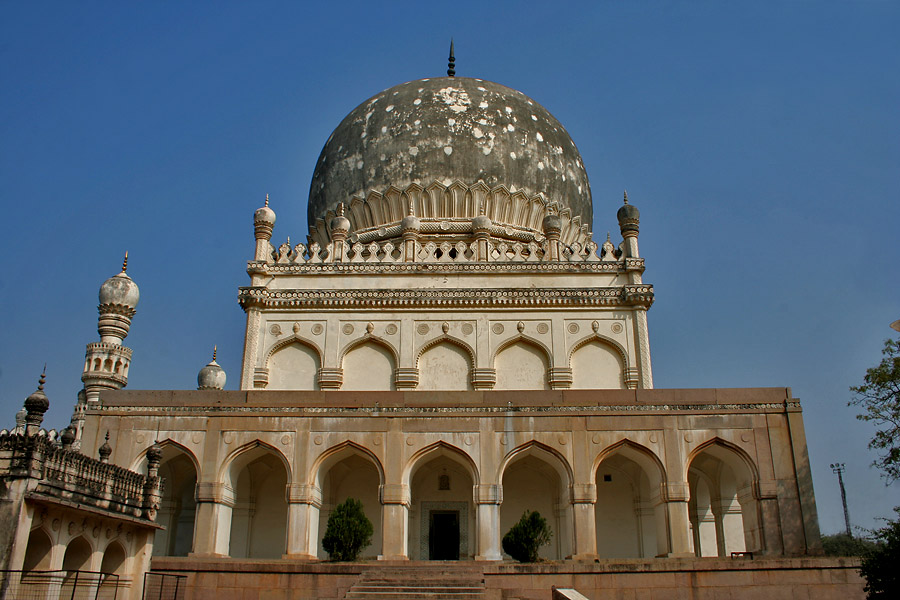
Qutb Shahi Tombs in Hyderabad, India

- Golconda Fort – Once abandoned by Qutub Shahis, Golconda Fort is one of the most magnificent fortress complexes in India. Seated on a hill on one side and spiraling fort on the other, its location and internal design made it one of the strongest forts in India.
- Qutb Shahi Tombs – home to various tombs dedicated to Rulers of Qutub Shahi dynasty, located at Shaikpet, near Golconda Fort. These are an example of Deccan architecture with large minarets, huge domes, delicate marble designs and multiple inner passages.
- Paigah Tombs – These are a recently discovered series of mausoleums with unique geometrical sculptures which were nowhere found in the world. These are located at Chandrayanagutta. Paigahs were noblemen under the reign of the Nizams.
- Spanish Mosque, Begumpet – This is one of several mosques in Secunderabad/Hyderabad. The mosque is of Moorish architecture and was constructed by Sir Vicar-ul-Umra a Paigah Nawab in 1906.
- Hayat Bakshi Mosque, Hayathnagar – Built by one of the most prolific women during the rule of the Qutb Shahis, Hayat Begum (Ma Saheba), the mosque is located in a complex that houses a caravan sarai and large well popularly called the Hathi Bowli.

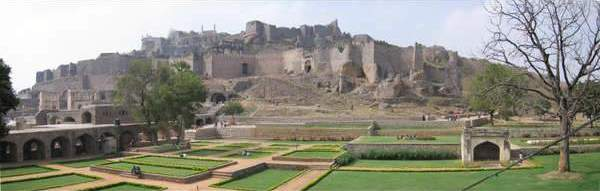
Golconda Fort was originally built by Kakatiya as part of their western defenses.

=== Palaces ===
- Falaknuma Palace – built by an Italian architect through one of the Paigah nobles, Nawab Viqar al-Umra', complete with Italian marble, Louis XIV-style decor, a Mughal ambience, Italian marble staircases and ornate fountains. It has now been undertaken by Taj group to develop this as a heritage hotel. It had taken 9 years to build the palace, from 1884 to 1893. The library in the Palace is said to be as majestic as the one in the Windsor Castle. One of the main attractions of the palace is the 100 seater table that is 108 feet long.
- Chowmahalla Palace – It was the seat of Asaf Jahi dynasty, where the Nizam entertained his official guests and royal visitors. Initiated in 1750 by Nizam Salabat Jung and designed along the lines of the Shah's palace in Isfahan, this actually consists of a group of palaces each used as a Durbar Hall. It has now been aesthetically renovated and is also a venue for conferences.
- Asman Garh Palace – It was designed personally and built by the erstwhile Prime Minister of Hyderabad state Sir Asman Jah in 1885 on a hillock for his leisure. It is based on Gothic architecture and is in the shape of a European medieval castle. The palace presently hosts a museum displaying archaeological relics.
- Taramati Baradari – Taramati Baradari is a palace located near Gandipet lake, that was built under the reign of Abdullah Qutb Shah, the Seventh Sultan of Golkonda as an ode to his favourite courtesan, Taramati. The baradari with 12 doorways were to allow cross ventilation, considered to be the most ingenious technique at the time. Similar structures like Premavati and Bhagmati can be seen from here.
- Purani Haveli – It was the official residence of the Nizam's parents.
- King Kothi Palace – The last Nizam, Mir Osman Ali Khan lived here.
- Bella Vista, Hyderabad - It was a royal palace of the Nizams built in 1910. It is an Indo-European building standing on a 10-acre (40,000 m2) verdant area. The building's French architect christened it as Bella Vista, meaning beautiful sight, since it overlooks the Hussain sagar lake. It is located in Saifabad suburb. It was modelled on Henley-on-Thames in England. It now houses the Administrative staff college of India.

== Religious places ==
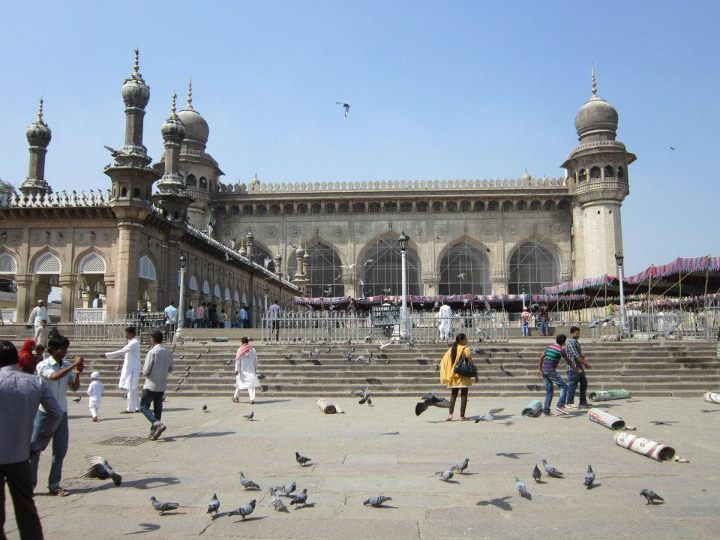
Makkah Masjid

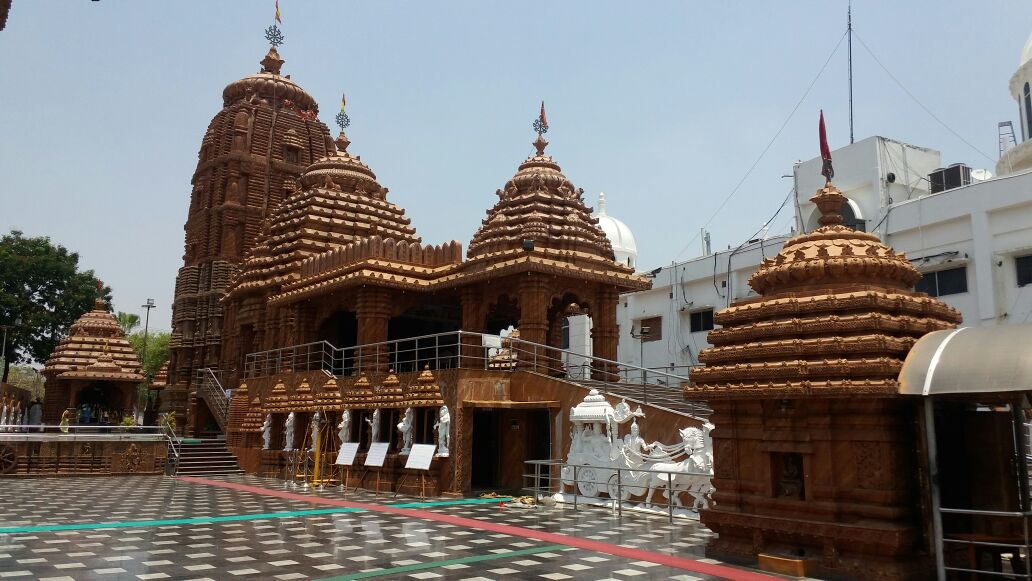
Jagannath Temple, Hyderabad

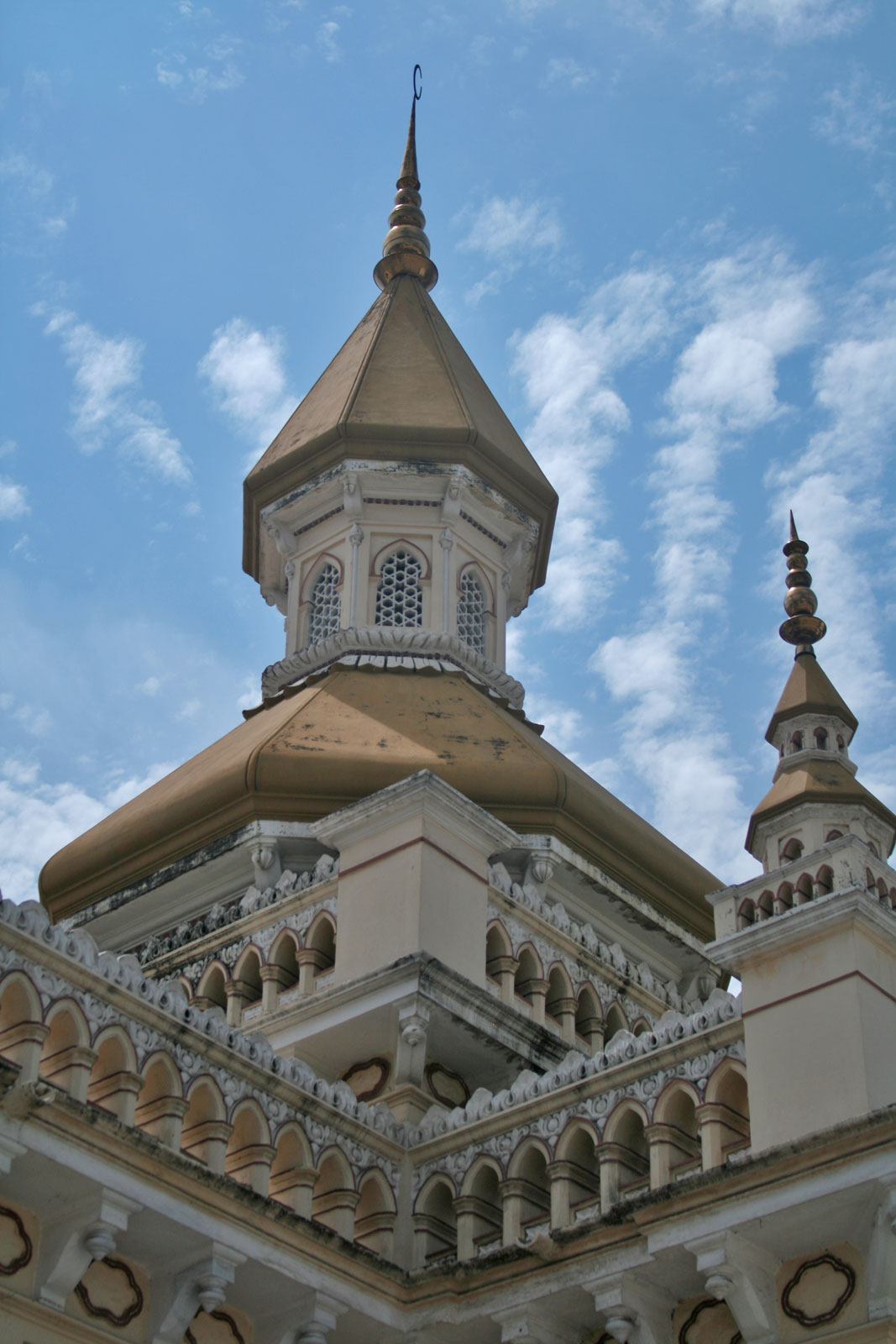
Spanish Mosque, مسجد بايغا Begumpet, Secunderabad 1906

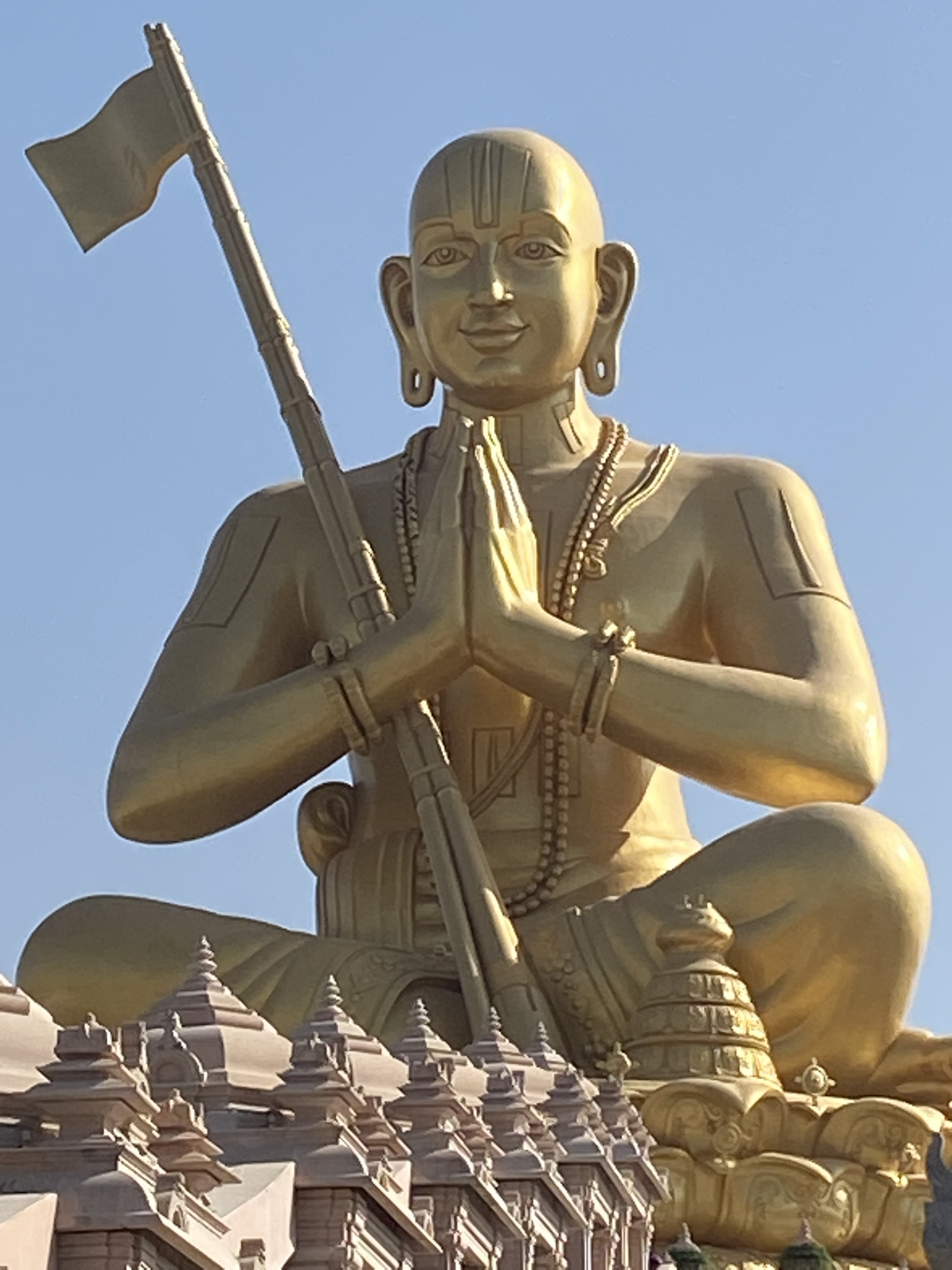
Statue of Equality

- Makkah Masjid – a stone-buiue, which lies immediately southwest of Charminar. This Hyderabad mosque is remarkable for its architecture, size and its royal splendour. It is famous for its symmetry and the gateway bricks that are believed to be from Makkah.
- Charminar – It is not well known that this is a mosque (masjid). It used to have a fountain on its roof, like Gulzar Houz, nearby.
- Shahi Masjid: Is one of the oldest mosques built by Asaf Jah I which is a part of a public garden.
- Birla Mandir – A Hindu temple made of white marble located on top of a hill overlooking the city.
- Sanghi Temple – A temple dedicated to Lord Venkateshwara graces a promontory overlooking Sanghi Nagar, near Ramoji Film City.
- Chilkur Balaji Temple – It is located at Himayatnagar, west side of the Gandipet. It is a temple of Lord Venketeshwara.
- Jagannath Temple – Located near Banjara Hills at Road No. 12 in Hyderabad. It is famous for its annual Rathyatra festival.
- Sri Lakshminarasimha Swamy Temple – Located 60 km from Hyderabad is the Hindu Temple of Narasimha Swamy, an incarnation of Lord Vishnu. The annual brahmotsavam held in March includes Yedurkolu, The Celestial Wedding and Divya Vimana Rathotsavam. The birthday of Lord Narasimha is celebrated on 28 April. Lord Narasimha is also known as Yadagiri, hence the name.
- Wargal Saraswati Temple – Located 52 km from Hyderabad is a temple of Goddess Saraswati, the deity of education in Hinduism.
- Statue of Equality - A statue of the 11th-century Indian philosopher Ramanuja, located on the premises of the Chinna Jeeyar Trust at Muchintal, Ranga Reddy district in the outskirts of Hyderabad. It is the second tallest sitting statue in the world.
- Spanish Mosque
- Dargah Yousufain
- Pahadi Shareef
- Khairtabad Mosque
- Toli Masjid

== Museums and planetarium ==
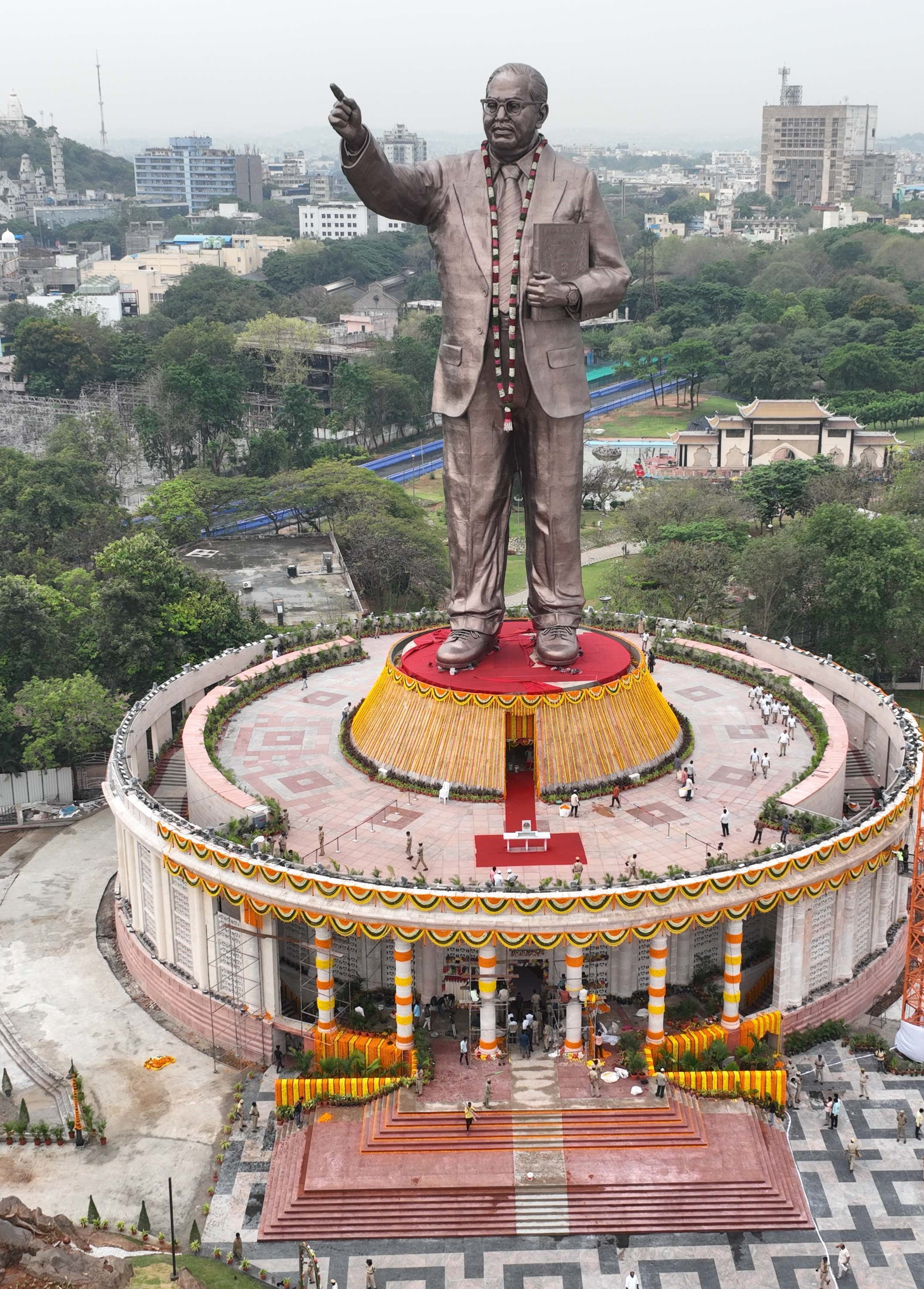
India's tallest statue of BR Ambedkar in Hyderabad

- The Statue of B. R. Ambedkar, Hyderabad – In 2023, The giant 125-foot-tall statue of Dr. Babasaheb Ambedkar has been installed on 11.4 acres, adjoining the banks of historic Hussain Sagar lake and the new Telangana state secretariat. The statue of Dr B R Ambedkar stands tall in his signature pose atop the country’s parliament house, which takes the overall height to 175 feet. It is the fourth tallest statue in India. The circular edifice resembling the parliament of India, also house a museum, library and an audio-visual hall across a 20,000 sq ft area to commemorate the life and times of Ambedkar. On 14 April 2023, Telangana Chief Minister K. Chandrashekar Rao unveiled a 125-feet tall bronze statue of Dr B. R. Ambedkar at the Hussain Sagar lake on his 132nd birth anniversary.

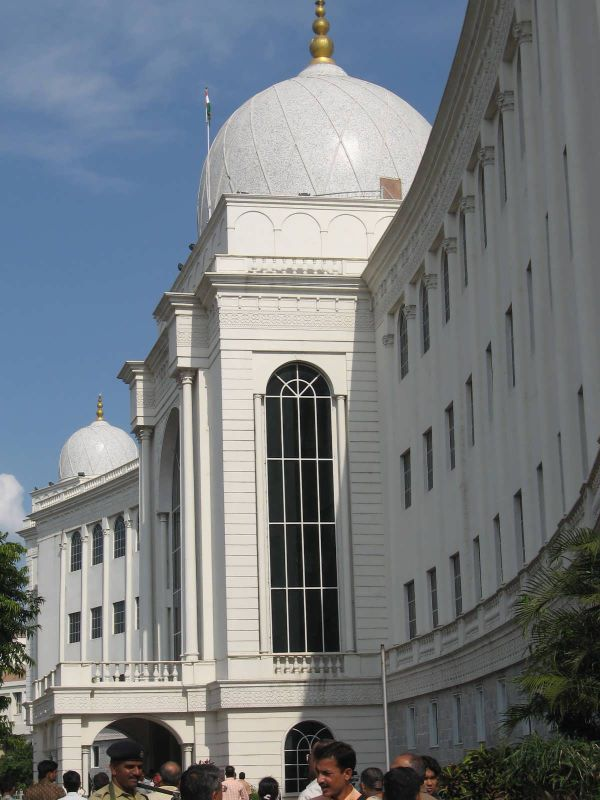
Salar Jung Museum

- Salar Jung Museum – The museum houses the largest one-man collection of antiques in the world. Collections include The Veiled Rebecca and other huge collections of artefacts dating back several centuries. Apart from galleries, there is a reference library, reading room, publication and education section, chemical conservation lab, sales counter, cafeteria etc.
- City Museum, Hyderabad – This museum is newly inaugurated. Muffakham Jah, the grandson of the last ruler of Hyderabad State, said that "The history of Hyderabad was always over shadowed as most historians tended to focus on Moghul rule". The museum has brought nearly 4,000 years of history of the city, through archaeological evidence such as the Neolithic pots, megalithic sites, European styled terracotta figurines, coins of Satvahana period among others.
- Telangana State Archaeology Museum – This is an archaeological museum located inside public gardens.
- Surendrapuri – Surendrapuri is a museum located about 60 km from Hyderabad. The museum is also known as Mythological Awareness Centre. As the name indicates, it was established to create an awareness of Indian mythology.

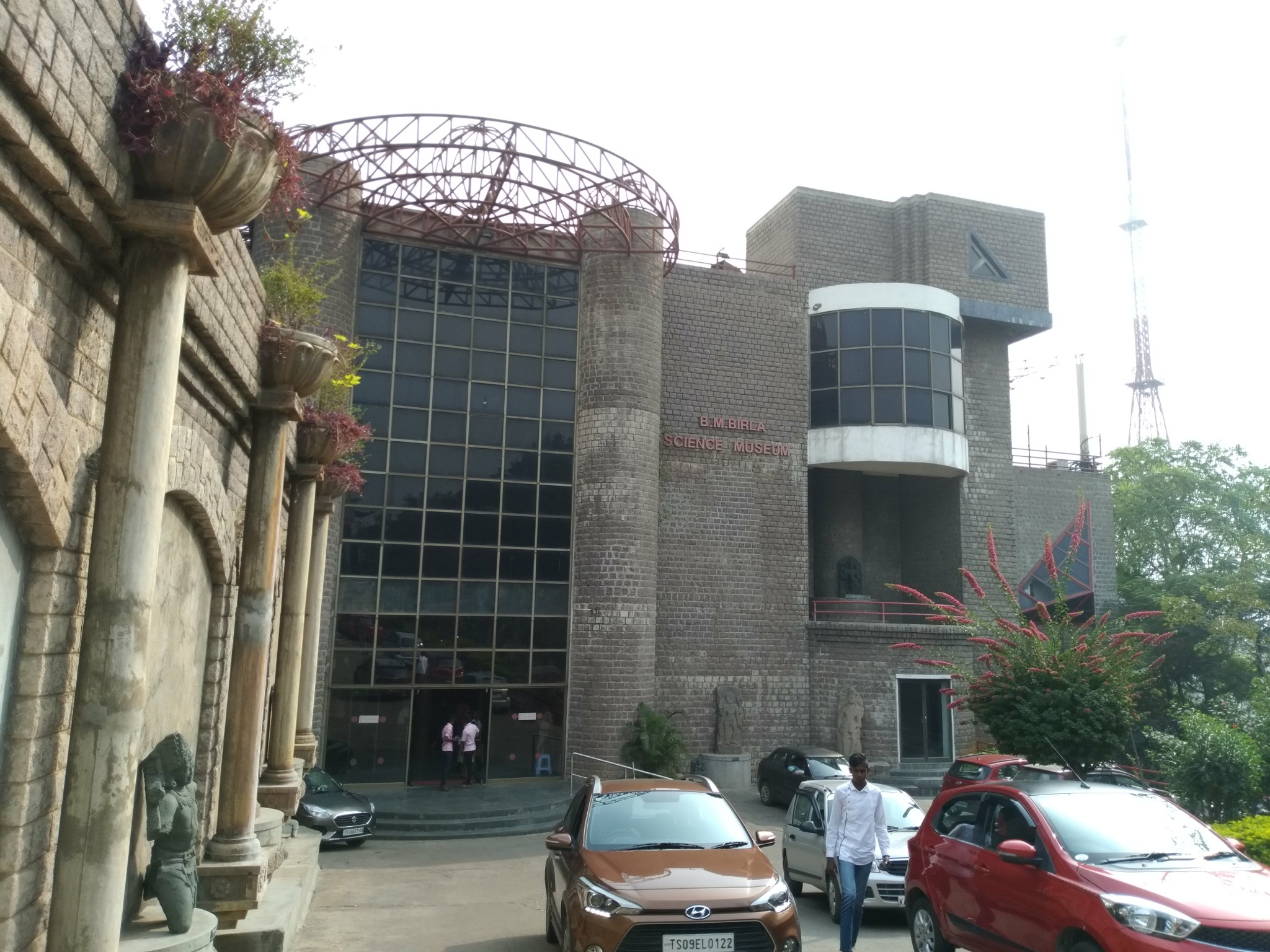
Birla Science Museum Hyd

- Birla Science Museum – The science centre reflects the advances made in science and technology. The interior décor matches the architectural exterior of the centre built over 10,000 sq ft (930 m^{2}). The centre is host to a number of divisions such as the Planetarium, the Science Museum, and the centre for Applied Mathematics and Computer Sciences.
- Birla Planetarium – The Planetarium is a building with a big dome resembling that of the Gol Gumbaz in Bijapur and some of the earliest government structures in New Delhi. A special attraction are the shows which unveil the mysteries of the cosmos and the origins of the universe, comets, eclipses, unidentified flying objects and the clash of titans. The latest addition is the Dinosaurium, which houses a collection of dinosaur egg fossils. The highlight of the museum is a mounted Kotasaurus yamanpalliensis, the remains of a 160-million-year-old dinosaur.
- Purani Haveli – located near afzal gunj bridge, is a single-storied building with European architecture. The museum's attractions include the nizam's walk-in wardrobe, hand-operated lift, etc. This was the residence of a peshwa of Quli qutub shah, which was later taken over by the Asaf Jah (the second nizam)
- Chowmahalla Palace – Renowned for its architectural beauty and intricately crafted walls, this was a building where the guests of the Asaf Jah dynasty were entertained.

== Lakes of Hyderabad ==
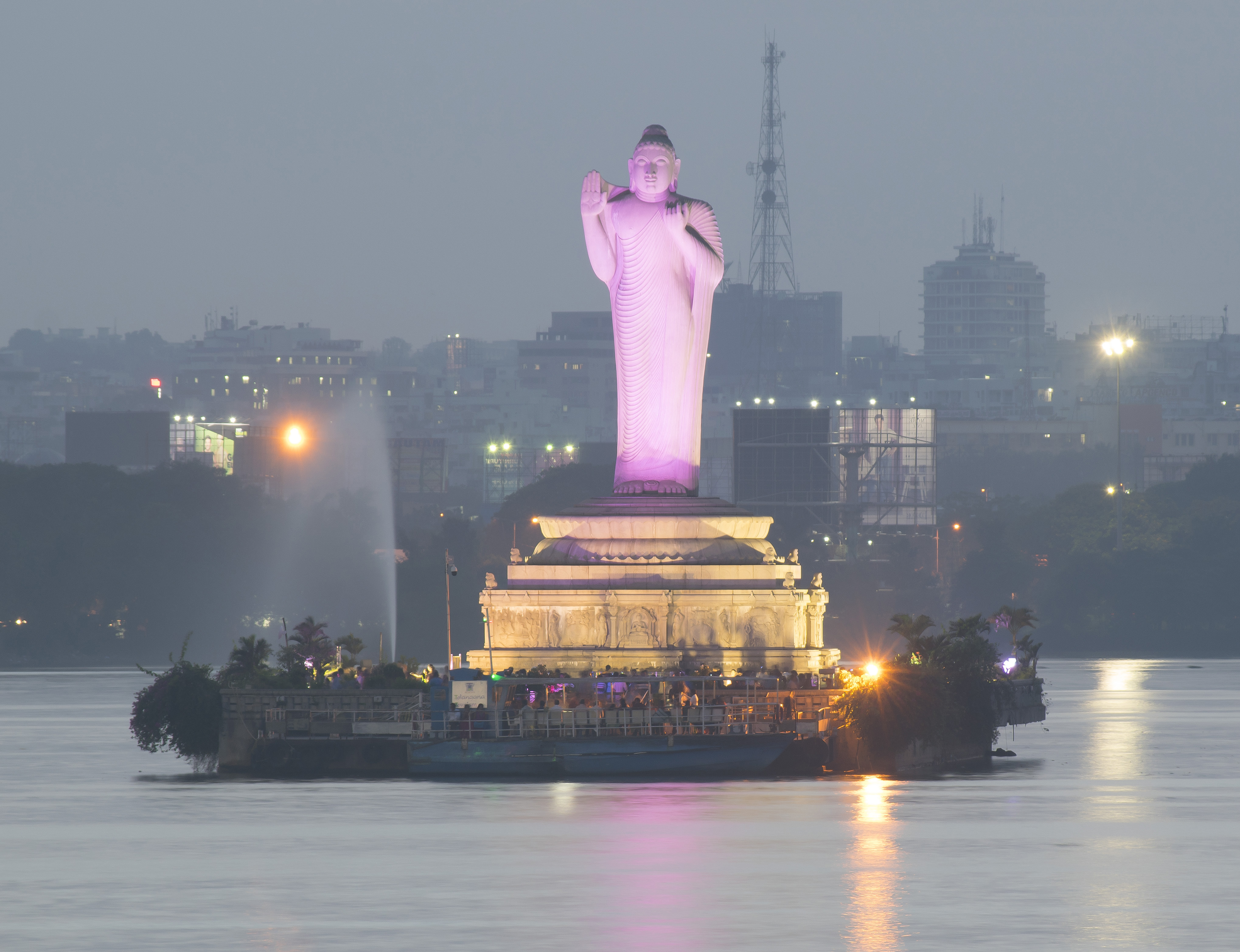
Statue of Buddha amidst the Hussain Sagar Lake

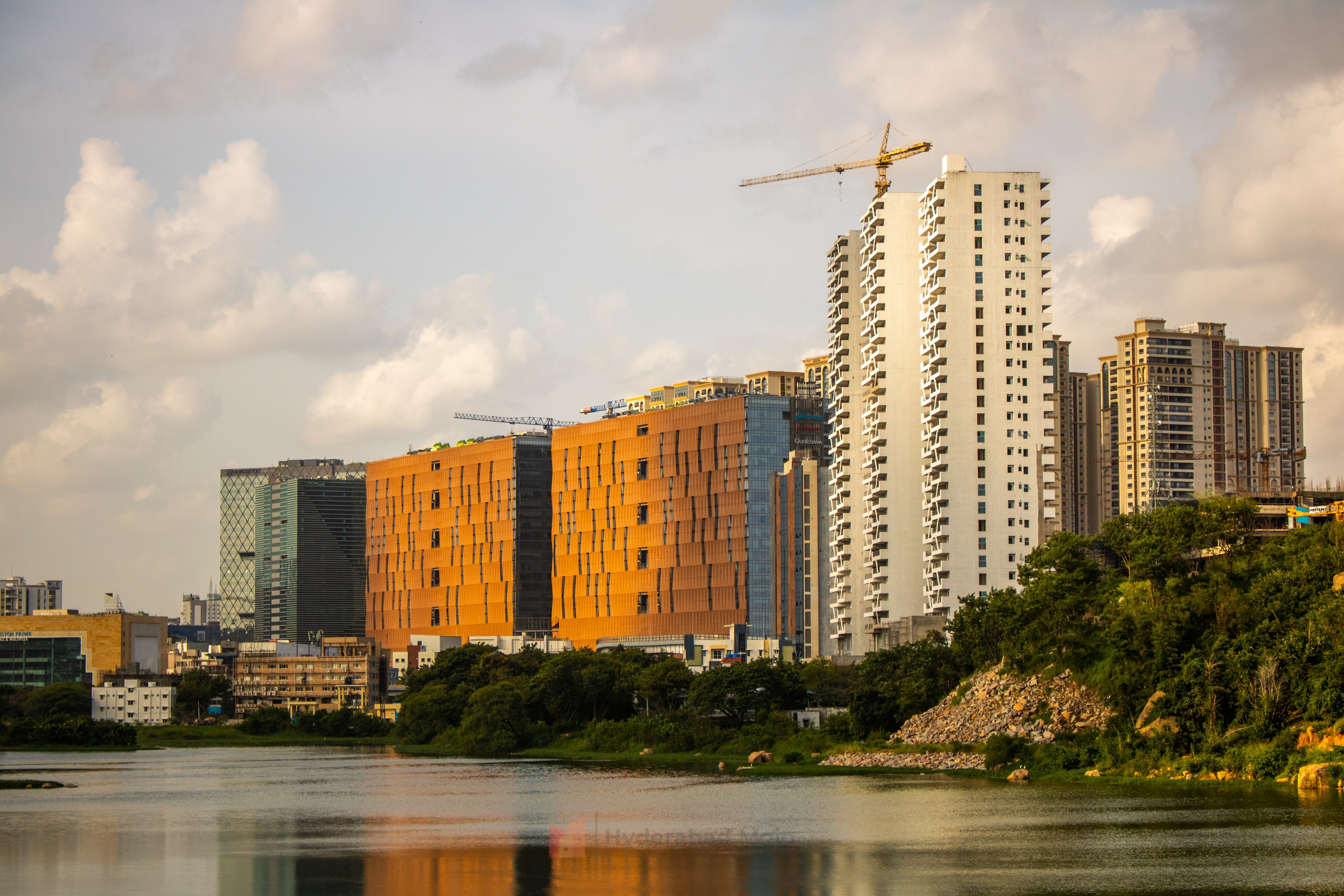
Khajaguda Talab

- Hussain Sagar – It is a man-made lake famous for the 19-metre tall statue of Buddha in the middle of the lake. Located on its banks is Tank Bund which consists of gardens and statues of famous personalities. Boating and water sports are a regular feature at the lake.
- Osman Sagar, Gandipet Lake – Osman Sagar was created by a dam constructed in 1920 on the Musi River to provide a drinking water source for Hyderabad, and also for saving the city from floods; the city had witnessed a flood in 1908. It was constructed during the reign of the last Nizam of Hyderabad, Osman Ali Khan, hence the name. Its parks, resorts, amusement park are a major attraction. Today, the lake is used for public recreation only.
- Durgam Cheruvu – also called The Secret Lake, it is a peaceful boulevard near the bustling Madhapur.
- Himayat Sagar – It is the twin lake to Osman Sagar, Gandipet Lake.
- Shamirpet Lake – is situated 24 km north of Secunderabad. It attracts bird watchers and weekend picnickers. There is also a deer park belonging to the state government near the lake.
- Rukn ud Daula Lake – The lake is named after Sharukh Khan, Nawab Rukn ud-Daula, the 10th Prime Minister (1765–1775) of The Nizam, Mir Akbar Ali Khan Sikander Jah, Asaf Jah III of Hyderabad Deccan.
- Khajaguda Talab - linear-shaped lake situated near to Engineering Staff College of India and CARE Hospitals.

== Parks and gardens ==
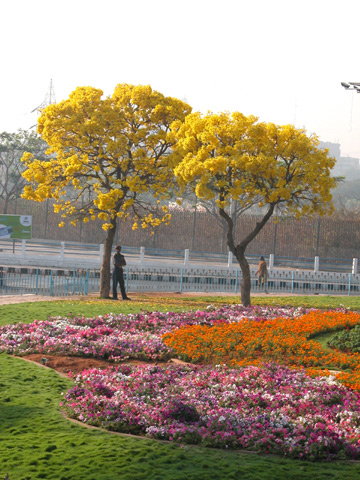
NTR Gardens

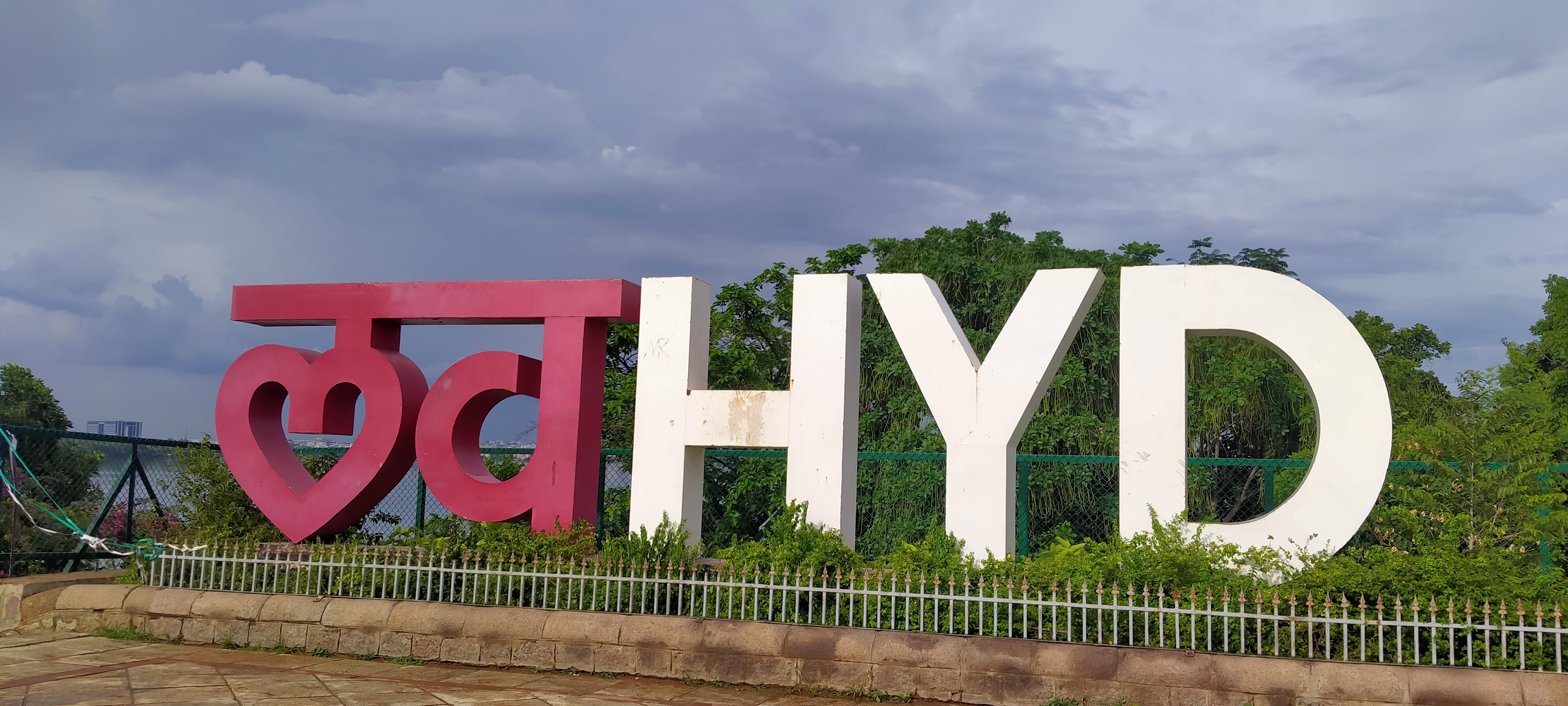
Love Hyderabad Sculpture at People's Plaza on the banks of the picturesque Hussain Sagar lake

- NTR Gardens – This leisure spot is located beside the IMAX theatre. Situated on 36 acres (150,000 m^{2}) adjoining the Hussain Sagar, these gardens provide entertainment and recreation. There are tree-top restaurants and architecture.
- Indira Park – Indira Park is situated in the Lower Tank bund of Hyderabad city. This newly built park is spread over 76 acres (310,000 m^{2}) of lush green area and it lies alongside the Hussain Sagar.
- Kotla Vijayabhaskara Reddy Botanical Gardens – These gardens located at Kondapur are spread across a sprawling area of 274 acres (1.11 km^{2}), housing different varieties of herbs, plants, trees etc. with water bodies, meadows and rich grasslands. Night Safari Park is adjacent to the gardens.
- Lumbini Park – is a small public, urban park of 7.5 acres (0.030 km2; 0.0117 sq mi) adjacent to Hussain Sagar lake in the busy Necklace Road area. It is being maintained by Buddha Purnima Project Authority since 2000. The main attractions of this park are the boat rides across the lake to give a closer glimpse of the Buddha statue of Hussain sagar lake and the 1500 seater Laserium, the first of its kind in the state. A major terrorist act took place here on 25 August 2007 in which 44 people were killed.
- Lotus Pond – is a garden built around a pond situated in Jubilee Hills, said to have been designed by an Italian designer. This garden is currently maintained by the Municipal Corporation. It is also home to a few rare species of birds.
- Mahavir Harina Vanasthali National Park – Located near Vanasthalipuram, previously it was a hunting (shikari) spot for Nizams; it is now a picnic spot. Nischalvan Eco-tourism project is located here.
- Public Gardens

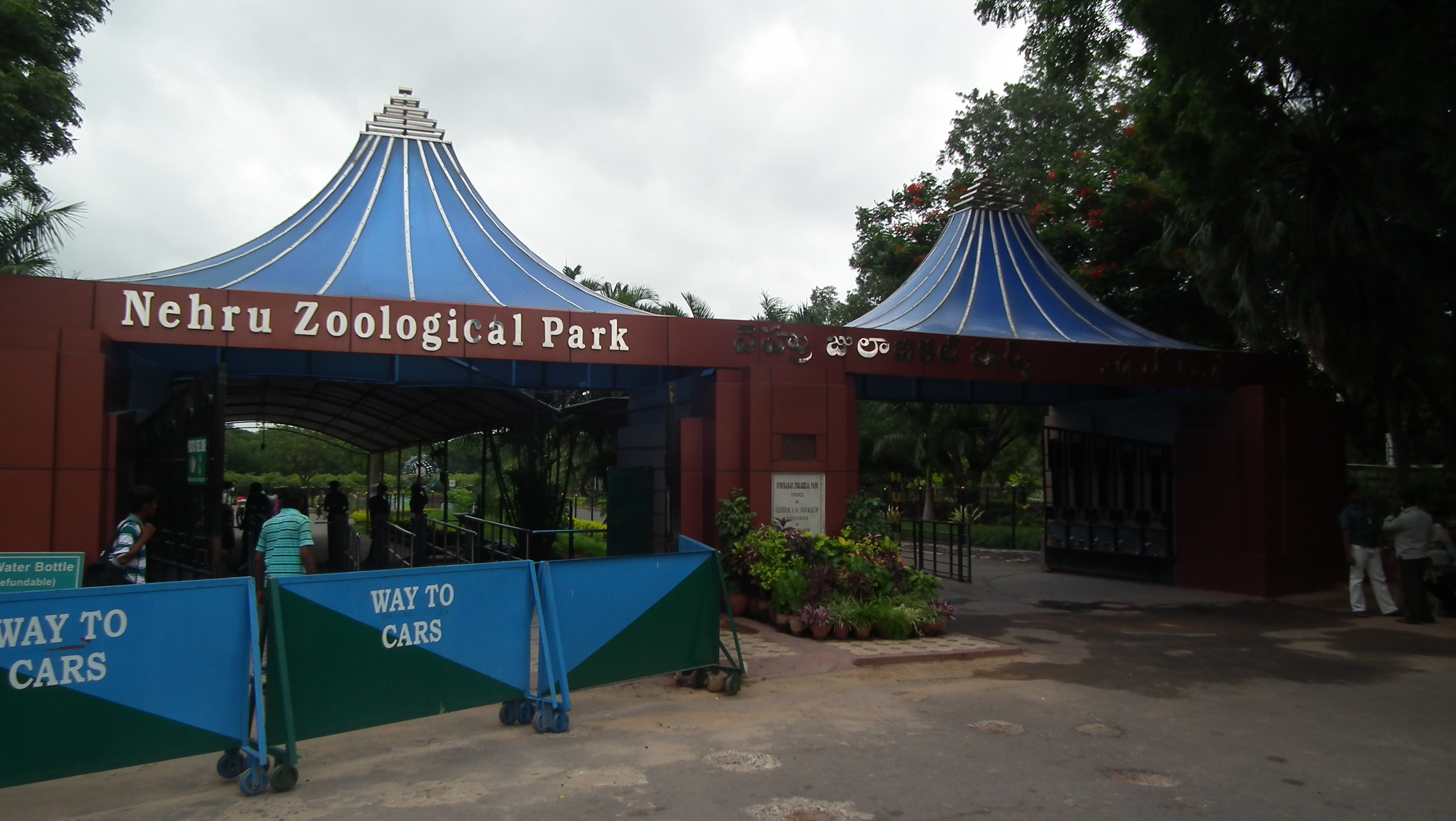
Nehru Zoological Park

- Nehru Zoological Park – This zoo is a natural habitat, occupying 380 acres, housing a large variety of animals, birds, nocturnal species, aquatic and amphibian species. Located close to the zoo is the Mir Alam Sagar, which is proposed to be converted into an Aquarium similar to that in Sentosa, Singapore. Its unique feature is the 21 in-built masonry dams that are jewel-shaped, which were built in 1804 by Henry Russle, a French engineer in British service.
- Mrugavani National Park – A sanctuary for deer and leopards, it is located en route to Chilkur. The Outer Ring Road is a flyover through this national park.
- KBR National Park – A sanctuary for peacocks and anteaters along with many other species including monkeys and snakes, the sanctuary is the green space of the richest area of the city, Jubilee Hills.

== Shopping Malls and modern places ==
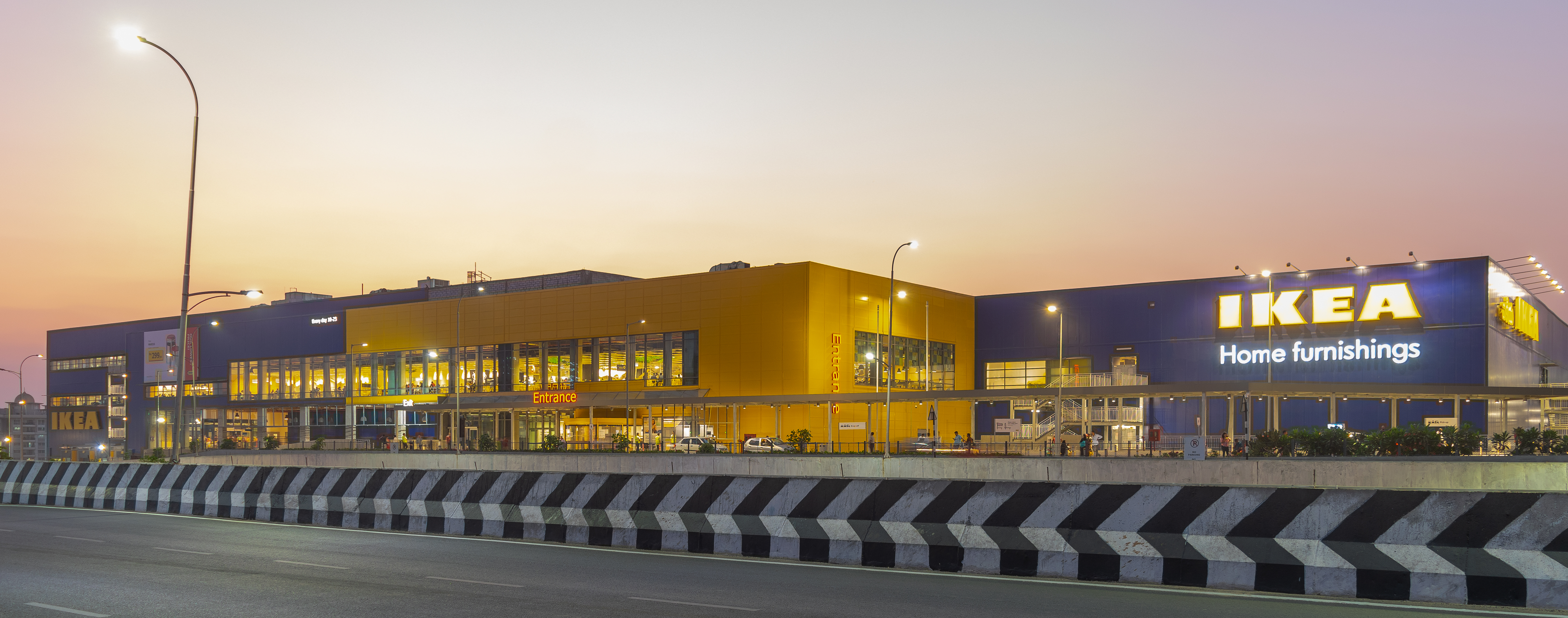
IKEA store in Hyderabad, India

- Inorbit Mall - Inorbit Cyberabad (Hyderabad) has a gross leasable area of 800,000 square feet. It was launched in 2009 and is also the biggest of all the Inorbit malls. It is located at Mindspace, Madhapur in Hitech City, Hyderabad.
- HITEC City - The Hyderabad Information Technology and Engineering Consultancy City, abbreviated as HITEC City, is an Indian information technology, engineering, health informatics, and bioinformatics, financial business district located in Hyderabad, Telangana, India.

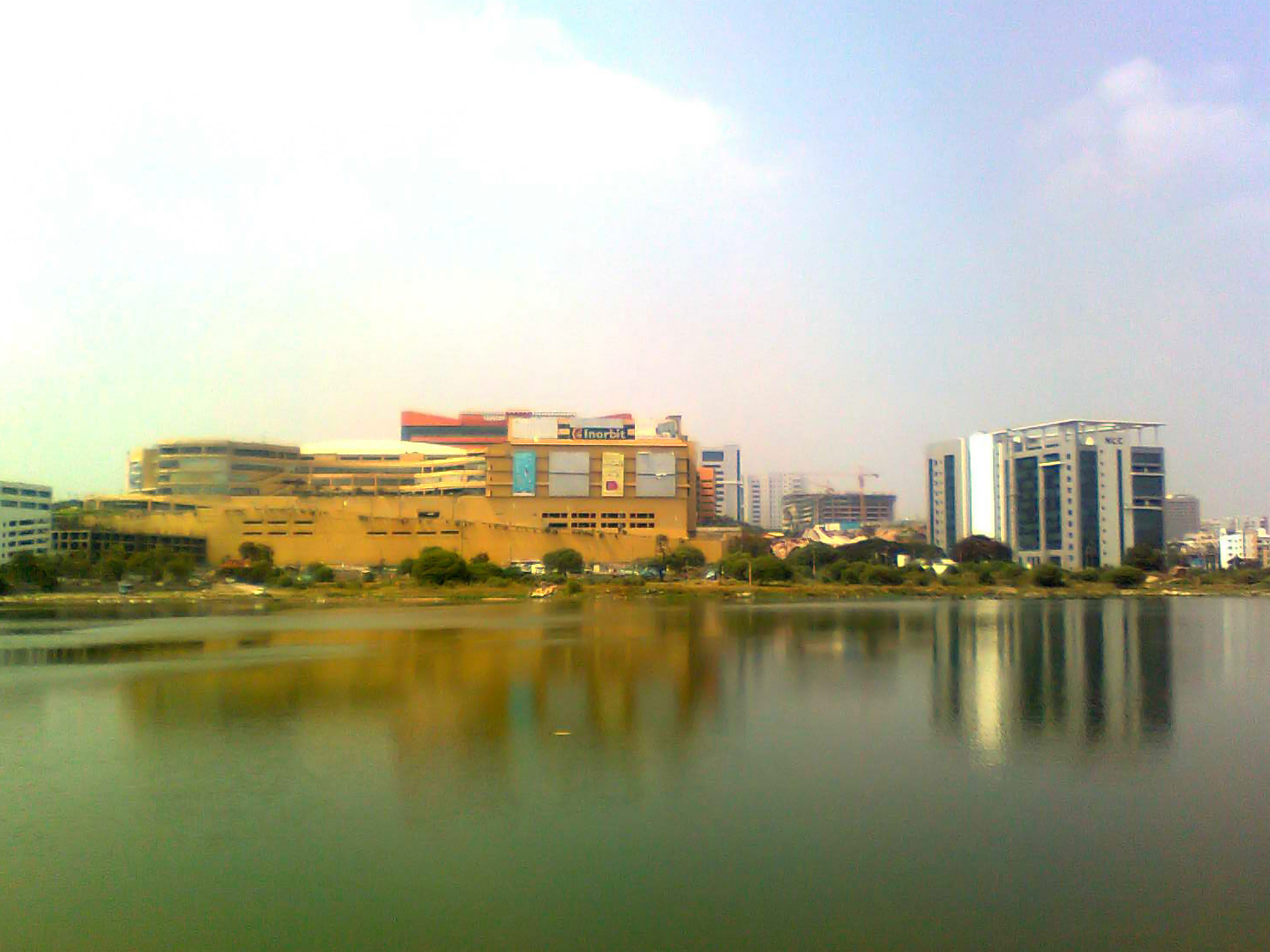
View of Inorbit Mall from Durgam cheruvu Lake

== Others ==
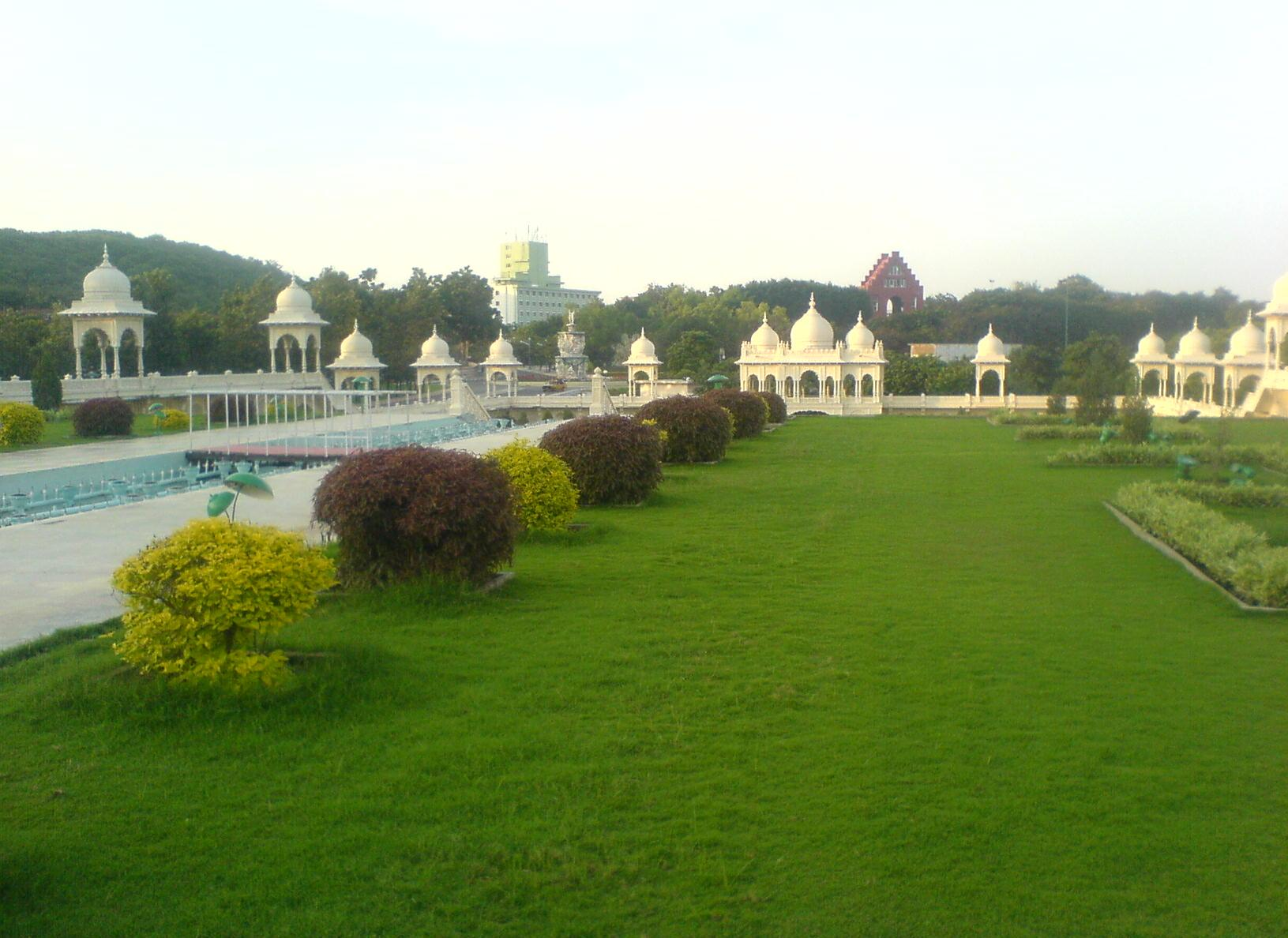
Mughal gardens at Ramoji Film City

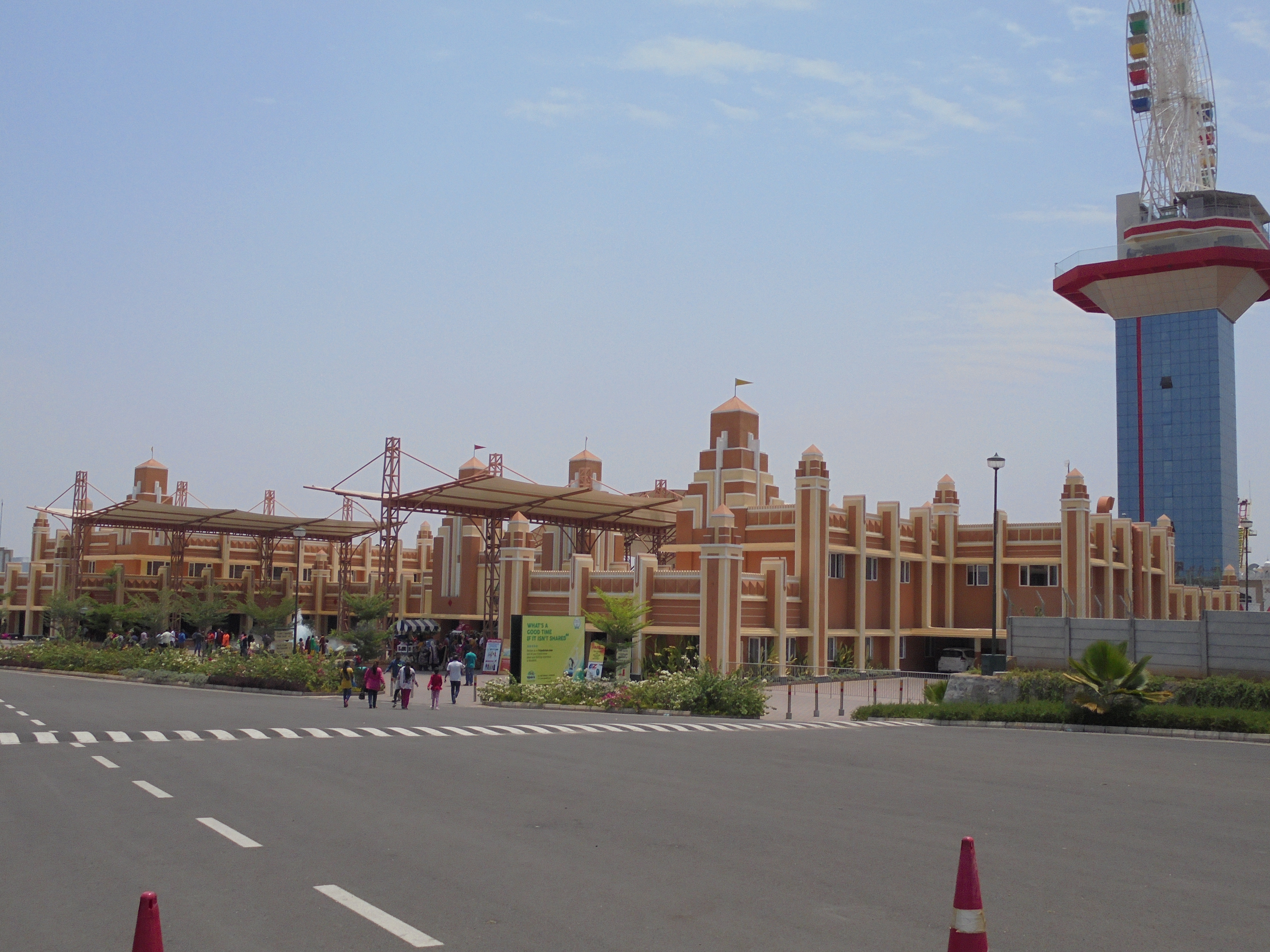
Wonderla Amusement Park, Raviryal, Hyderabad

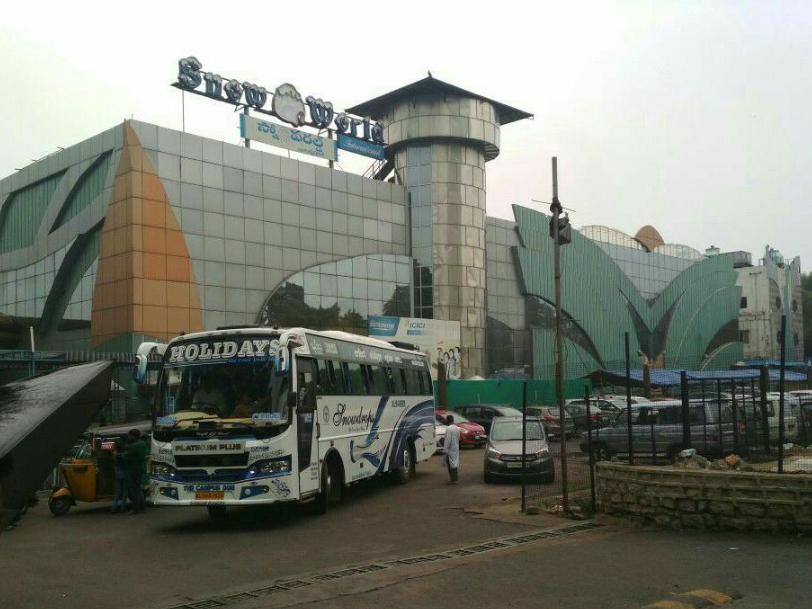
Snow World, Hyderabad

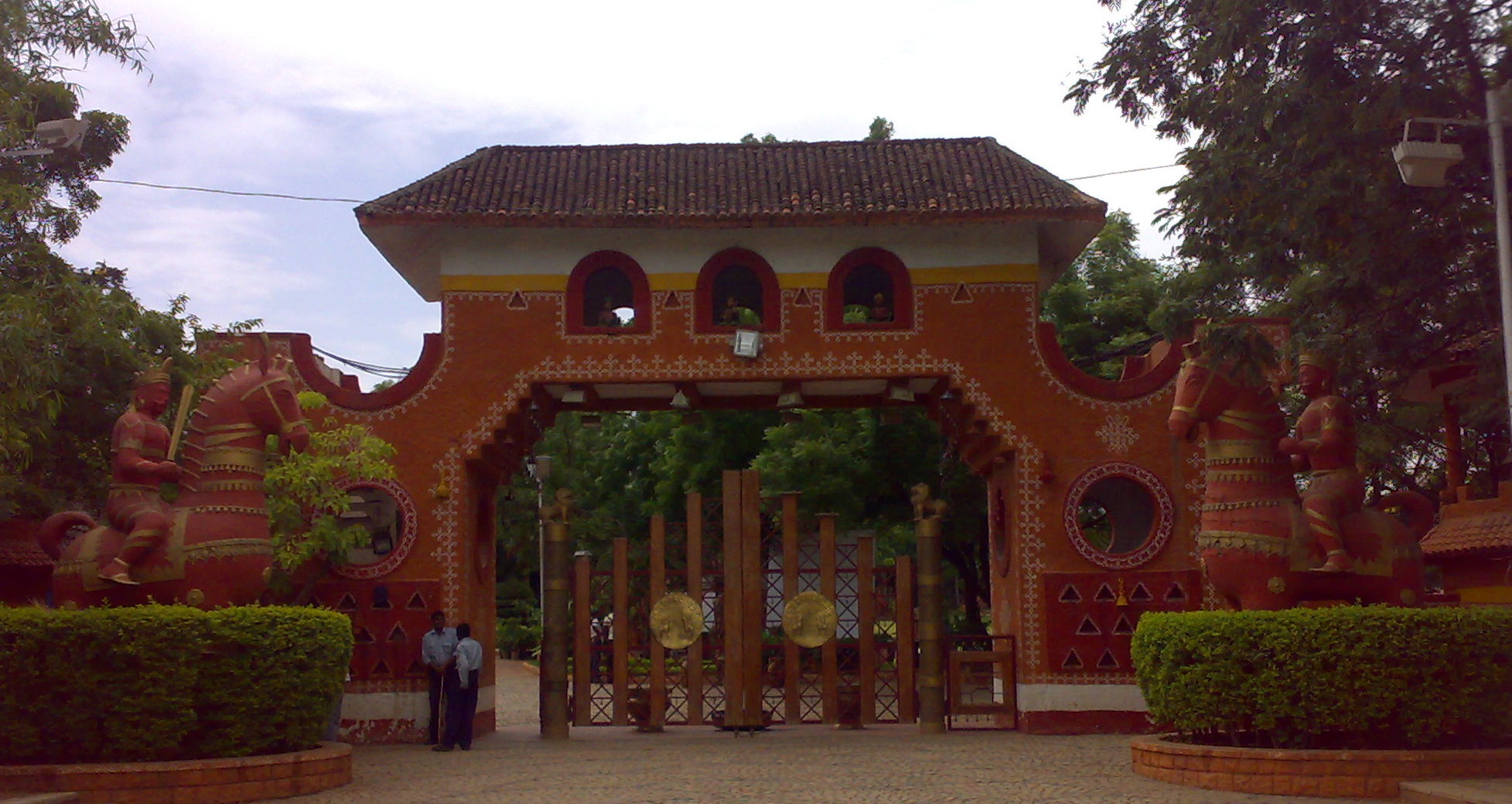
Shilparamam is an arts and crafts exposition at Madhapur

- Ramoji Film City (RFC) – It is the world's largest integrated film studio cum theme park, covering 1666 acres. It is also one of Asia's most popular tourism and recreation centres. Recently, it made its way into the Guinness Book of World Records for being the largest film studio in the world. Opened in 1996, it is about a 20-minute drive from Hyderabad on Vijayawada Highway.
- Ravindra Bharati – The stage for all performing arts, especially for those enhancing the state and Indian cultures. Shows are held almost every evening throughout the year which include musical and dance performances, drama, award ceremonies and special government events.
- Necklace road – This boulevard lies on the other side of the lake, linking the IMAX theatre and Sanjeevaiah park. This has become the-place-to-be for the Hyderabadis in the evenings. This strip has lush lawns and long rows of flower beds. The latest addition to this strip is the Jalavihar, a mini water world designed to soothe the senses. PV Ghat is also situated here, in memory of the late Shri PV Narasimha Rao.
- Wonderla Amusement Park - It was launched on January 20, 2018 by Managing Director Arun K Chittilappilly and Chief Executive Officer DS Sachdeva. Its most notable ride is Recoil, a reverse looping roller coaster.
- Snow World - It is an amusement park located in Hyderabad, Telangana, India located beside Indira Park and along the Hussain Sagar lake.
- Laad Bazaar – Also called Chudi Bazaar, this is on the west of Charminar, and is known for its bangles, jewellery and pearls.
- Hyderabad Pearls – Hyderabad has always been referred to as the "city of pearls" even though it is far away from the sea. Some of the famous pearl shops in Hyderabad are in Charminar, Begumpet and M G Road.
- Shilparamam- located opposite Cyber Towers, HITEC city, it is an arts and crafts village conceived for the preservation of traditional crafts such as sculpting from stone, weaving in cotton, silk and gold thread, Dhaka muslin, Kondapalli toys, Bankura horses, gudda-guddis of Punjab, temple arts and other Indian arts and crafts. Close to this is the Shilpakala vedika, a conference hall built with ethnic decor. Mini Shilparamam, a smaller version of Hitec City's Shilparamam which is very near to Nagol metro Station is inaugurated in Uppal on 22 June 2019
- Keesara – located east of Hyderabad. One can see the ruins of Chalukyan Era on the hill and in the museum located here. It is presently famous for its Shiva temple.
- Rachakonda – Located 30 km from Hyderabad, it was once the capital city of Velama kings who ruled during and after kakatiyas up to the rise of Qutubshahis. It is about 40 km from Golkonda fort.
- Treasure Island
- Sudha Cars Museum

== Tourism of Telangana ==
- Heritage structures in Hyderabad

== Outline of tourism in India ==
- List of World Heritage Sites in India
- List of national parks of India
- List of lakes of India
- List of waterfalls in India
- List of State Protected Monuments in India
- List of beaches in India
- Incredible India
- List of Geographical Indications in India
- Medical tourism in India
- List of botanical gardens in India
- List of hill stations in India
- List of gates in India
- List of zoos in India
- List of protected areas of India
- List of aquaria in India
- List of forts in India
- List of forests in India
- Buddhist pilgrimage sites in India
- Hindu pilgrimage sites in India
- List of rock-cut temples in India
- Wildlife sanctuaries of India
- List of rivers of India
- List of mountains in India
- List of ecoregions in India
- Coral reefs in India
- List of stadiums in India
