= Mrugavani National Park =

National park of India

- IUCN category II (national park)
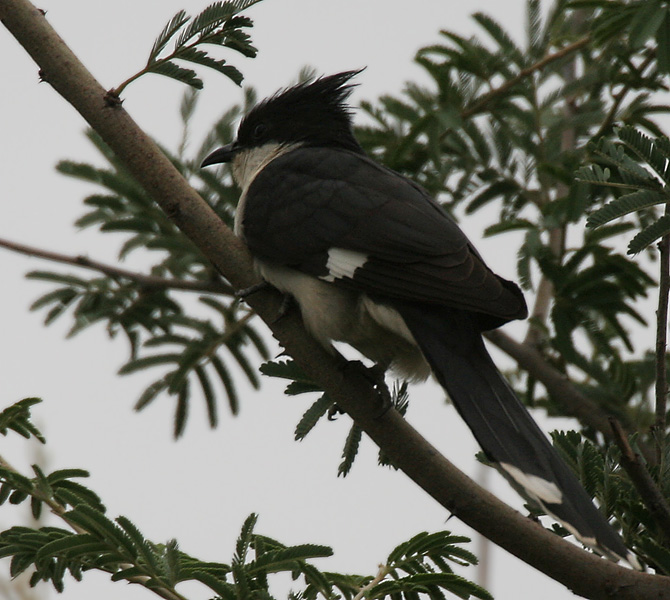
- Pied Cuckoo at Mrugavani National Park

- Location within Telangana Location within India
- Interactive map of Mrugavani National Park
- Location: Chilkur near Hyderabad, Telangana
- Nearest city: Hyderabad
- Coordinates: 17°21′19″N 78°20′17″E
- Area: 1,211 acres (4.90 km^{2})
- Created: 1994

Mrugavani National Park is a national park located in Hyderabad, Telangana State, India. It is situated at Chilkur in Moinabad mandal, 20 km from MGBS and covers an area of 3.6 square kilometres (1.4 sq mi) or 1211 acres. It is home to a 600 different types of plant life. The Park is home to around 350 spotted deer. The animals include: indian hare, Jungle cat, civet, Indian rat snake, Russell's viper, chital and the flower pecker.

== Flora and Fauna ==
=== Flora ===
Some of the plants that are found in the park are

- Teak
- Bamboo
- Sandalwood
- Ficus
- Palash and
- Rela.

==== Other flora ====
The plant species include bryophytes, Pteridophytes, Herbs, Shrubs, Climbers and Trees. The vegetative cover presents a mosaic of woodland and grasslands. The plants of the park is of tropical waterless deciduous forest of degraded nature.

=== Fauna ===
==== Mammals ====
The mammals which are found here are

- Chital
- Sambar
- Wild boar
- Jungle Cat
- Civets
- Indian Grey Mongoose

==== Reptiles ====
Some of the reptiles that are found in the park are given below-

- Indian Python
- Russell's Viper
- Monitor Lizard
- Rat Snake
- King Cobra

==== Birds ====
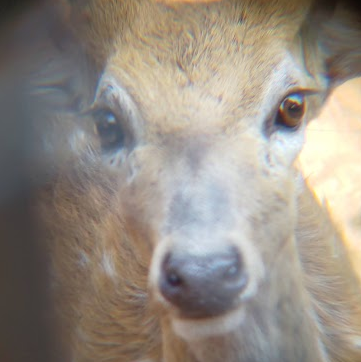
Chital

Apart from the varied flora and fauna the Mrugavani National Park boasts of more than 100 species of birds including warblers, peacocks, babblers, koels, lapwings, and flowerpeckers.

== Park-specific Information ==
The park was declared as a national park in 1994.

The climate here is pleasant most of the time. There is a point in the park which is at a height for high point views and there is also a watch tower so as to watch animals closely.

There is also a library and Education center in regard to the Environment a museum and auditorium which exhibits wildlife. Visitors may also go for safari rides for those willing to get closer to the park's denizens, besides nature walks with guides.

The topography of Park supports woodlands, grasslands and rocky areas. Most of the vegetation can be classified as southern tropical dry deciduous forests. The Park does the significant job of conserving the near disappearing native flora of Hyderabad region.

The undulating topography shows the rocky side of the formation of the Deccan trap.

== Seasons ==
Winter – November to February

Summer – March to May

Monsoon – June to October

Average rainfall: 300 to 750 mm

Temperature: Maximum 40 °C, Minimum 10 °C

Coordinates: 17° 21’ 27.79″ N, 78° 20’ 26.91″ E

== Location ==
The Park is in near Chilkur Balaji Temple, about 20 km by road from MGBS

== See also ==
- Mahavir Harina Vanasthali National Park
- Jawahar Deer Park
- Kothwalguda Eco Park
