= Chilkur =

Chilkur may refer to

- Chilkur Balaji Temple
- Chilkur, Ranga Reddy district
- Chilkur, Suryapet district
