= Alwal Lake =

Alwal lake
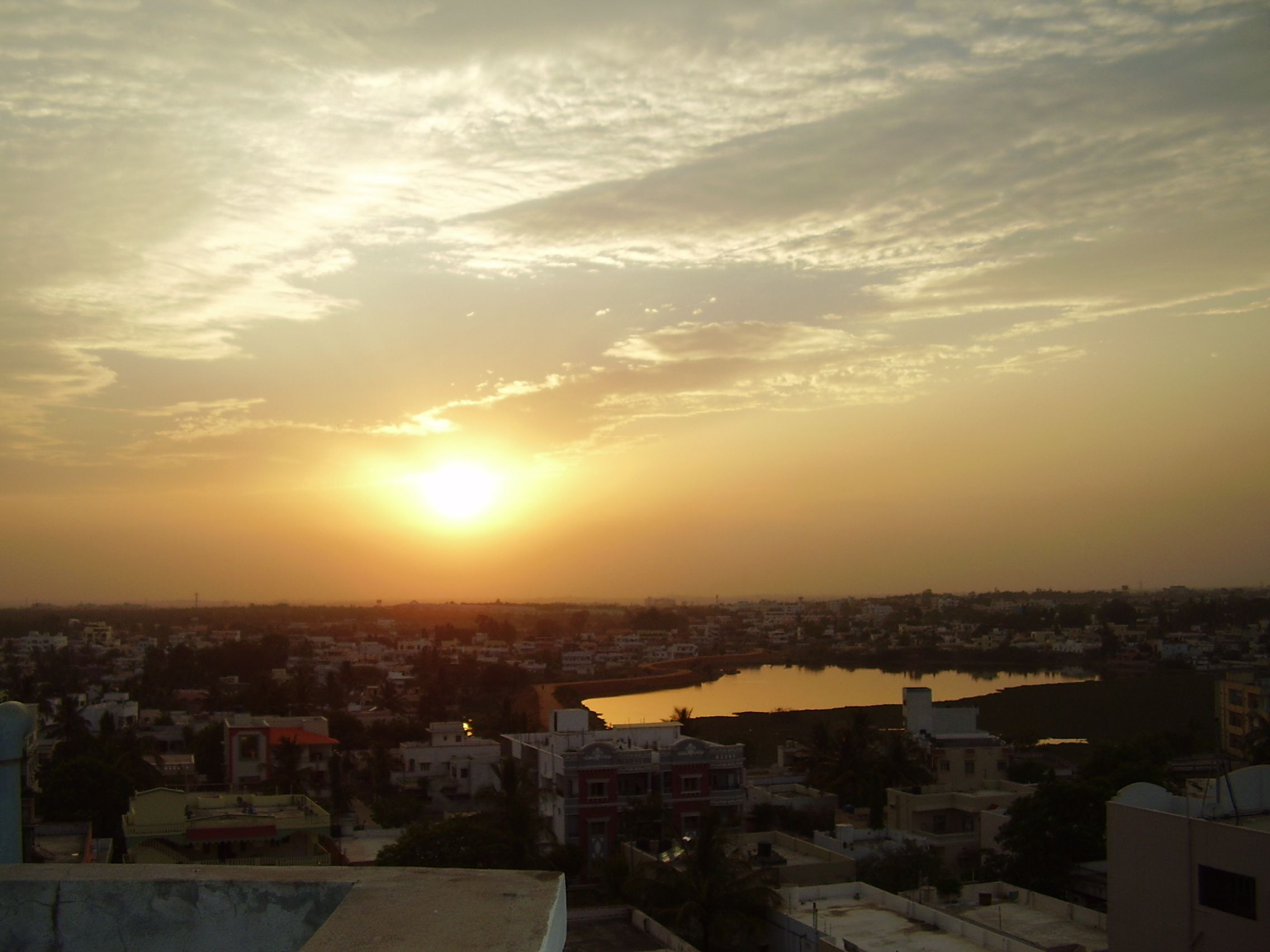
- Alwal Cheruvu

- Location within Telangana
- Location: near Hyderabad
- Coordinates: 17°30′28″N 78°30′41″E
- Type: reservoir
- Basin countries: India
- Settlements: Secunderabad, Hyderabad

Alwal Lake is an artificial lake near Hyderabad, India, about 8 kilometers north of Secunderabad. It is situated in Alwal. There were many issues associated with the lake, including water supply concerns, which made a highly tense situation for the Alwal Municipality Officials.

== Location ==
The lake is in the heart of Alwal town, located near the secunderabad-Mumbai Railway track. The lake has a clear view from the railway track and also from the Alwal Railway Station. There is a road along the lake which gives the complete and close view of the lake.

== Usage ==
The lake is used for many different purposes. During Ganesh Chaturthi, the Ganesh idols are immersed in the lake. At that time, the road near the lake is facilitated with extra lights, with extra police posted for controlling the crowd.

Many birds and animals reside near the lake, and this provides a fine view in the evening.

== See also ==
- Osman Sagar
- Himayat Sagar
- Shamirpet Lake
- Alwal
- Hyderabad city lakes
