= Umda Sagar Lake =

Lake in Hyderabad, India

- Location within Hyderabad Location within Telangana Location within India
- Location: Hyderabad, India
- Coordinates: 17°17′37″N 78°27′25″E

Umda Sagar Lake is located in the midst of Old City Hyderabad, India. The lake is one of four within Hyderabad, along with Shamirpet, Mir Alam, and Hussain Sagar (the last being largest at 275 km^{2}). In 1954 the lake was described as being 8 miles south of the city.

It was constructed during the reign of the Hyderabad Nizam.
