= Kolthur =

Kolthur Kolthur
- Village
- Country: India
- State: Telangana

Languages
  - Official: Telugu
- Time zone: UTC+5:30 (IST)
- Telephone code: 08418
- Vehicle registration: TS 08 XXXX
- Sex ratio: 1:1(approx) ♂/♀

Kolthur is a village in Medchal Malkajgiri district in Telangana, India. It falls under Shamirpet mandal
