= Jaganguda =

- Village
- Country: India
- State: Telangana

Government
  - Type: Local
  - Body: Gram Panchayat

Area
  - Total: 2 km^{2} (0.77 sq mi)

Population (2001)
  - Total: 4,000
  - Density: 2,000/km^{2} (5,200/sq mi)

Languages
  - Official: Telugu
- Time zone: UTC+5:30 (IST)
- Postal code: 500078
- Telephone code: 08418
- Vehicle registration: 26 X XXXX
- Sex ratio: 1:1(approx) ♂/♀

Jaganguda is a village in Medchal district in Telangana, India. The village area is 2 km². It falls under Shamirpet mandal. The village surpanch is Vishnuvardan and MPP Mrs. Murali.
