= Dharma samsthapana =

Dharma Samsthapana is a Social Service Movement (SSM) formed initially to protect Chilkuru Balaji Temple from commercialization by the Endowments Department.

Chilkur Balaji Temple of Hyderabad the most ancient temple in north part of Andhra pradesh i.e. Telangana, was built during the days of Akkanna and Maadanna, the uncles of Bhakta Ramdas. The deity in this temple is Swayambhu and is accompanied with Sridevi and Bhoodevi, both standing besides the deity.

== Support to handloom weavers Industry ==
Supports Sircilla weavers. The NGO supports environment development.

The temple has introduced a dress code. Starting April 2008, Devotees are requested to wear handloom clothes on Saturdays. Lakhs of weavers in and around sircilla handloom industry are committing suicides. The dress code has been introduced to encourage handloom industries in these area of Andhra Pradesh. and also to protect polluting the environment with plastic, Chilkur Balaji Temple banned using plastics in the temple area and introduced hand weaved bags with the help from Sircilla handloom weavers.
