= Surangal =

Surangal Suniganti
- Village
- Nickname: Suniganti
- Location in Telangana, India
- Coordinates: 17°18′N 78°16′E
- Country: India
- State: telangana
- District: Ranga Reddy
- Metro: Ranga Reddy district
- Established: 1990
- Founder: Nomaan khateeb

Government
  - Body: Chevella Mandal Office

Telugu, Deccani urdu Languages
  - Official: Telugu
- Time zone: UTC+5:30 (IST)
- Postal code: 501504
- Planning agency: Panchayat
- Civic agency: Mandal Office

Surangal is a village and panchayat in Ranga Reddy district, Telangana India. It falls under Moinabad mandal.
