= Pothaipalle =

- Village
- Country: India
- State: Telangana

Population (2012)
  - Total: 5,000

Languages
  - Official: Telugu
- Time zone: UTC+5:30 (IST)
- Telephone code: 040
- Vehicle registration: AP-26 X XXXX
- Sex ratio: 1:1(approx) ♂/♀

Pothaipalle or Pothaipally is a village in the Rangareddy district of Telangana, India. It falls under the Shamirpet mandal.
