= Jawahar Deer Park =

Deer park at Shamirpet, Telangana

- Location: Shamirpet Telangana, India
- Nearest city: Secunderabad
- Area: 54 acres (22 ha)
- Governing body: HMDA

Jawahar Deer Park, also Shamirpet Deer Park, is a deer park located in Shamirpet, Medchal–Malkajgiri district, Telangana, India. The Park is spread over 54 acres and has over 100 deer. It is close to Shamirpet Lake, plenty of deer can be seen going down to the water to quench their thirst.

== The Park ==
The Park has over 100 deer, peacocks and different birds. The Deer park is maintained by the Government of Telangana. It is also home to one of the two Butterfly parks in Hyderabad, the other being Mrugavani National Park.

== See also ==
- Mrugavani National Park
- Mahavir Harina Vanasthali National Park
