= Statue of Equality (Ramanuja) =

Statue of Ramanuja in Hyderabad, India

Statue of Equality (Ramanuja Statue)
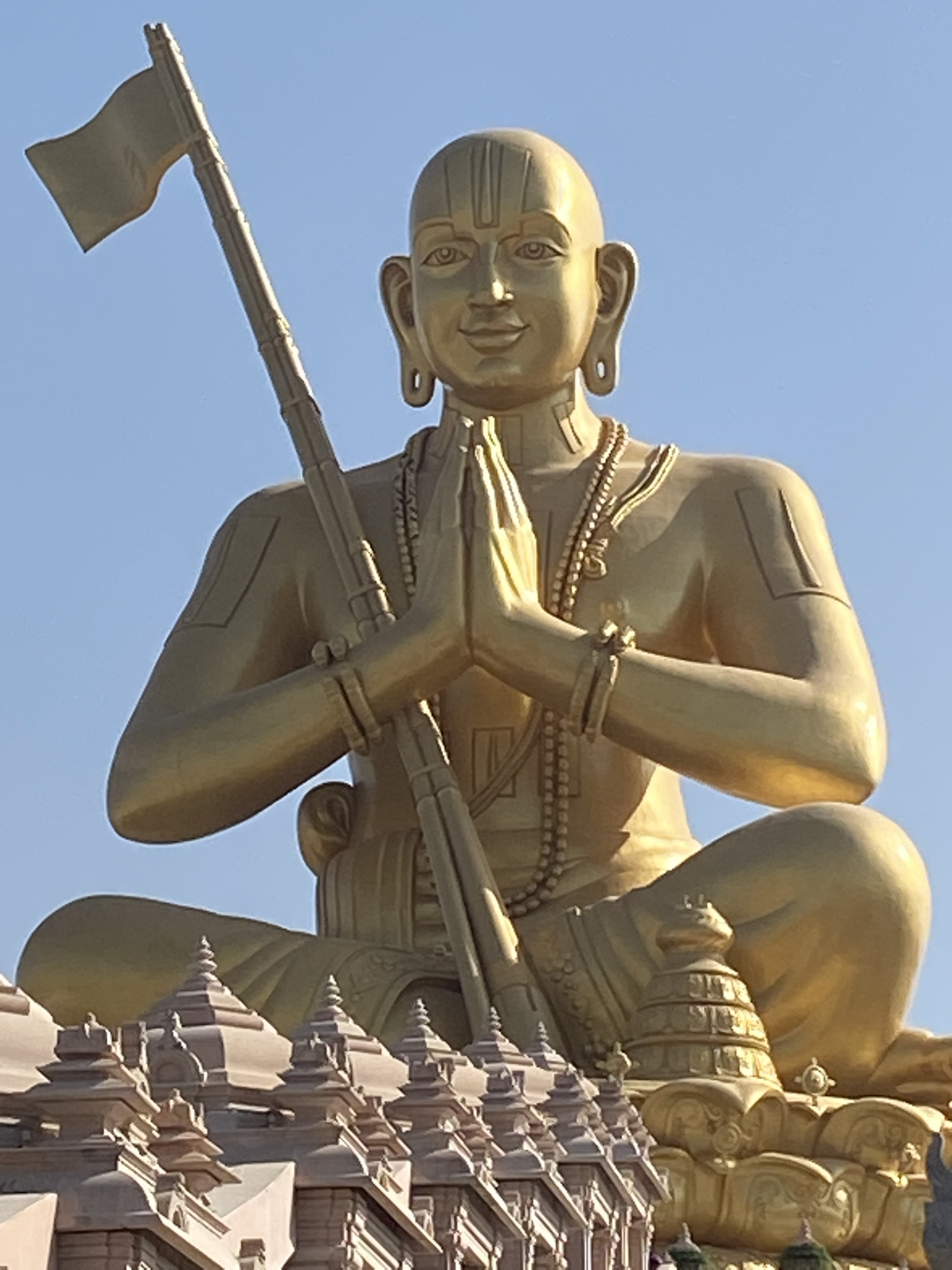
- Ramanuja statue
- Interactive map of Statue of Equality (Ramanuja Statue)
- Location: Muchintal, Hyderabad, Telangana, India
- Coordinates: 17.1860°N 78.3332°E
- Designer: DNV Prasad Sthapathi
- Type: Statue
- Material: Steel Framing, Panchaloha
- Height: 66 metres (216 ft)
- Beginning date: 2 May 2014
- Inauguration date: 5 February 2022; 4 years ago
- Dedicated to: Ramanuja
- Website: www.statueofequality.org

The Statue of Equality is a statue of the 11th-century Indian philosopher Ramanuja, located on the premises of the Chinna Jeeyar Trust at Muchintal, Ranga Reddy district in the outskirts of Hyderabad. It is the second tallest sitting statue in the world. The project of building the statue was conceptualised by the trust to commemorate the 1,000th birth anniversary of Ramanuja. Costing an estimated ₹1,000 crore (US$100 million), the project was paid for through monetary donations by devotees in a major part.

== Design and construction ==
=== Design ===
In 2014, ascetic Chinna Jeeyar came up with the idea to commemorate the 1000th anniversary of Ramanuja's teachings by building a statue. Later DNV Prasad Sthapathi appointed as Chief Architect for the project and completed all initial drawings under the Chinna Jeeyer Guidance. The ground floor will be 6,000 square metres and will depict Ramanuja's life and philosophy. The temple, meant for daily worship, will be located on the 27,870 square metre second floor. The 1,365 square metre third floor will include a Vedic digital library and research centre. An Omnimax theatre in the shape of a planetarium featuring life stories of Ramanuja was planned. 14 models were designed according to Agama Shashtra and Shilpa Shastras. 3 models were shortlisted, and improvements were made using 3D scanning technology.

It was named 'Statue of Equality' by the trust.

=== Funding ===
The statue was built at an estimated cost of ₹1,000 crore (US$100 million), which is majorly collected from donations by the devotees.

=== Construction ===
The foundation stone for the statue was laid by Chinna Jeeyar. The statue was expected to be ready by November 2017 and later revised by February 2019. Aerosun Corporation, a Nanjing-based company in China, was contracted in August 2015 for the construction of the statue. The final design model was 3D scanned and sent to Aerosun Corporation to be built. 700 tonnes of panchaloha, a five-metal alloy of gold, silver, copper, brass and zinc was used to build the statue. It was built in China and later shipped in 1600 individual pieces to India via Chennai Port in 54 shipments. Around 60 Chinese specialists including workers, engineers and welders assembled the segments on site. The assembly progressed during 2017 and 2018 and took 15 months to complete and was assembled on site in Muchintal, Hyderabad. Aerosun Corporation provided a guarantee of 20 years for the golden hue of the statue.

The base building under the statue named Bhadravedi is 16 metres (54 ft) tall and three-stories high. Atop the building lies a lotus of 8.2 metres (27 ft) in diameter, and is carried by 36 elephants, over which the statue sits. The diameter of the lotus represents 24 tattvas, as well as soul, god and the guru. The statue has a concrete core which is surrounded by a panchaloha sheet with a thickness varying between 10 mm and 20 mm. The base building has a meditation hall where a 54 inches (1.4 m) statue of Ramunuja made of 120 kg of gold, representing the years he lived, is installed. 108 divyadesams (model temples), built in stone, surround the statue.

The statue was inaugurated by Indian Prime Minister Narendra Modi on 5 February 2022. The smaller golden statue inside the base building was inaugurated by President Ram Nath Kovind on 13 February 2022.

== Features ==
The Statue of Equality is the second tallest sitting statue in the world. The base building hosts a vedic digital library, research centre, ancient Indian texts, theatre and a gallery. Ramanuja's works are presented in the gallery.

== See also ==
- List of tallest statues
