= Chilkur, Ranga Reddy district =

Chilkur
- village
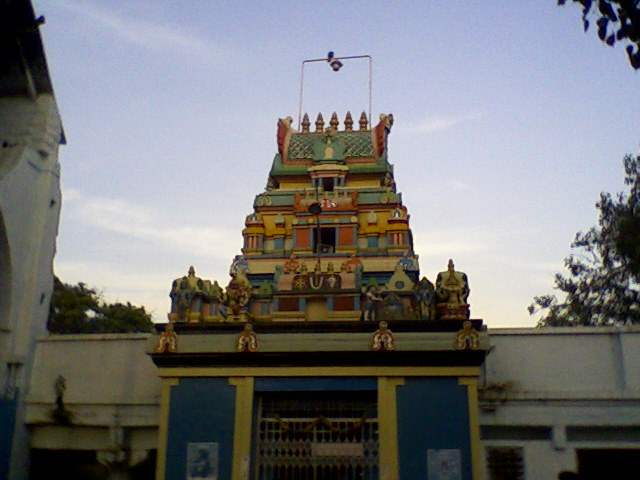
- Gopuram at Chilkur Temple

- Location in Telangana, India Chilkur (India)
- Coordinates: 17.350475°N 78.28612°E
- Country: India
- State: Telangana
- District: Ranga Reddy
- Established: 1 C.E

Government
  - Type: Panchayath
  - Body: Mandal Office

Area
  - Total: 31.5 km^{2} (12.2 sq mi)

Population
  - Total: 7,756
  - Density: 246/km^{2} (638/sq mi)

Languages
  - Official: TeluguTelugu
- Time zone: UTC+5:30 (IST)
- Postal code: 501504
- Vehicle registration: TS
- Planning agency: Panchayat
- Civic agency: Mandal Office
- Website: telangana.gov.in

Chilkur or Chilkoor is a village and panchayat in Ranga Reddy district, Telangana, India. It comes under Moinabad mandal. The popular Chilkur Balaji Temple and Mrugavani National Park are located here. Chilkur is a biggest and most populated village in Moinabad Mandal.

Chilkur village was established near 1500 years ago. It was under rule of Chalukyas, Rastrakutas, kakatiyas, Quthubshahis, Nizams. Archeological department has done excavations in this village after 1948. So many old inscriptions were found and they have been moved to Golconda archeological museum. According to these inscriptions in this village so many Hindu, Buddhist and Jain temples, A rigid Fort were constructed. Invadors demolished and looted these temples. We can still see many temples like Chenna Keshava, Mallikharjuna and fort Burjus in the village today.
