= Kothwalguda Eco Park =

Bird sanctuary in Hyderabad, India

- Interactive map of Kothwalguda Eco Park
- 17.31588°N 78.37321°E
- Date opening: 6 March 2026
- Location: Hyderabad, India
- Land area: 85 acres (34 ha)
- No. of animals: 6500
- Major exhibits: Deccan Birds Aviary; Elevated boardwalk Themed gardens

Kothwalguda Eco Park (officially known as the Kothwalguda Eco-Hill Park) is an 85 acres (34 ha) nature-themed recreational and ecological tourism destination located near the Himayat Sagar reservoir in Hyderabad, India. It was developed by the Hyderabad Metropolitan Development Authority (HMDA) at an estimated cost of Rs. 75 crore.

The park's primary attraction is the Deccan Birds Aviary, which is the world's largest aviary with a 6 acres (24,000 m^{2}) walk-through avian enclosure. The aviary currently houses approximately 6,500 birds with a maximum capacity of 8,000 birds. The park also features a 1.5 km (0.93 mi) elevated wooden boardwalk, which is the longest elevated boardwalk in India.

== History ==
The Eco Park was conceptualized by the Government of Telangana to expand eco-tourism options around Hyderabad's periphery and also to protect the catchment area of the Himayat Sagar reservoir. Construction of the park started in October 2022. The park was officially inaugurated on 6 March 2026.

== Exhibits and Attractions ==
=== Deccan Birds Aviary ===
The most popular attraction of the park is the Deccan Birds Aviary, a 6 acres (24,000 m^{2}) walkthrough enclosure which is the largest of its kind in the world. It was modeled after global free-flight sanctuaries such as the Birds of Eden and Jurong Bird Park aviaries, which allow visitors to interact directly with wildlife without separating bars.

The Deccan Birds Aviary features a butterfly-shaped structural mesh design. It houses approximately 6,500 birds, including exotic native species from four continents – Africa, South America, and Australia. The aviary has specialized habitats for non-local species such as rainbow lorikeets, macaws, and tropical finches.

=== Elevated Boardwalk ===
The 1.5-kilometer elevated broadwalk which runs through the park is the longest of its kind in India. It features a 2.5 m (8.2 ft) wide structure made from eco-friendly composite wood and is raised to an elevation of 30 ft (9.1 m) above the ground, offering panoramic views of both the park landscape and the adjacent Himayat Sagar reservoir.

=== Themed Gardens and Flora ===
The park integrates major botanical collections designed for both ecological preservations and aesthetics. It features over 1 million individual plants across 188 distinct flora species. The park features:

- Japanese Garden: A zone that focuses on Zen aesthetics, water features, and manicured shrubs.
- Butterfly Garden: Designed with host and nectar plants to cultivate butterflies and other native pollinator populations.
- Rock Garden: A conservation zone featuring drought-resistant, low-water succulents and scrub flora native to the Deccan region.
- Erosion Control Belts: Utilizes 15 species of soil-binding creepers to prevent soil runoff into the reservoir catchment area.

== Conservation and Education ==
Similar to international models like the former Jurong Bird Park, the Kothwalguda Eco Park serves an educational role in the Hyderabad metropolitan region. The open-flight nature of the aviary serves to promote avian biological awareness. The park has sustainable infrastructural elements incorporated into its design, including a network of electric vehicles for visitors and an arrival plaza structure built using natural Konkan bamboo.

== See Also ==
- Hyderabad Botanical Garden
- Kasu Brahmananda Reddy National Park
- Birds of Eden
- Jurong Bird Park
