= Mahavir Harina Vanasthali National Park =

National park in Hyderabad, India

- IUCN category II (national park)
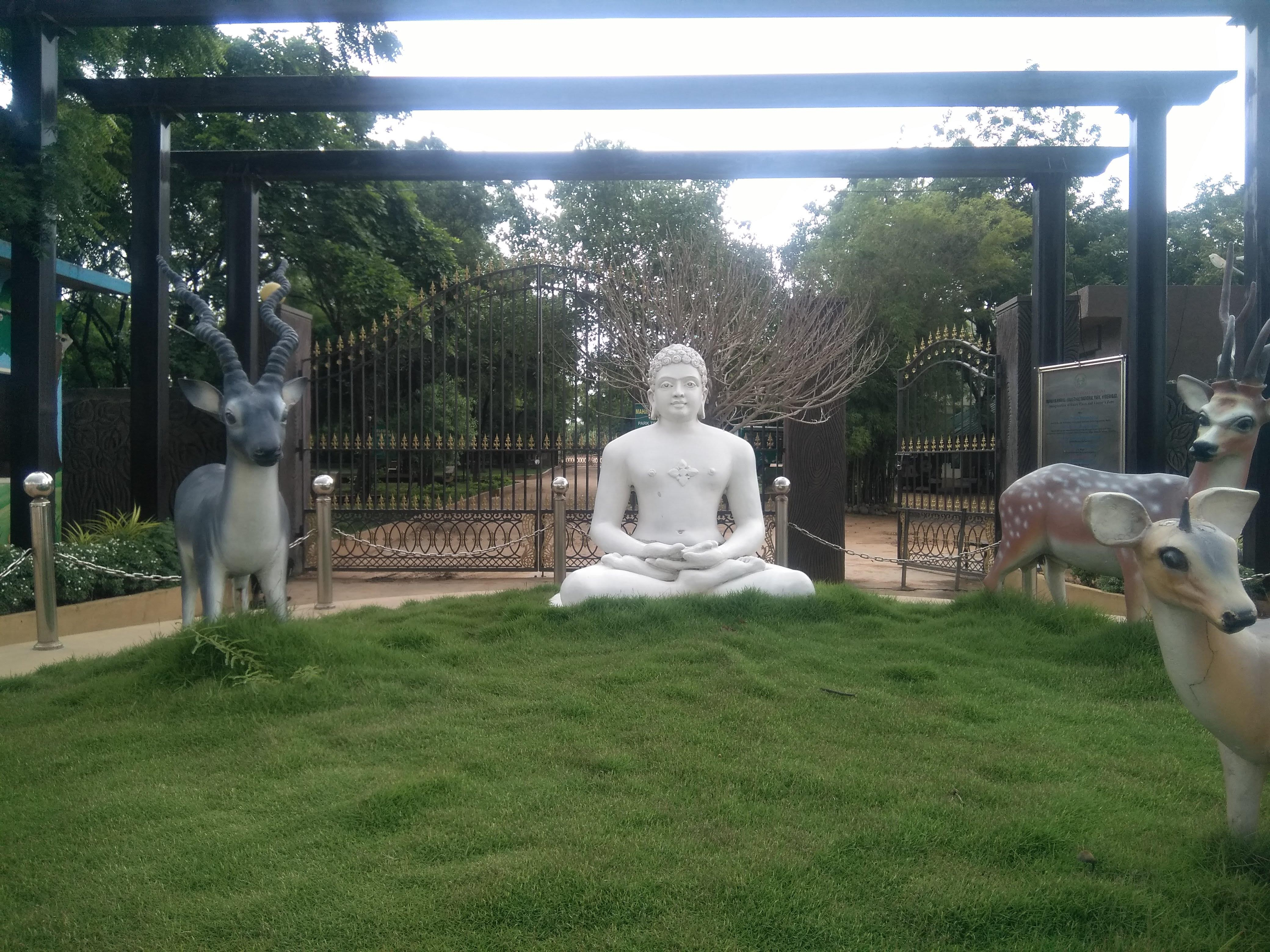
- Entrance gate with idol of Mahavira

- Location within Telangana Location within India
- Interactive map of Mahavir Harina Vanasthali National Park
- Location: Telangana, India
- Coordinates: 17°36′N 78°47′E
- Area: 14.59 km^{2} (5.63 sq mi)
- Established: 1975

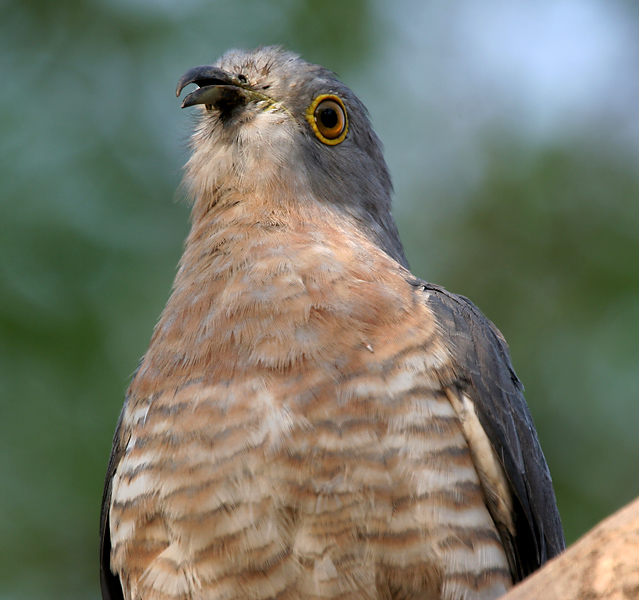
Common hawk cuckoo Cuculus varius

Mahavir Harina Vanasthali National Park is a deer national park located in Vanasthalipuram, Hyderabad, Telangana, India. It is spread over 3605 acres. It is the largest green lung space in the city of Hyderabad.

== History ==
The park was named after Mahavir, the 24th Tirthankara of Jainism, in commemoration of his 2500th nirvan anniversary in the year 1975. The place where the park is located was once a private hunting ground for the Nizam, rulers of Hyderabad. A deer park was set up in order to preserve this precious heritage and rehabilitate it.

== The Park ==
Animals living in this national park include a few hundred blackbucks (the state animal of Andhra Pradesh), chitals, porcupines, water monitors, short-toed eagles, Indian pond herons, egrets, kingfishers, cormorants and several other bird species.

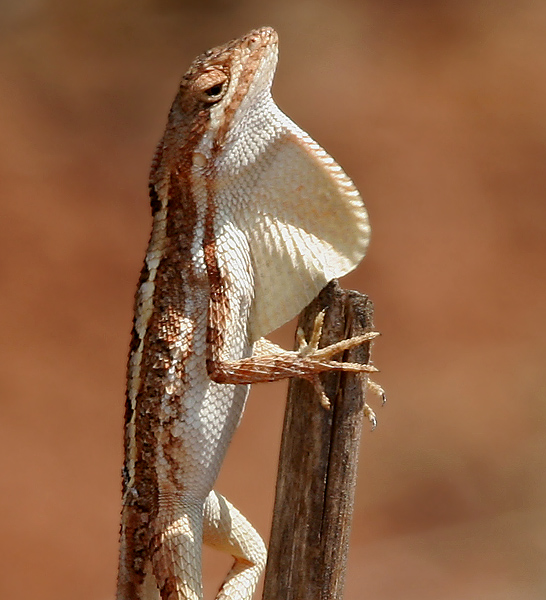
Fan-throated lizard Sitana ponticeriana

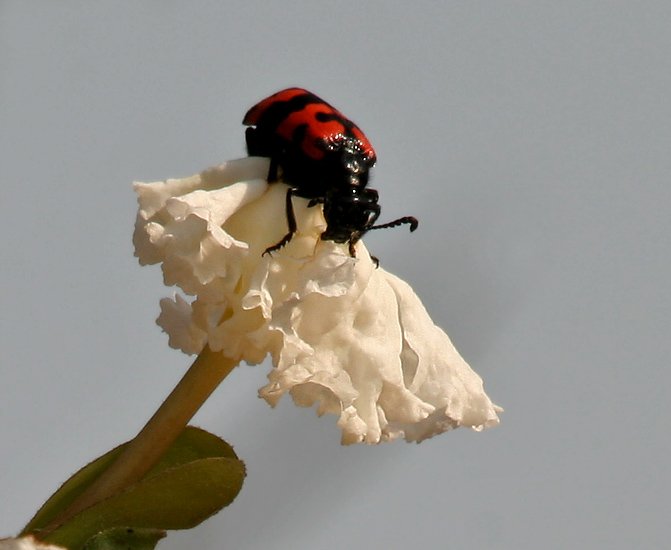
Orange blister beetle Mylabris pustulata

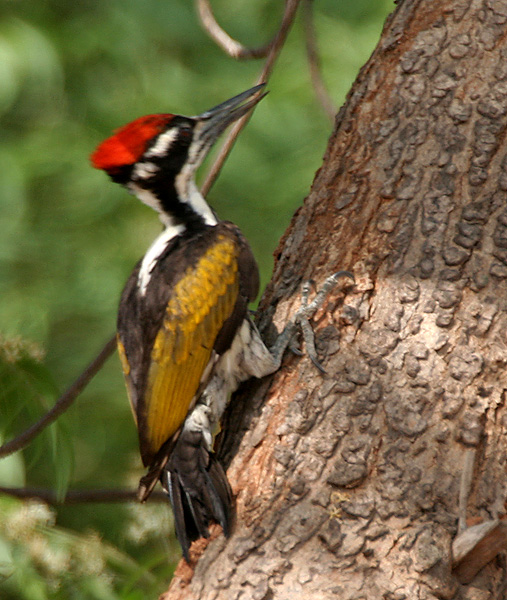
White-naped woodpecker Chrysocolaptes festivus

== Ecotourism ==
Mahavira Harina Vanasthali is located in the outskirts of Hyderabad, on Hyderabad - Vijayawada road. It is easily approachable from the city. The park is maintained by the TS Forest Department. Guided tours are available within the park.

There is an entry fee for people who wish to enter the park by safari vehicle to view the animals. The entry fee details are available at the park web portal

== Flora ==
- Dry deciduous forest mixed with scrub jungle and grasslands
- Sandalwood, rosewood, palas, amalthas, albizzias, acacias, teak
- The terrain varies from hilly to gently rolling.

== Fauna ==
- Panther, black buck, cheetal deer, wild boar, civet, porcupine, peacock
- There are 30 species of reptiles and over 120 species of birds.

== See also ==
- Mrugavani National Park
- Jawahar Deer Park
- Kasu Brahmananda Reddy National Park
