= Vanasthalipuram =

- Neighbourhood
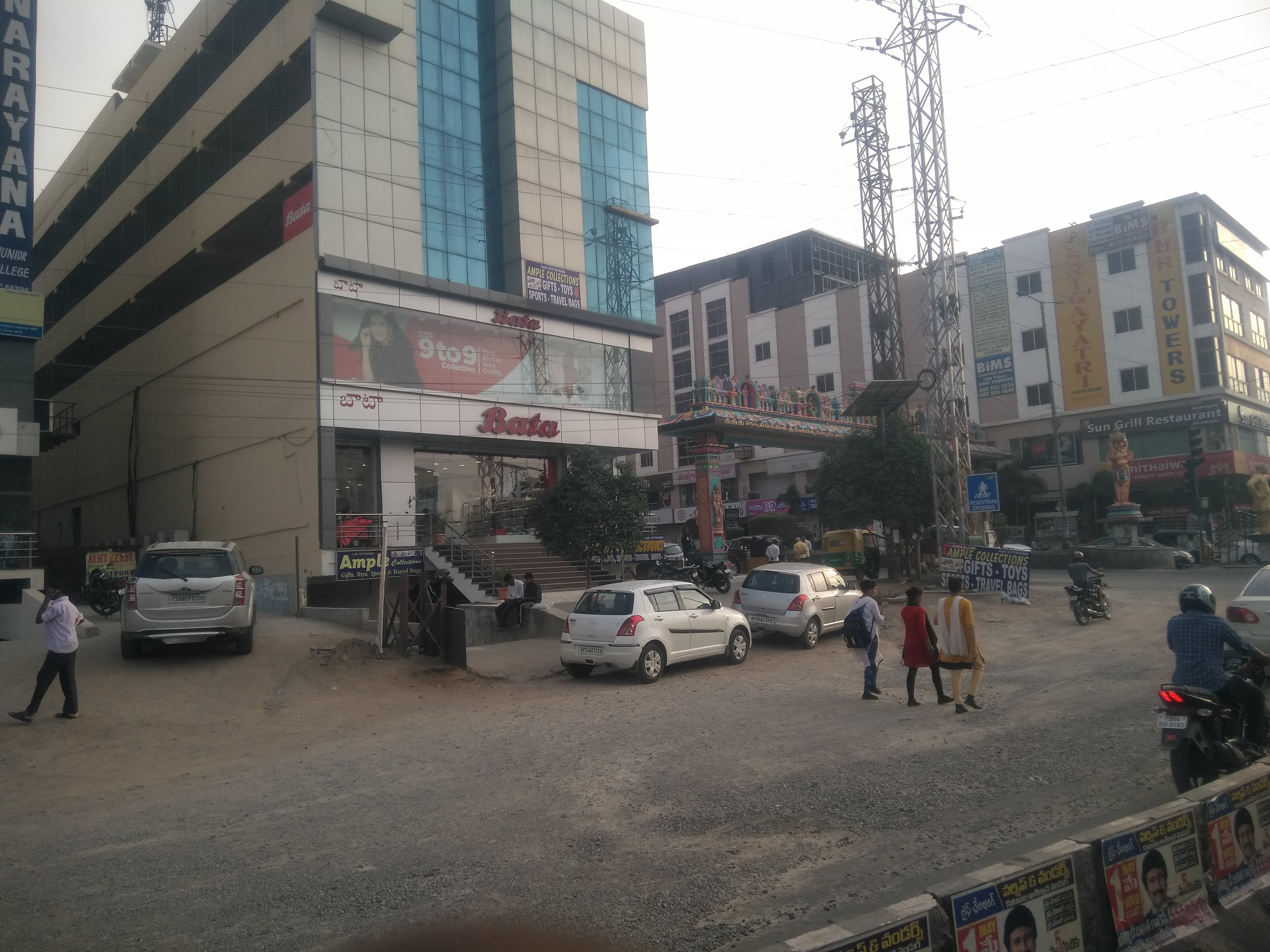
- A street in Vanasthalipuram

- Location in Telangana, India Vanasthalipuram (Telangana) Vanasthalipuram (India)
- Coordinates: 17.3319543°N 78.575337°E
- Country: India
- State: Telangana
- District: Ranga Reddy
- City: Hyderabad
- Revenue Mandal: Hayathnagar
- Elevation: 566 m (1,857 ft)

Population (2011)
  - Total: 33,814

Languages
  - Official: Telugu
- Time zone: UTC+5:30 (IST)
- Vehicle registration: TS

Vanasthalipuram is a residential neighborhood in Hyderabad, Telangana, India. It comes under Hayathnagar Mandal and Hayathnagar Revenue Division in L.B. Nagar zone along the highway towards Vijayawada a During the rule of the Nizam of Hyderabad, the area was a dense forest with wild animals and famous as a hunting ground, hence the name Vanasthalipuram (Vana="forest"+sthali="place"+puram-a locality or site). Vanasthalipuram derived its name from Harini Vanasthali, a deer park located beside national highway. It was originally known as Shikharghar. Now, Vanasthalipuram is famously known as retirees paradise. With booming IT in Hyderabad and TCS opening its south operations in Adibatla (close to Vanasthalipuram), the place is seeing an unprecedented real estate boom. Settlers from Andhra Pradesh population is more in vanasthalipuram.

== Landmarks ==
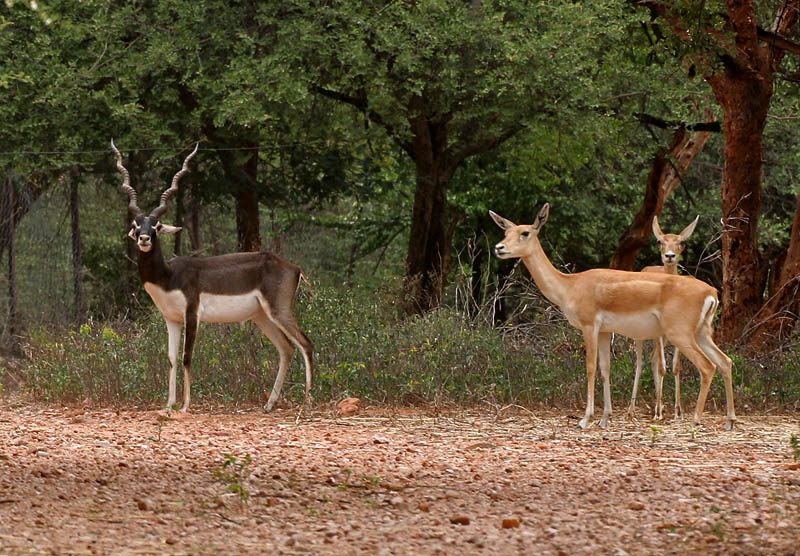
Blackbucks at the Mahavira Harina Vanasthali

Mahavira Harina Vanasthali (deer park), Red Tank, Raitu bazar, Saheb Nagar Trinetra Hanuman Temple, Venkateswara Swamy temple and Ganesh Temple are some of the major attractions of this area.
