= Himayat Sagar =

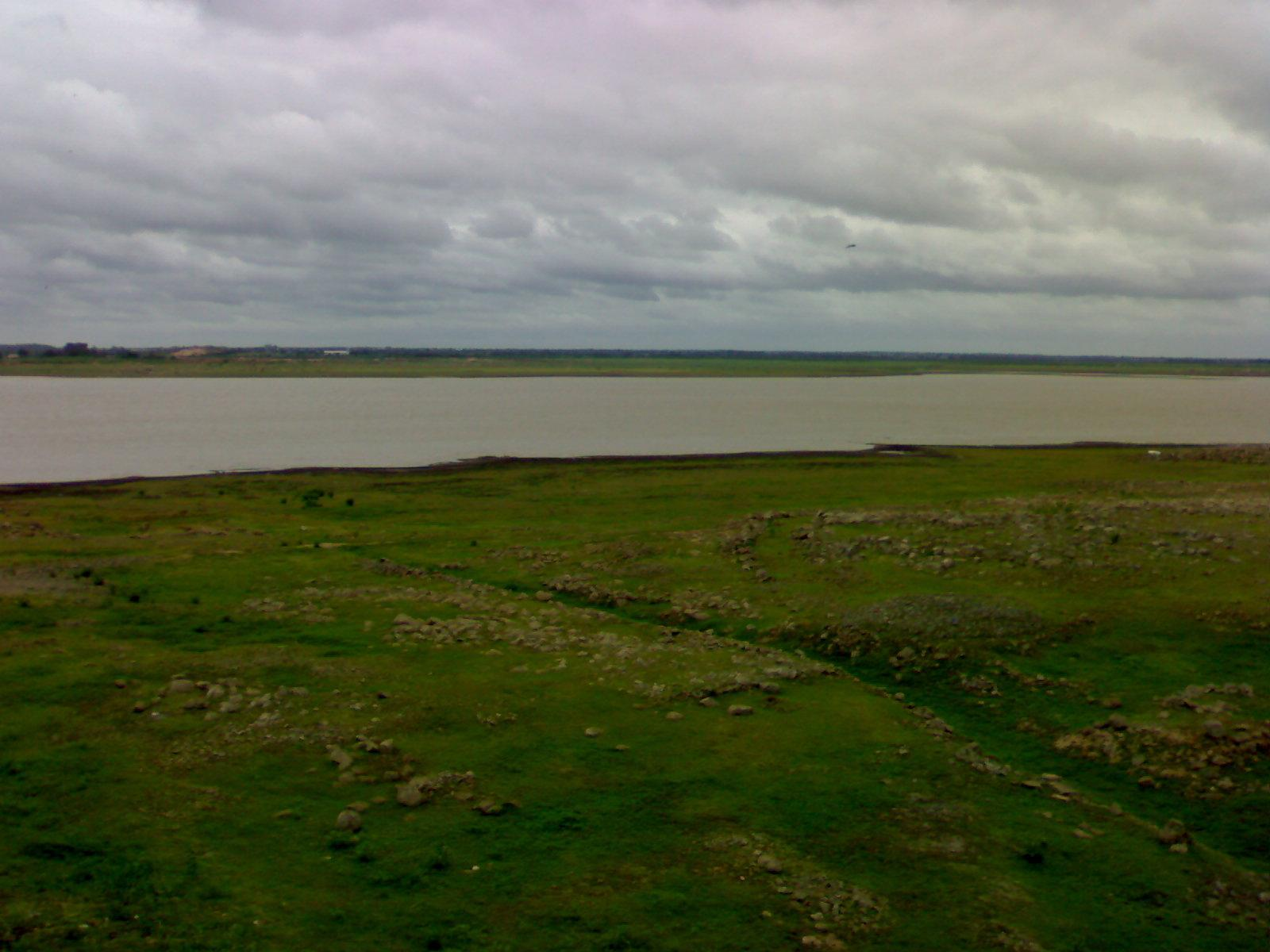
- View of Himayat Sagar

- Himayat Sagar within Hyderabad Himayat Sagar (India)
- Official name: Himayat Sagar
- Country: India
- Location: Ranga Reddy, Telangana, India
- Coordinates: 17°18′N 78°21′E
- Purpose: Multi-purpose
- Status: Operational
- Construction began: 1920
- Opening date: 1927; 99 years ago
- Construction cost: ₹ 93 Lakh (As on 1920's)
- Owner: Government of Telangana
- Operator: Hyderabad Metropolitan Water Supply and Sewerage Board

Dam and spillways
- Type of dam: Barrage
- Impounds: Esi River – a tributary of Musi
- Height (foundation): 33.832 metres (111.00 ft)
- Height (thalweg): 4.572 metres (15.00 ft)
- Length: 2.255 kilometres (1.401 mi)
- Elevation at crest: 537.514 metres (1,763.50 ft)
- Spillways: 17 Gates
- Spillway capacity: 1,60,000 cusecs

Reservoir
- Creates: Himayat Sagar
- Total capacity: 84,016 cubic metres (Reduced capacity due to silt accumulation); 120,374.915 cubic metres (During 1927)
- Catchment area: 688.937 km^{2} (266.000 sq mi)
- Surface area: 19.6839 km^{2} (7.6000 sq mi)

Himayat Sagar is an artificial lake about 20 kilometres (12 mi) from Hyderabad in the Ranga Reddy district of Telangana, India. It lies parallel to a larger artificial lake called Osman Sagar. The storage capacity of the reservoir is 84,016 cubic metres.

== History ==
The construction of reservoirs on the Esi, a tributary of the Musi River, was completed in 1927, with the intention of providing a drinking water source for Hyderabad and protecting the city from floods, which Hyderabad suffered in 1908. It was built during the reign of the last Nizam of Hyderabad, Nizam VII and is named after his eldest son Himayat Ali Khan.

The Himayat Sagar dam and Osman Sagar reservoirs provided continuous water supply to the twin cities of Hyderabad and Secunderabad until recently. Due to population growth, they are not sufficient to meet the cities' water supply-demand.

The engineer at the time of construction was late Khaja Mohiuddin, son of Mohammed Hussein, Madri.

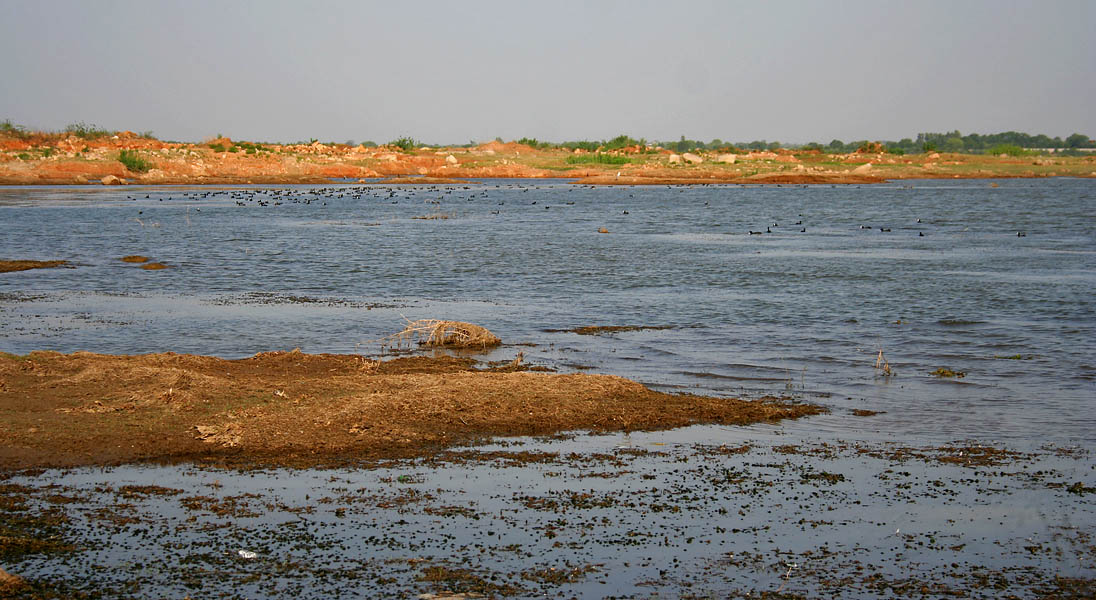
Himayat Sagar Lake

In 2022, the descendant of the royal family of the Nizam, Himayat Ali Mirza, joined the movement to save Osman Sagar and Himayat Sagar" as he believes that these reservoirs are iconic landmarks of Hyderabad and still act as a lifeline for lakhs of people of the old city. He also urged the then-CM of Telangana to withdraw the repeal of GO 111.

If GO 111 is repealed, Himayat feared that many parts of the city might be affected by floods even with small summer rains. Also, it would increase the illegal construction activities near the lake, ultimately increasing the threat of flooding. In December 2023, the current Chief Minister A.Revanth Reddy decided to keep on hold the repeal of GO 111.

== Parks and conservation areas ==
The area surrounding the Himayat Sagar reservoir forms a critical ecological buffer zone for Hyderabad, featuring several protected green spaces, parks, and wildlife areas that mitigate the impacts of rapid urban expansion. These recreational and ecological sites serve both as public amenities and as urban biodiversity hotspots:

- Kothwalguda Eco Park: Developed by the Hyderabad Metropolitan Development Authority (HMDA) adjacent to the reservoir, this 85-acre (34 ha) eco-tourism facility features a 1.5-kilometre (0.93 mi) elevated wooden boardwalk—the longest in India—that overlooks the landscape and provides panoramic views of Himayat Sagar. Its primary ecological attraction is the Deccan Birds Aviary—a 6-acre dome-shaped, walk-through enclosure that houses over 6,500 exotic birds is the largest aviary in the world. The park also features a variety of themed botanical spaces, including a Japanese garden, a rock garden, and a butterfly zone.
- Mrugavani National Park: Situated in close proximity to the Himayat Sagar reservoir near Chilkur, this national park spans an area of approximately 1,211 acres (4.90 km²). It serves as a prominent wildlife refuge and conservation zone, and is home to a wide variety of native Deccan flora and fauna, including chital (spotted deer), sambar deer, and numerous species of resident and migratory birds.
- Himayat Sagar Mini Zoo / Deer Park: Located along the peripheral boundary of the lake, this mini-zoo and deer park functions as a specialized conservation enclosure aimed at maintaining native deer populations and raising environmental awareness among visitors.
- Ecotourism and Local Reserves: The peripheral wetland habitats and small streams feeding into Himayat Sagar support native fish populations like Channa harcourtbutleri and various aquatic insect groups. The surrounding green cover acts as a necessary eco-barrier to control pollution run-offs into the city's drinking water source.
