= Muchintal =

- Village
- Muchintal
- Interactive map of Muchintal
- Country: India
- State: Telangana

Area
  - Total: 7.46 km^{2} (2.88 sq mi)

Population (2011)
  - Total: 2,577
  - Density: 345/km^{2} (895/sq mi)

Languages
  - Official: Telugu
- Time zone: UTC+5:30 (IST)

Muchintal is a village in Ranga Reddy district in Telangana, India. It falls under Shamshabad mandal.
