= Shamirpet Lake =

Shamirpet lake Pelle Cheruvu
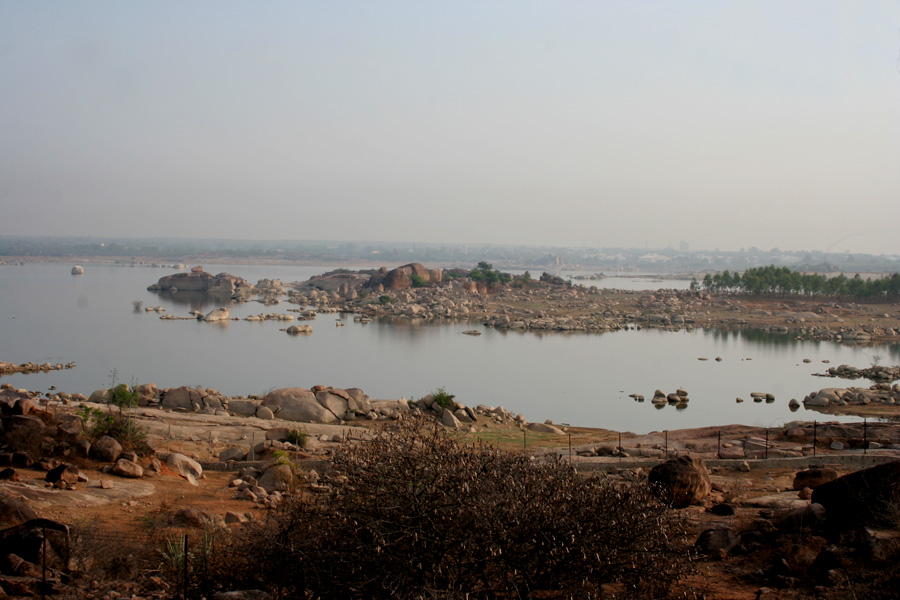

- Location within Telangana
- Location: Shamirpet, Hyderabad
- Coordinates: 17.610°N 78.563°E
- Type: Reservoir
- Basin countries: India
- Surface area: 1,200 acres (4.9 km^{2})
- Average depth: 13 ft (4.0 m; 2.2 fathoms)
- Max. depth: 32 ft (9.8 m; 5.3 fathoms)
- Water volume: 0.25×10^{6} ft^{3} (10×10^{6} L)

Shamirpet Lake also known as Pelle Cheruvu is an artificial lake near Hyderabad, India, it is about 24 kilometres (15 mi) north of Secunderabad.

== History ==
It was built during the Nizam era in the 19th century. Mehboob Ali Pasha the Sixth Nizam popularised the lake amongst his guests and selected it as the best place around Hyderabad to watch the sunset. The lake, similarly to other lakes built during the Qutub Shahi and Asaf Jahi periods, was interconnected to Musi to prevent flooding.

== Today ==
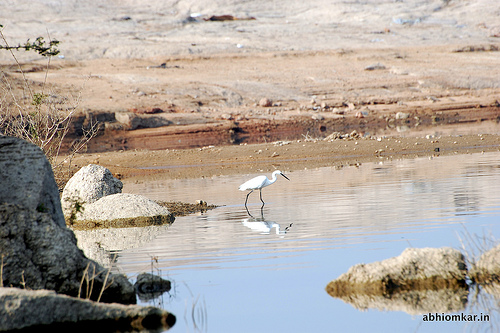
A common egret at Shamirpet Lake

The lake was once used for fishing and was also visited by migratory birds during winter. Today, the lake is gradually shrinking and only 40% of the area remains. The channels that used to connect the lake to various other water bodies are today blocked due to encroachment. It is reported that due to haphazard development, encroachment and degradation of biodiversity of the area around the lake, a general declining trend is seen in the visit of migratory birds to the various lakes around Hyderabad. However no statistics or studies specific to this lake is carried out to date.

There are many resorts and private dhabas around the lake. Institutes such as NALSAR University of Law, Institute of Public Enterprise and Birla Institute of Technology and Science are also situated near the lake. The area around the lake is being developed as picnic spot. Many Telugu films were shot there. Jawahar Deer Park, which contains many deer, peacocks and different birds, is also near to the lake.

As there were many cases of drowning, the place is also patrolled by police. Warning boards have also been erected by the authorities.

== See also ==
- Osman Sagar
- Himayat Sagar
- Shameerpet
