= Shamirpet =

- District Headquarters, suburb, Major Grama Panchayathi,
- Shameerpet
- Location in Telangana, India Shamirpet (Telangana) Shamirpet (India)
- Coordinates: 17°35′42.335″N 78°34′27.803″E
- Country: India
- State: Telangana
- District: Medchal-Malkajgiri district
- Metro: Hyderabad Metropolitan Region
- Established: New date

Government
  - Type: Gram Panchayat
  - Body: Shamirpet Grama Panchayathi

Area
  - District Headquarters, suburb, Major Grama Panchayathi,: 146.17 km^{2} (56.44 sq mi)

Population (2020)
  - District Headquarters, suburb, Major Grama Panchayathi,: 93,865
  - Density: 642/km^{2} (1,660/sq mi)
  - Metro: 250,000

Languages
  - Official: Telugu, Urdu
- Time zone: UTC+5:30 (IST)
- PIN: 500078
- Vehicle registration: TS-08

Shamirpet is a major revenue village panchayat, and also a suburb of Hyderabad city and district headquarters of Medchal-Malkajgiri district of the Indian state of Telangana. It is also the mandal headquarter of Shamirpet mandal in Keesara revenue division. Many clubs and resorts such as Aalankrita 4-star resort, Leonia Holistic Destination, Celebrity Resorts, Darling Caves, Honeyberg Resort etc., are located here.

It is a part of Hyderabad Metropolitan Area.

It is home to Shamirpet lake, Jawahar Deer Park, Genome Valley, NALSAR University of Law, Institute of Public Enterprise, BITS Pilani - Hyderabad
