= Chilkoor Balaji Temple =

Hindu temple in Telangana, India

Chilkur Balaji Temple

- Location within Hyderabad

Religion
- Affiliation: Hinduism
- Deity: Lord Venkateswara

Location
- Location: Chilkur Village, Gandipet, Ranga Reddy District, Telangana
- State: Telangana
- Country: India
- Coordinates: 17°21′30″N 78°17′55″E

Architecture
- Completed: 14th century

Website
- chilkurbalaji.com

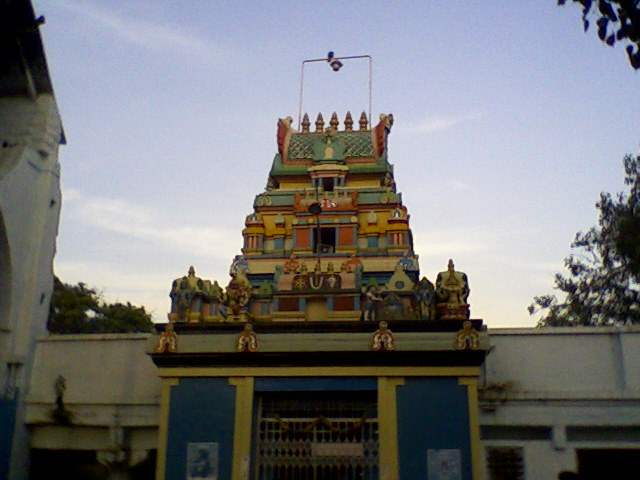
Gopuram at Chilkur Temple

Chilkur Balaji Temple is an ancient Hindu temple of Lord Balaji on the banks of Osman Sagar in Rangareddy District in Telangana. It is one of the oldest temples in the Hyderabad Dist earlier now in Rangareddy Dist, built during the time of Madanna and Akkanna, the uncles of Bhakta Ramadas.

C.S. Rangarajan is the current head priest of the Chilkur Balaji Devasthanam. The temple has no hundi and does not accept any money from devotees. The temple also has no green channel or privileges for VIPs. The only other such Hindu temples are the Jalaram temple in Virpur (Rajkot), Gujarat and "Ramanuj Kot", a temple in Jodhpur, Rajasthan. This temple fought and won the right to stay out of government control.

== Circumambulations ==
During a visit the devotee goes through the usual rituals of prayer, including 11 circumambulations of the inner shrine, and makes a vow. Once the wish is fulfilled devotees then walk 108 times around the sanctum sanctorum. The majority of wishes by devotees are visa related, thus Chilkur Balaji is also referred to as 'Visa' Balaji.

== Transportation ==
Buses to Chilkur Balaji Temple are available from Mehidipatnam Bus Stand. Bus number 288D operates with a frequency of every 10–15 minutes.
