= Moinabad mandal =

- Mandal
- Country: India
- State: Telangana
- District: Ranga Reddy district
- Headquarters: Moinabad

Area
  - Total: 198.14 km^{2} (76.50 sq mi)

Population (2011)
  - Total: 56,205
  - Density: 283.66/km^{2} (734.68/sq mi)

Languages
  - Official: Telugu
- Time zone: UTC+5:30 (IST)

Moinabad mandal is one of the 27 mandals in Ranga Reddy district of the Indian state of Telangana. It is under the administration of Chevella revenue division and has its headquarters at Moinabad.

== Demographics ==
As of 2011 census, the mandal had a population of 56,205. The total population constitute, 118,616 males and 121,415 females —a sex ratio of 1024 females per 1000 males. 21,333 children are in the age group of 0–6 years, of which 10,939 are boys and 10,394 are girls. The average literacy rate stands at 79.89% with 174,711 literates. Chilkur, Ranga Reddy has the largest area of 2,709 km^{2} (1,046 mi^{2}) and Bangaliguda has the least area of 43 km^{2} (17 mi^{2}) all the villages in the mandal. In terms of population, Chilkur is the most populated and Bangaliguda is the least populated settlement in the mandal.

== Government ==
=== Administration ===
The mandal is headed by a tahsildar. As of 2011 census, the mandal has thirty two villages.

The settlements in the mandal are listed below:

1. Amdapur
2. Ameerguda
3. Aziznagar
4. Bakaram Jagir
5. Bangaliguda
6. Chakaliguda
7. Chandanagar
8. Chilkur
9. Chinna Mangalaram
10. Chinnashapur
11. Deval Vekatapur
12. Himayatnagar
13. Kanakamamidi
14. Kanchamonigudem
15. Kasimbouli
16. Kethireddipalle
17. Medipalle
18. Moinabad
19. Mothukupalle
20. Murthuzaguda
21. Nagireddiguda
22. Nakkalapalle
23. Nazeebnagar
24. Peddamangalaram
25. Reddipalle
26. Sajjanpalle
27. Sriramnagar
28. Surangal
29. Tolkatta
30. Venkatapur
31. Yelkaguda
32. Yethbarpalle

== See also ==
- List of mandals in Telangana
