= Durgam Cheruvu Bridge =

Extradosed bridge in Hyderabad, Telangana, India

Durgam Cheruvu Cable Bridge
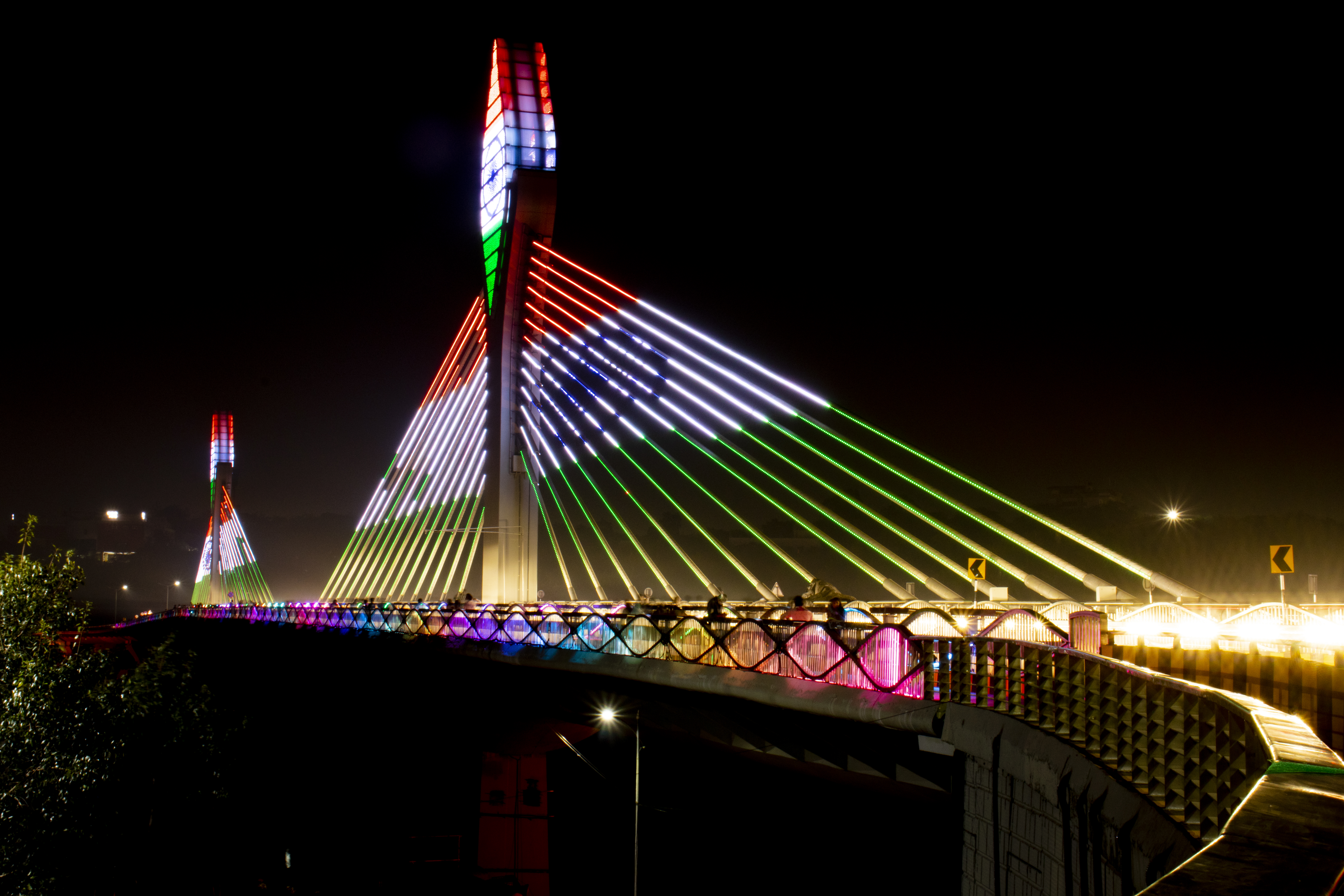
- Long exposure shot of the bridge
- Coordinates: 17°25′54″N 78°23′24″E
- Carries: 6 lanes (3 lanes each way), pedestrians and bicycles
- Crosses: Durgam Cheruvu

Characteristics
- Design: Cable-stayed bridge
- Total length: 764 metres (2,507 ft)
- Height: 50 metres (160 ft)

History
- Construction cost: ₹184 crore
- Opened: 25 September 2020; 5 years ago

Location
- Interactive map of Durgam Cheruvu Cable Bridge

The Durgam Cheruvu Cable Bridge is an extradosed bridge in Hyderabad, Telangana, India. The bridge is located near Inorbit Mall at Madhapur. The bridge connects Jubilee Hills with HITEC City and eases traffic congestion to Madhapur across Durgam Cheruvu. The bridge is supported by two 50-meter-tall towers, each with 13 pairs of steel cables connecting the tower to the bridge deck.

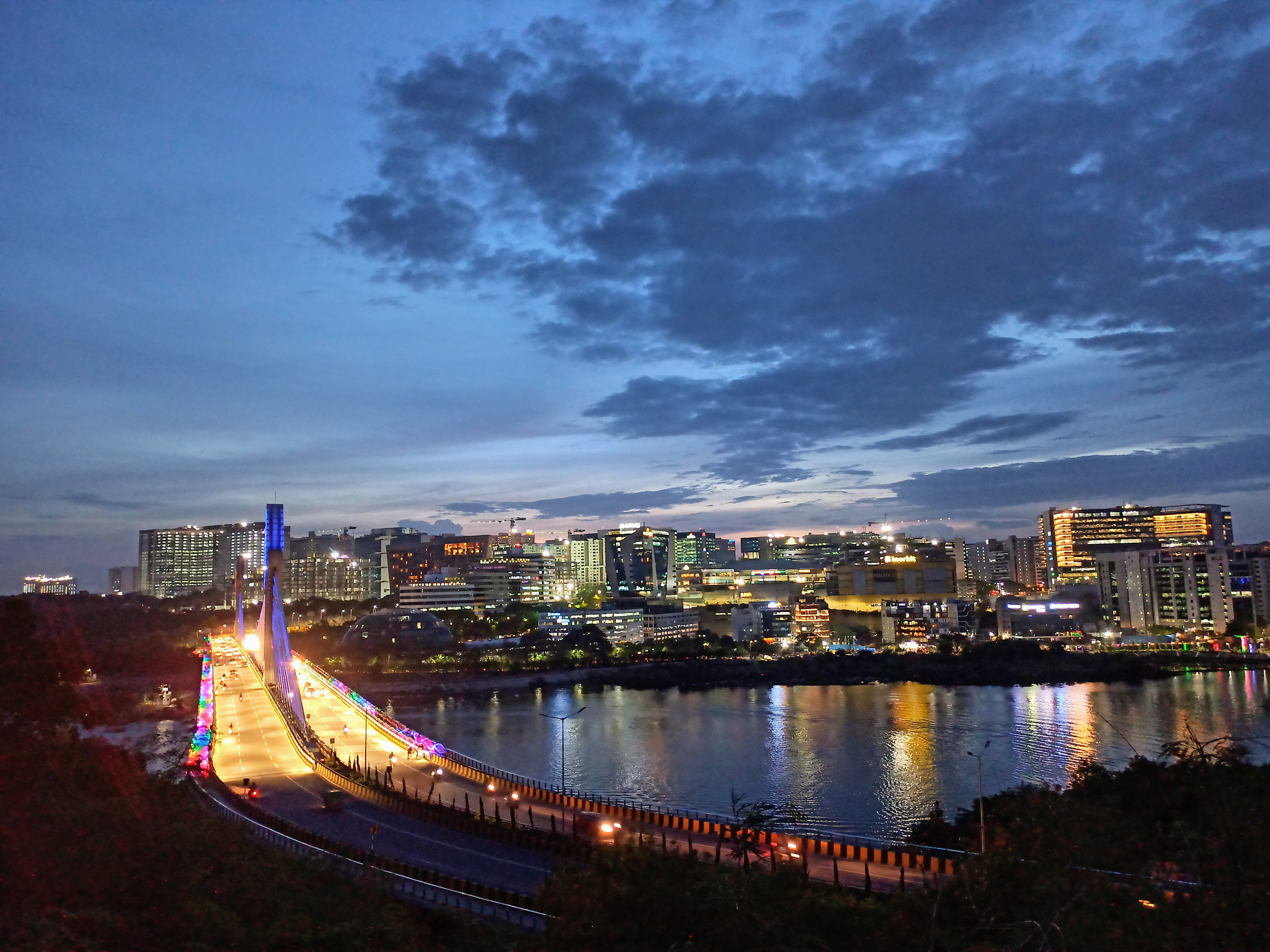
Sunset behind the Durgam Cheruvu Bridge, as seen from Dr. B.R. Ambedkar Open University

== Background ==
The city experienced a boom in traffic due to the increasing number of cars owned, and the Jubilee Hills to Madhapur commute, which historically took 30 minutes, began to take 40–60 minutes. The Government of Telangana then put forward a proposal of a bridge through Durgam Cheruvu to ease traffic in the area and cut down travel time to 10 minutes.

== Structure ==
The bridge is situated adjacent to Inorbit Mall, carrying six lanes of vehicular traffic along with 1.8 m‑wide pedestrian footpaths on both sides. Its main span measures 233.85 m, claimed to be the world’s longest precast segmental concrete span for an extradosed bridge, with a total cable‑stayed portion of 426 m including approach spans. Two 50 m‑tall pylons, each anchored by 13 pairs of high‑tensile steel stay‑cables, support the deck. The overall width is 25.8 m, accommodating six traffic lanes and footpaths. The bridge costs around ₹184 crore for the bridge structure, combined cost with the adjacent four‑lane elevated corridor is ₹334 crore. It was constructed with 26,600 m³ of concrete, 4,800 MT of structural steel, 420 MT of high‑tensile strands and 287 MT of stay‑cables. Approach ramps are of 309.8 m total length, with ramps connecting to Road No. 45 and the flyover to Mindspace Junction.

== Construction ==
According to the original plan, the bridge was supposed to have 3-5 pillars holding the road but due to some environmental concerns, the government was forced to settle for a cable-suspension bridge with 2 pillars holding the cables. Construction tenders were opened in early 2019 and L&T (Larson and Toubro) ended up winning the contract and the construction began on 9 March 2019.

The bridge was supposed to be completed in April/May 2020 and opening in June 2020. However, due to the COVID-19 Global Pandemic, construction finished in August with opening set to be done by Telangana Minister K. T. Rama Rao and Minister of State for Home Affairs, Government of India G. Kishan Reddy on 25 September.

The bridge is the longest cable-stayed bridge in Hyderabad.

== Notable events ==
Due to its distinctive design, prominent location, and scenic surroundings, the Durgam Cheruvu Bridge is frequently used as a venue for various events and public performances.

=== Inorbit Durgam Cheruvu Run (IDCR) ===
The Inorbit Durgam Cheruvu Run (IDCR) is an annual run conducted in Hyderabad since 2021. It was first held on 24 January 2021, with a 10K run starting from Inorbit Mall at the foot of the Durgam Cheruvu Bridge and covered a distance of 10km towards Jubilee Hills and KBR Park. The 2023 edition of the run expanded to include 5K, 10K, and 21K races.

=== Formula E Gen2 Car Unveiling ===
On 11 February 2023, Hyderabad hosted the 2023 Hyderabad ePrix which was one of the rounds of the Formula E World Championship, the highest class of competition for electrically powered single-seater racing cars. Prior to the start of the 2022–23 Formula E season, the new Gen2 Formula E car was unveiled at the Durgam Cheruvu Bridge on 25 September 2022.

== As a Tourist Place ==
Since its opening Durgam cheruvu bridge has been a major tourist attraction. Many Telugu film scenes were shot in this location.visitors can also enjoy the Floating Restaurant, which is another attractive spot at the cable bridge. The musical fountains at the Durgam Cheruvu cable bridge are also opened.

== See also ==
- Karimnagar Cable Bridge
