= Parugu (soundtrack) =

Soundtrack album by Mani Sharma
- Released: 29 March 2008
- Recorded: 2007–2008
- Genre: Feature film soundtrack
- Length: 26:38
- Language: Telugu
- Label: Aditya Music
- Producer: Mani Sharma

Mani Sharma chronology
Kantri (2008)	Parugu (2008)	Yuvatha (2008)

Parugu is the soundtrack to the 2008 film of the same name directed by Bhaskar, produced by Dil Raju and stars Allu Arjun, Sheela Kaur and Prakash Raj. The soundtrack features six songs composed by Mani Sharma with lyrics written by Sirivennela Sitaramasastri, Anantha Sreeram and Chandrabose. The soundtrack was released under the Aditya Music label on 29 March 2008 and received positive reviews from critics.

== Background ==
Mani Sharma composed the film's soundtrack and background score in his first collaboration with both Allu Arjun and Bhaskar. Initially, Devi Sri Prasad was roped in as the film's composer after he previously worked with Bhaskar on Bommarillu (2006), before Sharma replaced him. Bhaskar described the songs were situational numbers that driven the story forward. Sirivennela Sitaramasastri penned lyrics for two songs: "Parugulu" and "Hrudayam", whereas Anantha Sreeram penned lyrics for the songs "Nammavemo Gaani", "Yelageyalaga" and "Manakanna Podiche" and Chandrabose wrote lyrics for the song "Chal Chal Chalo". The songs were performed by Hemachandra, Rahul Nambiar, Kailash Kher, Saindhavi, Ranjith and Saketh.

== Release and reception ==
The film's soundtrack was launched on 29 March 2008 at a promotional event held at Durgam Cheruvu. The cast and crew attended the function and Chiranjeevi felicitated the event as the chief guest and handed the first cassette to Prakash Raj. The soundtrack was distributed and marketed by Aditya Music. The soundtrack was a huge success with record number of sales, and the songs "Nammavemo", "Hrudayam" and "Manakanna Podiche" were chart busters. Nammavemo has similarities to the Music Director's own creation, from the 2007 Tamil song, Devadhaiye Vaa Vaa. The makers conducted another function to distribute double platinum disc shields on 17 May 2008, at Jayabheri Club in Hyderabad. Except for Bhaskar and Sharma, the rest of the crew attended the event.

"[Sharma] gave us fantastic music, more of melody in tune with the title and mood of the film. Though you will have a feel that the mass beats are missing, they will soon become memorable."

— Allu Arjun, on the music of Parugu

The soundtrack received positive reviews from critics. IndiaGlitz wrote "Manisharma strives hard to make the album a musical hit and he succeeded in it." Karthik Srinivasan of Milliblog wrote "Barring two tracks, Parugu affirms Bhaskar's vision as a director who knows his stuff and can extract good music from his composers – much like he did from Devi Sri Prasad, in his debut venture, Bommarillu."

Jeevi of Idlebrain.com wrote "Music by Mani Sharma is good. Mani Sharma gave Hollywood texture to the background music (especially the instruments used). Picturization of the songs is pretty good." Radhikha Rajamani of Rediff.com wrote "Manisharma's music is in sync with the film but perhaps not his best." A reviewer from Sify, while praising Sharma's music further indicated that "A couple of songs showing Allu Arjun in swing are good, while the remaining numbers are average."

== Other versions ==
The songs "Yelageyalaga" and "Manakanna Podiche" were reused by Sharma as "Ready Readya" and "Love Love" for the Tamil film Mappillai (2011).

== Track listing ==
Parugu (Original Motion Picture Soundtrack) track listing
No.	Title	Lyrics	Singer(s)	Length
1.	"Parugulu"	Sirivennela Seetharama Sastry	Ranjith	4:20
2.	"Nammavemo Gaani"	Ananta Sriram	Saketh Vegi	4:49
3.	"Yelageyalaga"	Ananta Sriram	Kailash Kher, Saindhavi	4:23
4.	"Chal Chal Chalo"	Chandrabose	Ranjith	4:37
5.	"Hrudayam"	Sirivennela Seetharama Sastry	Hemachandra	3:49
6.	"Manakanna Podiche"	Ananta Sriram	Rahul Nambiar, Thaman S	4:40
Total length:				26:38

== Accolades ==
Accolades for Parugu (Original Motion Picture Soundtrack)
Award	Category	Recipient(s)	Result	Ref.
Filmfare Awards	Best Male Playback Singer – Telugu	Saketh – ("Nammavemo Gaani")	Nominated	
