= Hardik Pandya =

Indian cricketer (born 1993)

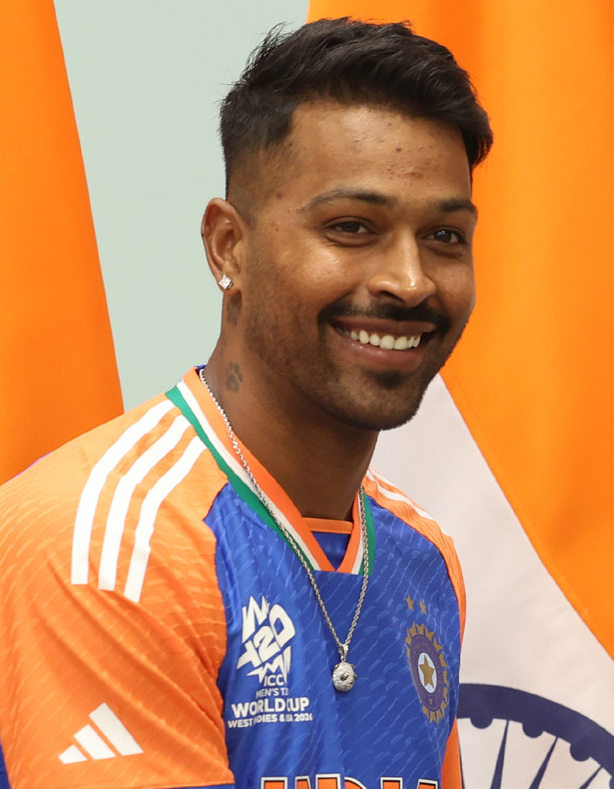
- Pandya in 2024

Personal information
- Full name: Hardik Himanshu Pandya
- Born: 11 October 1993 (age 33); Choryasi, Gujarat, India
- Nickname: Kung Fu Pandya, Hairy
- Height: 1.83 m (6 ft 0 in)
- Batting: Right-handed
- Bowling: Right-arm medium-fast
- Role: All-rounder
- Relatives: Krunal Pandya (brother)

International information
- National side: India (2016–present)
- Test debut (cap 289): 26 July 2017 v Sri Lanka
- Last Test: 30 August 2018 v England
- ODI debut (cap 215): 16 October 2016 v New Zealand
- Last ODI: 9 March 2025 v New Zealand
- ODI shirt no.: 33 (formerly 11)
- T20I debut (cap 58): 26 January 2016 v Australia
- Last T20I: 8 March 2026 v New Zealand
- T20I shirt no.: 33 (formerly 11, 228)

Domestic team information
- Years: Team
- 2012–present: Baroda
- 2015–2021, 2024–2026: Mumbai Indians
- 2022–2023: Gujarat Titans
- 2027: Punjab Kings

Career statistics
| Competition | Test | ODI | T20I | FC |
|---|---|---|---|---|
| Matches | 11 | 94 | 131 | 29 |
| Runs scored | 532 | 1,904 | 2,128 | 1,351 |
| Batting average | 31.29 | 32.82 | 29.15 | 30.02 |
| 100s/50s | 1/4 | 0/11 | 0/8 | 1/10 |
| Top score | 108 | 92* | 71* | 108 |
| Balls bowled | 937 | 3,460 | 2075 | 2,694 |
| Wickets | 17 | 91 | 107 | 48 |
| Bowling average | 31.05 | 35.50 | 26.7 | 30.95 |
| 5 wickets in innings | 1 | 0 | 0 | 3 |
| 10 wickets in match | 0 | 0 | 0 | 0 |
| Best bowling | 5/28 | 4/24 | 4/16 | 5/28 |
| Catches/stumpings | 7/– | 35/– | 60/– | 14/– |
Medal record
Men's cricket
Representing India
ICC T20 World Cup
| Winner | 2024 West Indies & USA |
| Winner | 2026 India & Sri Lanka |
ICC Champions Trophy
| Winner | 2025 Pakistan |
| Runner-up | 2017 England & Wales |
ACC Asia Cup
| Winner | 2016 Bangladesh |
| Winner | 2018 UAE |
| Winner | 2023 Pakistan |
| Winner | 2025 UAE |
- Source: ESPNcricinfo, 24 January 2026

Hardik Himanshu Pandya (born 11 October 1993) is an Indian international cricketer who plays for the Indian cricket team. He is an all-rounder who is a right-handed middle-order batsman and right arm fast-medium bowler. He is considered one of the best all-rounders in the world in white-ball cricket. Pandya is the first fast-bowling all-rounder in T20Is to complete 1,000 runs and 100 wickets. He plays for Punjab Kings in the Indian Premier League and occasionally plays for Baroda in domestic cricket. He has captained the Indian team in white-ball cricket and was the vice-captain of the team that won the 2024 T20 World Cup.

== Early years ==
Pandya was born on 11 October 1993 in Choryasi, Surat, Gujarat. His father, Himanshu Pandya, ran a small car finance business in Surat which he shut down and moved to Vadodara when Hardik was five to provide his sons with better cricket training facilities. Himanshu Pandya worked as a loan consultant in Vadodara. He enrolled his two sons into Kiran More's cricket academy in Vadodara. Lacking finances, the Pandya family lived in a rented apartment in Gorwa, with the brothers using a second-hand car to travel to the cricket ground. Hardik studied at the MK High School until ninth grade before dropping out to focus on cricket.

Pandya made steady progress in junior-level cricket, and according to Krunal, "won a lot of matches single-handedly" in club cricket. In an interview with the Indian Express, Hardik said that he was dropped from his state age-group teams due to his "attitude problems". He added that he was "just an expressive child" who did not "like to hide his emotions."

According to his father, Pandya was a leg spinner until the age of 18 and turned to fast bowling at the insistence of the Baroda coach Sanath Kumar.

== Domestic career ==
Pandya has been playing for Baroda in domestic cricket since 2013. He played a vital role in helping the Baroda win the Syed Mushtaq Ali Trophy in the 2013–14 season. In January 2016, he slammed eight sixes during his innings of 86 not out to guide Baroda to a six-wicket victory over Vidarbha in the Syed Mushtaq Ali Trophy. However, in the years that followed, his participation in domestic cricket has been scarce.

=== Indian Premier League ===
Pandya played for Mumbai Indians in the Indian Premier League from 2015 to 2021. With them, he won four Indian Premier League titles in 2015, 2017, 2019, and 2020.

Ahead of the mega auction in 2022, Pandya was released by Mumbai Indians. He was then drafted by the new Ahmedabad-based franchise, Gujarat Titans, and named captain of the team. He led Gujarat Titans to their maiden IPL title that year, becoming the first captain after Shane Warne in 2008 to lead a team to the title in its debut season. In 2023, Pandya again led Gujarat Titans to their second consecutive final, but lost to Chennai Super Kings by five wickets through DLS method.

In November 2023, Pandya was traded back to Mumbai Indians after two seasons with Gujarat Titans in an all-cash trade deal, which involved Cameron Green being traded from Mumbai Indians to Royal Challengers Bengaluru. Pandya was later named captain of the team, replacing Rohit Sharma, a decision that drew criticism from the home crowd, who booed Pandya during the seasons that followed under his captaincy. Under Pandya, Mumbai Indians ran an unsuccessful campaign in 2024, failing to qualify for the playoffs and finishing last in the league stage with 4 wins in 14 games. In 2025, Pandya was able to take the Mumbai Indians to the playoffs with 8 wins in 14 games, but lost in Qualifier 2 to Punjab Kings. In 2026, however, Mumbai Indians failed to qualify for the playoffs, finishing in ninth place in the league with 4 wins in 14 games. This drew extreme criticism to Pandya's captaincy yet again.

On 7 November 2026, it was reported that Mumbai Indians was set to trade Pandya to Punjab Kings in exchange for Arshdeep Singh. This was following his desire to be released from the team following the 2026 season. On 11 November, the trade was completed and formally announced by the IPL.

== International career ==
=== T20Is ===
Pandya made his Twenty20 International (T20I) debut for India on 27 January 2016 at the age of 22, picking up 2 wickets against Australia. His first Twenty20 International wicket was Chris Lynn. In the second T20I against Sri Lanka at Ranchi, he batted ahead of Yuvraj Singh and MS Dhoni and hit 27 off 14 balls before becoming hat-trick victim of Thisara Perera. In 2016 Asia Cup, Pandya smashed an 18-ball 31 helping India post a respectable score against Bangladesh. Later on, he also picked up a wicket to secure the win. In the next match against Pakistan he bowled his best figures of 3 for 8 which restricted Pakistan to 83. In a 2016 World Twenty20 match against Bangladesh on 23 March, Pandya took two crucial wickets in the last three balls of match's final over as India beat Bangladesh by one run.

Pandya's career best bowling figures of 4 for 38 was achieved in the 3rd and final Twenty20 International against England on 8 July 2018, when he also scored 33 not out in 14 balls and hit the winning runs with a six off Chris Jordan. He became first Indian to take 4 wickets and score over 30 runs in the same T20I match.

In September 2021, Pandya was named in India's squad for the 2021 ICC Men's T20 World Cup after being declared fit to bowl his full quota of overs. Pandya scored 11 against Pakistan and 23 against New Zealand in defeats, as India crashed out of the World Cup despite big wins over Afghanistan, Scotland and Namibia. Pandya's bowling fitness came under scrutiny as he bowled only 4 overs across the tournament. He was dropped from the squad for the subsequent T20I series against New Zealand.

In June 2022, Pandya was named India's captain for their T20I matches against Ireland.

On 7 July 2022, Pandya scored 51 runs off 33 balls, his maiden T20I half-century against England at Southampton. He also took 4/33, making him the first Indian player to record a half-century and take 4 wickets in the same T20I.

==== 2024 T20 World Cup ====
In April 2024, Pandya was named the vice-captain of the Indian squad for the 2024 ICC Men's T20 World Cup. During India's successful T20 World Cup campaign, Pandya took 11 wickets and scored 144 runs at a strike rate of 150. In the final, he took 3 wickets, including those of Heinrich Klaasen and David Miller, and also bowled the last over of the match. At the conclusion of the tournament, Pandya became the first Indian all-rounder to be ranked number 1 in the T20I Rankings.

=== ODI career ===
Pandya made his One Day International (ODI) debut for India against New Zealand on 16 October 2016 at Dharamshala. He became the fourth Indian to be named player of the match on ODI debut after Sandeep Patil, Mohit Sharma and K. L. Rahul. In his first ODI innings as a batsman, he scored 36 runs from 32 balls. In the group stages of ICC Champions Trophy, Pandya hit three consecutive sixes off Imad Wasim in the same over before rain stopped play. On 18 June 2017, in the final of the Champions Trophy at the Oval, he struck a 43-ball 76 in a losing cause, after coming in with India at 54/5 following a top order collapse.

He was selected in the ODI XI of the year 2017 by ESPNcricinfo.

In April 2019, he was named in India's squad for the 2019 Cricket World Cup. On 27 June 2019, in the match against the West Indies, Pandya played in his 50th ODI.

On 17 July 2022, Pandya bowled his ODI career-best 4–24 against England in Old Trafford. His 71 runs scored during the 2nd innings of the same match made him the first Indian player to score a half-century and take 4 wickets in an ODI since Yuvraj Singh in 2011.

=== Test career ===
Pandya was included in India's Test squad for their home series against England in late 2016, but was eventually left out after he injured himself while training in the nets at the PCA Stadium. He was named in the squad that toured Sri Lanka in July 2017 and played his first Test on 26 July in Galle. In the 3rd and the final Test match against Sri Lanka at Pallekele, Pandya scored his maiden Test century, and set the record for becoming the first Indian batsman to score a Test century just before lunch. He also set the record for scoring the most runs in a single over of a Test innings for India, scoring 26 runs, which was later surpassed by Jasprit Bumrah. This century was his first century in international cricket.

== Personal life ==
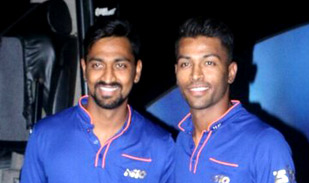
Pandya (right) with brother Krunal during Mumbai Indians' victory celebration after 2017 Indian Premier League

Pandya's brother Krunal has also played for India and the Mumbai Indians. Their father, Himanshu Pandya died in January 2021 of cardiac arrest.

Pandya got engaged to dancer and actress Nataša Stanković on 1 January 2020; on 30 July 2020 their first child, a boy, Agastya Pandya was born. On 14 February 2023, the couple renewed their wedding vows in a ceremony in Udaipur, Rajasthan. In 2024, the couple's relationship came under scrutiny during Pandya's maiden season as captain of the Mumbai Indians, as Stanković took down her posts in which they were together and dropped his last name out of her username on Instagram. The couple mutually separated in July 2024.

== Controversies ==
In January 2019, Pandya appeared with teammate K. L. Rahul on the show Koffee with Karan, and made several controversial comments which were met with immediate public backlash. During the interview, Pandya spoke about how he had proudly informed his parents of his first sexual encounter, which was well received by them. He also proclaimed that he likes to "observe how women move" at high-end bars and nightclubs, as well as on social media and then went on to liken himself to a black person saying, "I'm a little from the black side so I need to see how they move". The public categorized his monologue as indecent, derogatory, misogynistic and disgraceful. Pandya apologized for his remarks by saying that he had gotten carried away by the nature of the show. The Board of Control for Cricket in India (BCCI) responded to the controversy by saying, "It will be considered whether players should even be allowed to appear on such TV shows which have got nothing to do with cricket." The BCCI found the comments as very crass, sexist and cringeworthy, and was not impressed by the apology, seeking appropriate legal action into the matter as it was a breach of conduct. Both Pandya and Rahul were handed a suspension until a pending investigation and were called back from the then ongoing tours of Australia and New Zealand. Furthermore, on 13 January 2019, Gillette suspended their brand association with Pandya for its Mach3 razor. On 24 January 2019, after lifting the suspension on Pandya and Rahul, the BCCI announced that Pandya would re-join the squad for the matches in New Zealand.

== Honours ==
Mumbai Indians

- Indian Premier League: 2015, 2017, 2019, 2020

Gujrat Titans

- Indian Premier League: 2022; runner-up: 2023

India

- T20 World Cup: 2024, 2026
- Champions Trophy: 2025; runner-up: 2017
- Asia Cup: 2016, 2018, 2023, 2025

Individual

- ICC Men's T20I Team of the Year: 2022, 2024
