= State Gallery of Art, Chitramayee =

Public gallery in Hyderabad, India

State Gallery of Art
- Location of the gallery in India
- Established: 2004
- Location: Road Number 1, Kavuri Hills, Madhapur, Hyderabad, Telangana, India
- Coordinates: 17°26′12″N 78°23′52″E
- Type: Art gallery; fine arts
- Owner: Government of Telangana

The State Gallery of Art, also known as Chitramayee and as the State Gallery of Fine Arts, is a public fine arts gallery located in Madhapur, Hyderabad, in the state of Telangana, India. It was established in 2004. It operates under the Youth Advancement, Tourism & Culture Department of the Government of Telangana.

== History ==
Established in 2004 by the Department of Culture, Government of Andhra Pradesh, the gallery was created to promote fine arts and support artists across disciplines in the region. Following the formation of Telangana in 2014, the gallery came under the administration of the Government of Telangana and operates under the Youth Advancement, Tourism & Culture Department of the Government of Telangana.

== Art exhibitions ==
The gallery hosts national and international art exhibitions throughout the year, featuring works by both emerging and established artists. Regular programming includes solo shows, thematic group exhibitions, photography festivals, and workshops aimed at art education and public engagement.

The gallery has a strong focus on community engagement. It provides space and opportunities for local artists and regularly collaborates with educational institutions and independent curators. For instance, in 2025, the "Arts Education: Responding to Changing Landscapes" conference was held at the gallery, bringing together educators and artists to discuss arts education in Southern India.

== Location and accessibility ==
The State Gallery of Art is located at Road Number 1, Kavuri Hills, Madhapur in Hyderabad. It can be accessed through private or public transport.
