= Shilparamam =

Coordinates: 17.451°N 78.377°E

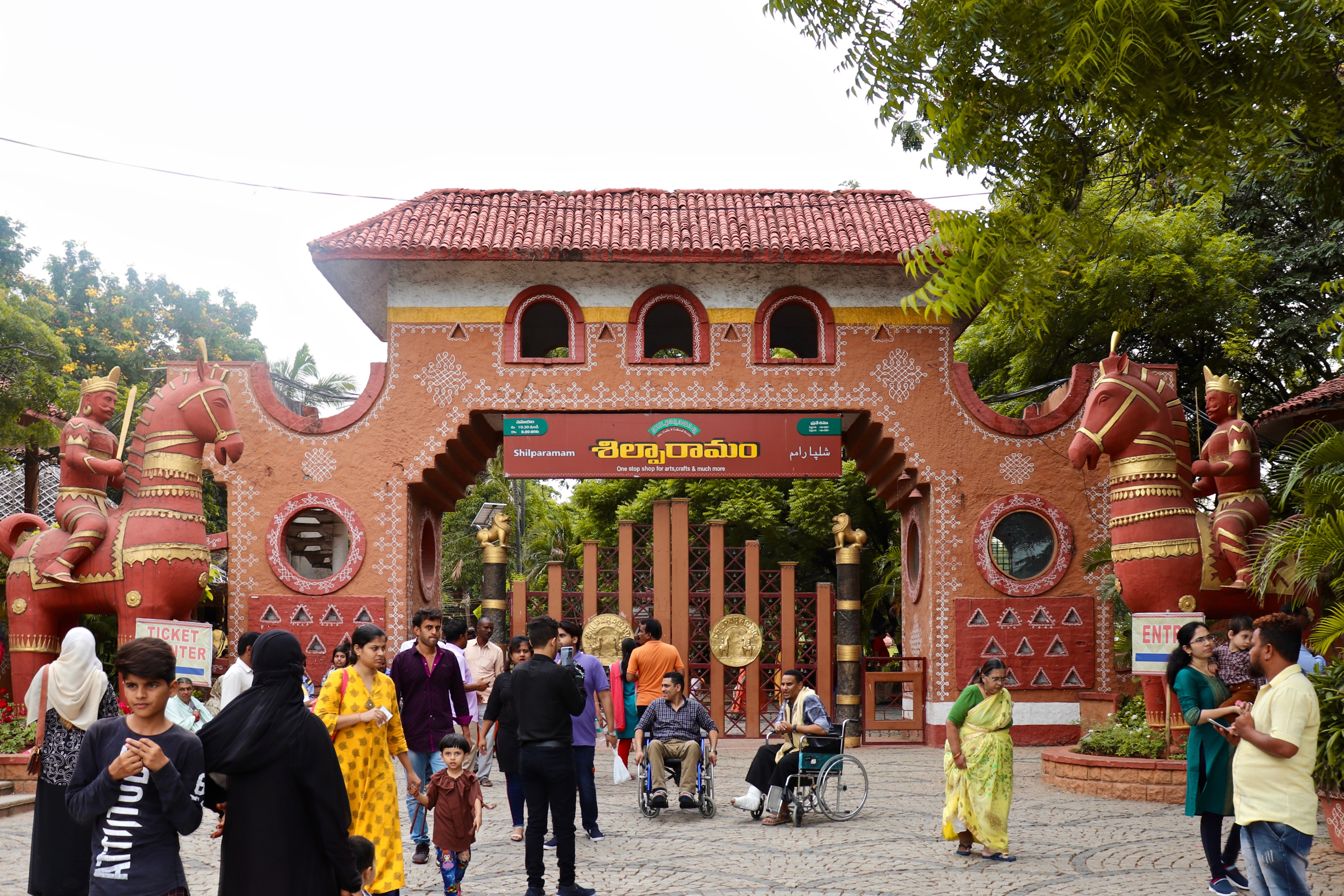

General information
- Type: Crafts village
- Architectural style: Ethnic
- Location: Madhapur, Hyderabad, Telangana, India
- Completed: 1998
- Opened: 21 June 1998

Website
- shilparamam.in

Shilparamam is an arts and crafts village located in Madhapur, Hyderabad, Telangana, India.

The village was conceived with an idea to create an environment for the preservation of traditional Indian crafts. There are ethnic festivals round the year.

Established in 1992, Shilparamam is situated a few kilometers from Hyderabad city. It is composed of 65 acres (260,000 m^{2}) of land.

== Attractions at Shilparamam ==
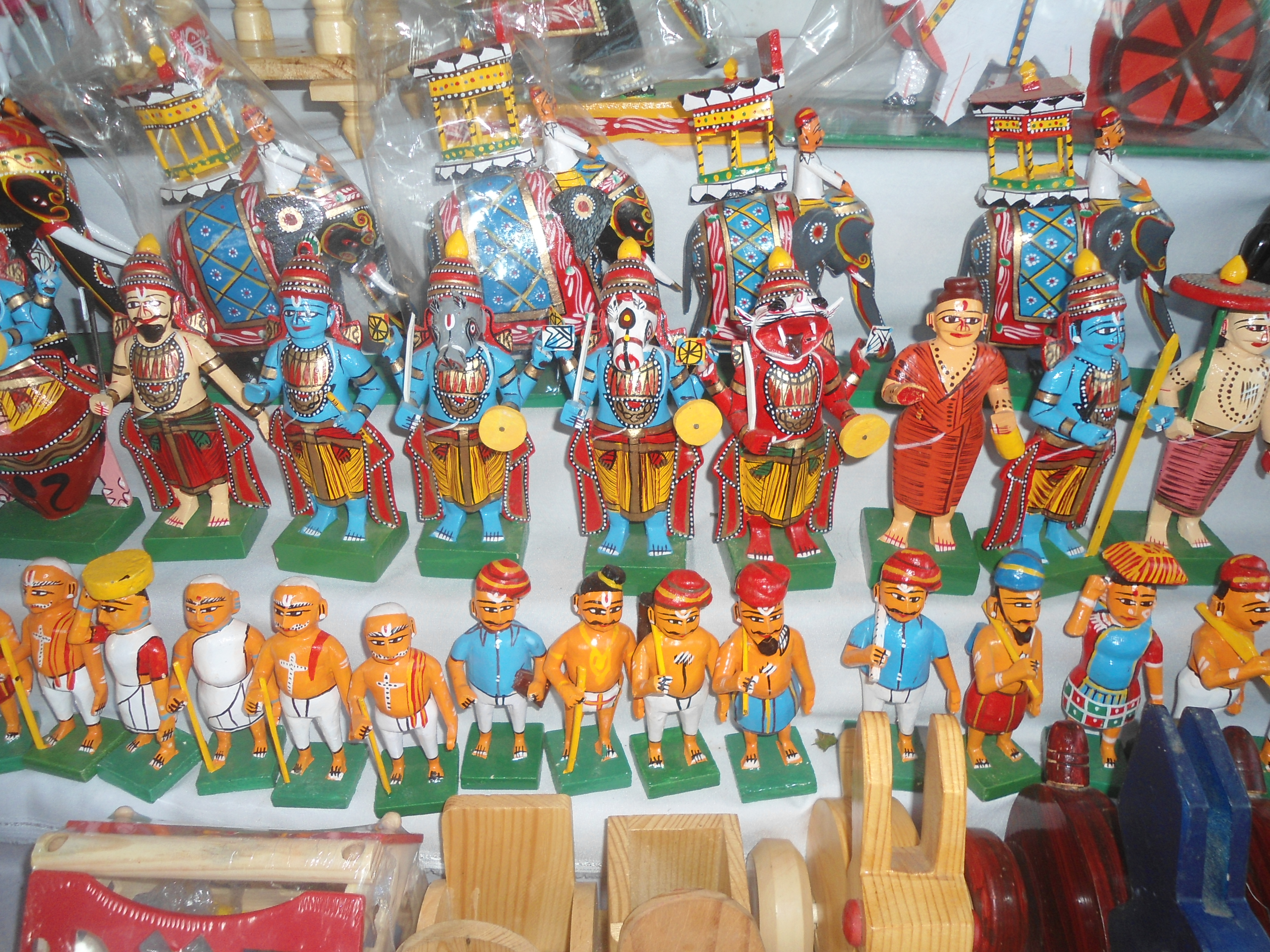
Wood craft models on display at Shilparamam in Hyderabad

=== Rural Museum ===
The rural museum, surrounded by trees, is a miniature depiction of a typical Indian village. Over 15 life-sized huts, authentically constructed out of baked clay and thatch, depict rural and tribal lifestyles and the life of various artisans. It provides a window to rural life for city dwellers and those who have never visited a rural village. The museum houses sculptures and life size models depicting the day-to-day activities of the rural artisans.

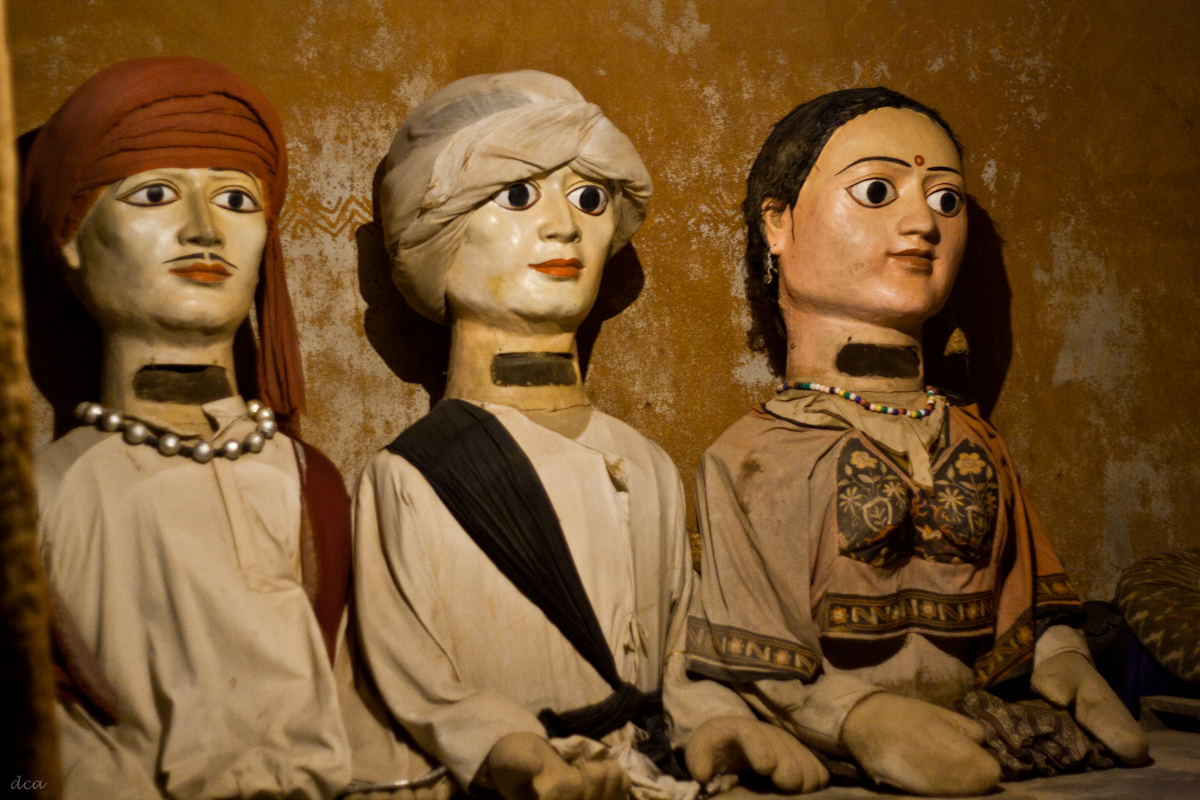
Clay models at the Rural Museum

=== Rock Museum ===
Shantiniketan's Subrata Basu has fashioned a rock garden here by blending his own rock collections with the rock formations found in the village.

== Photo gallery ==
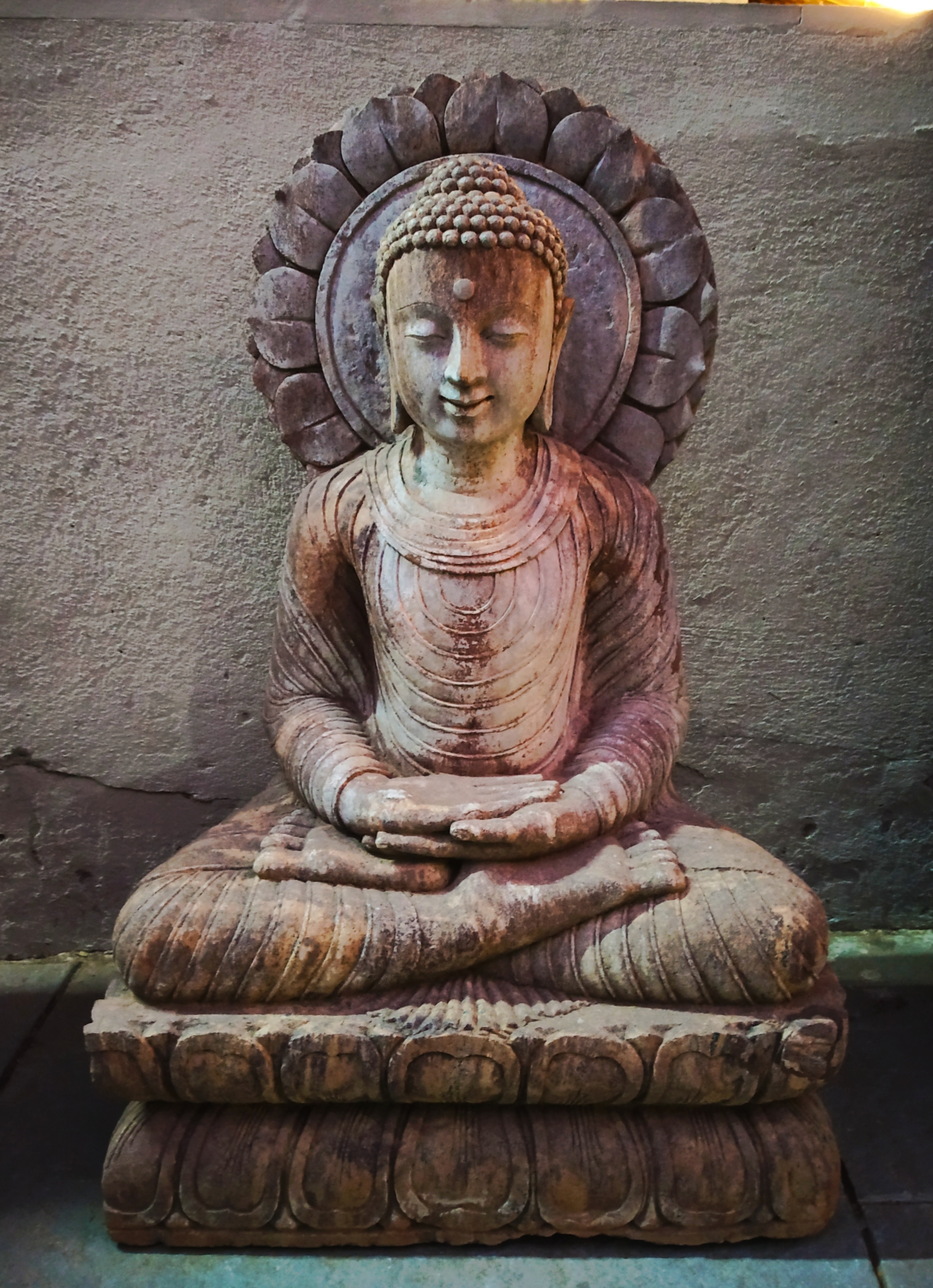
Buddha statue carved out of stone.

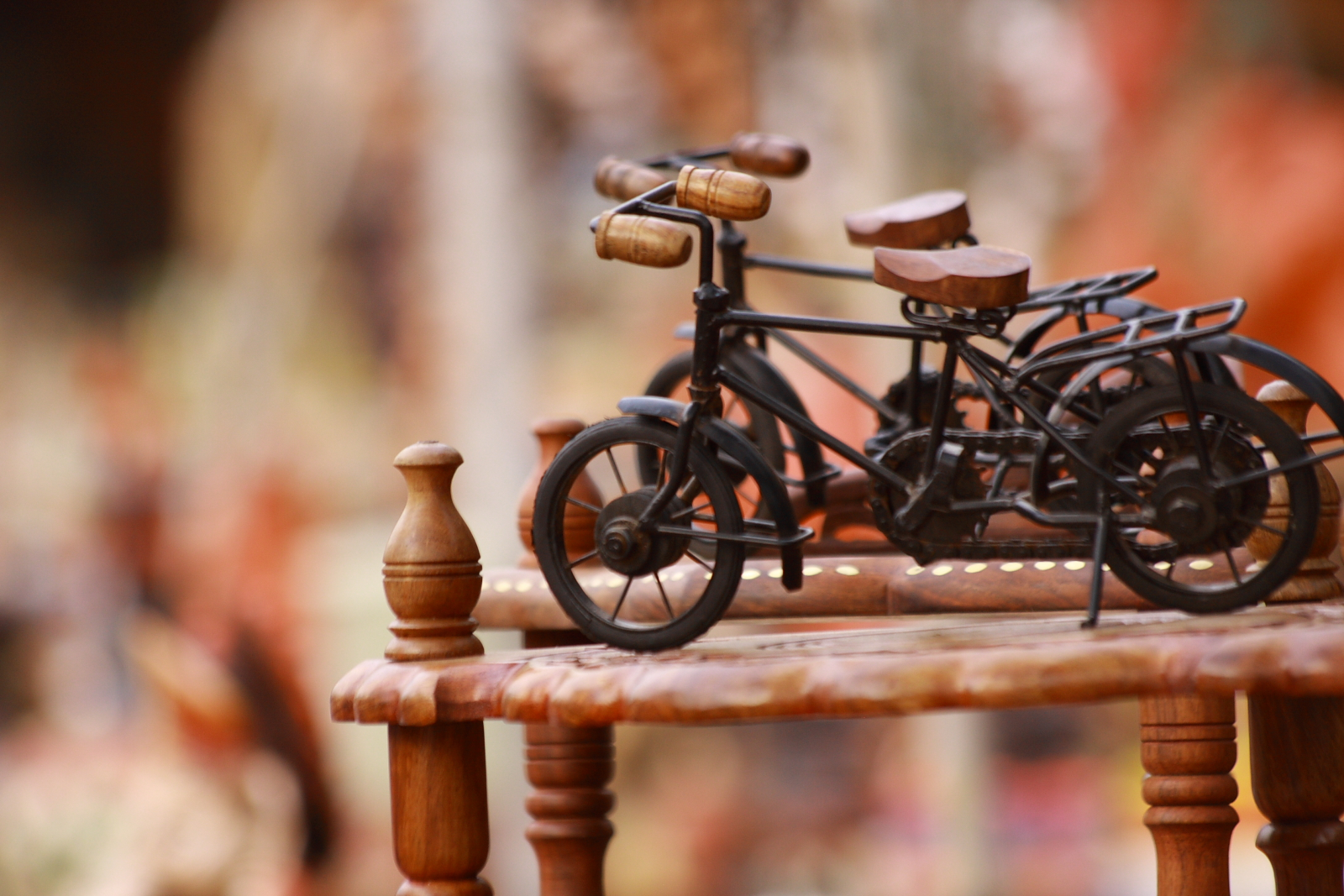
A miniature model of bikes displayed at Shilparamam

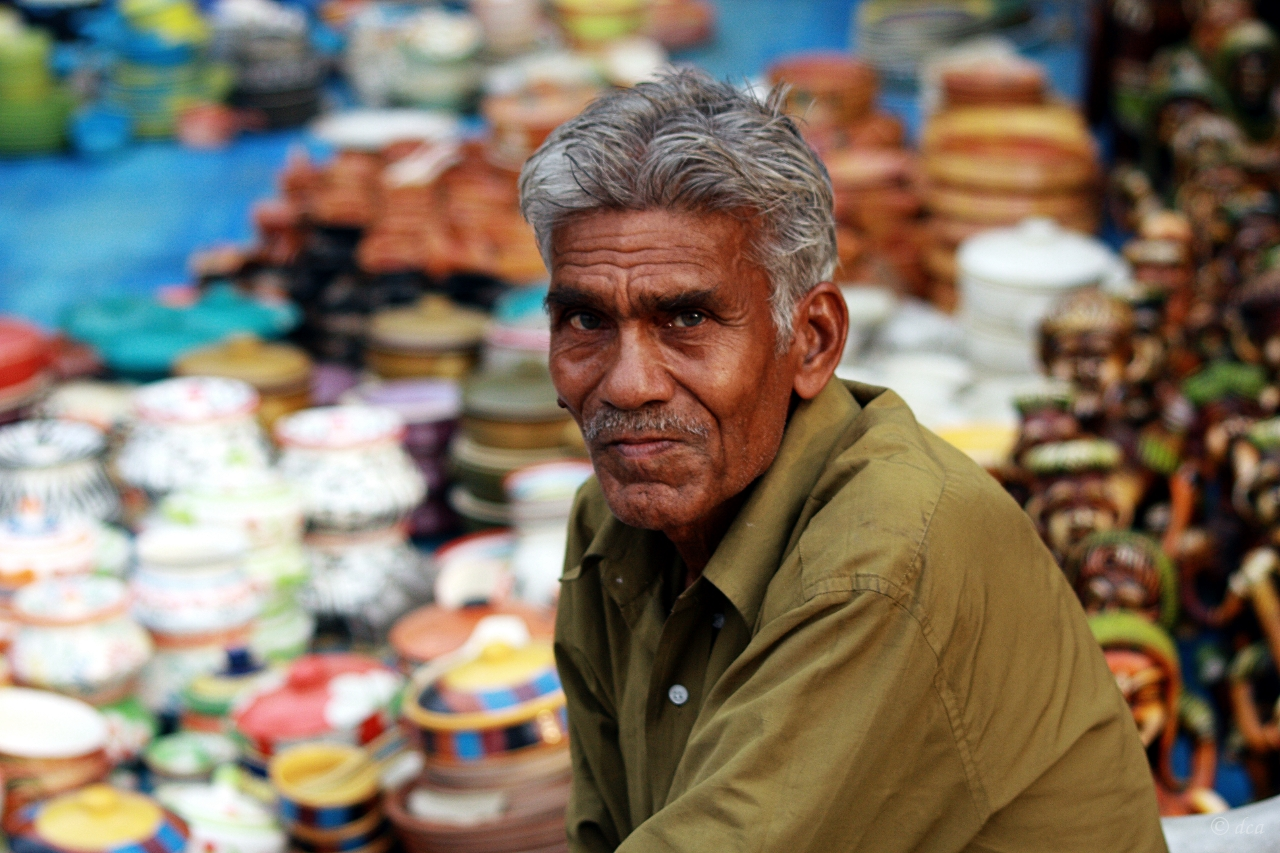
A handicrafts seller at Shilparamam

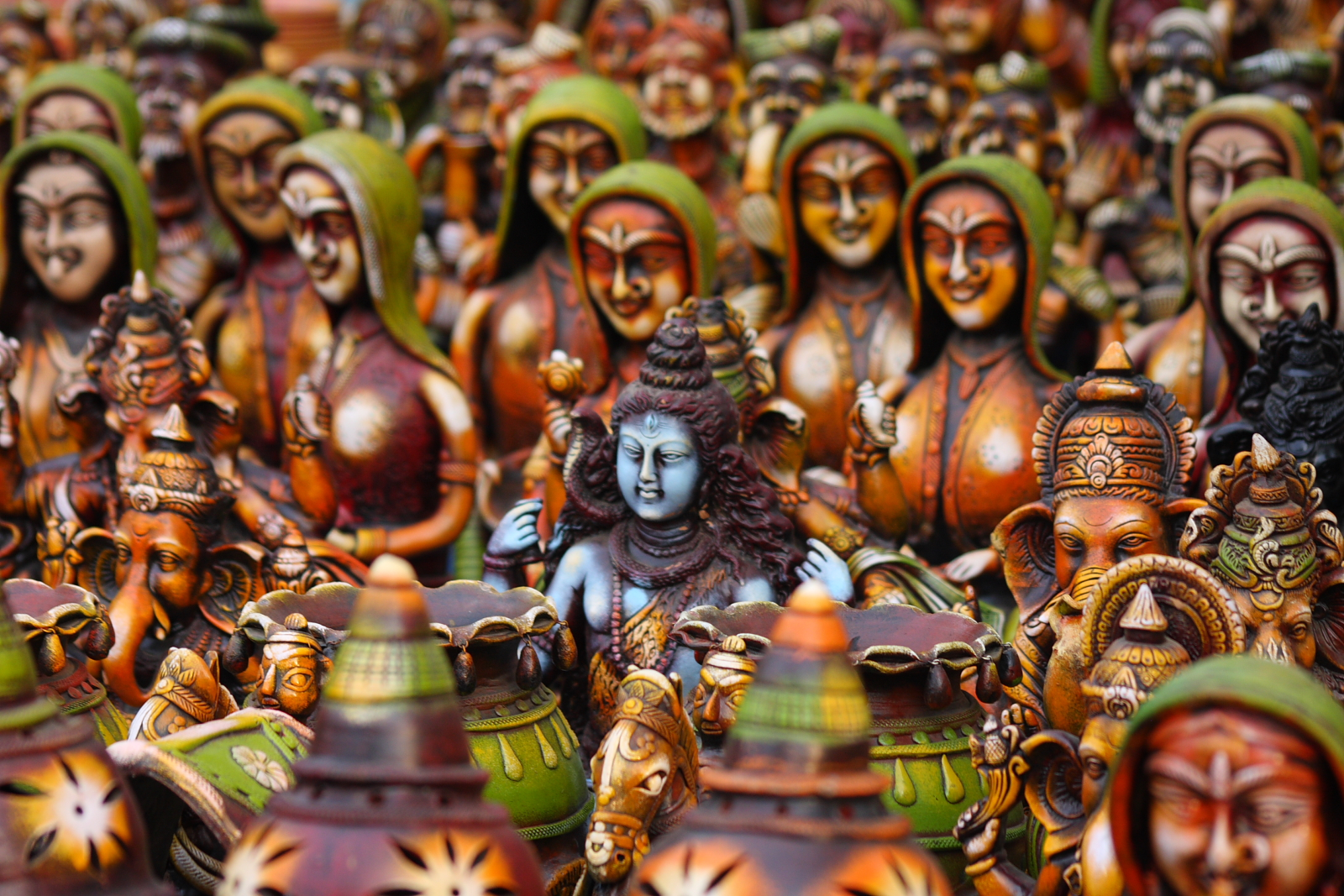
Handicraft models of Deities displayed at Shilparamam

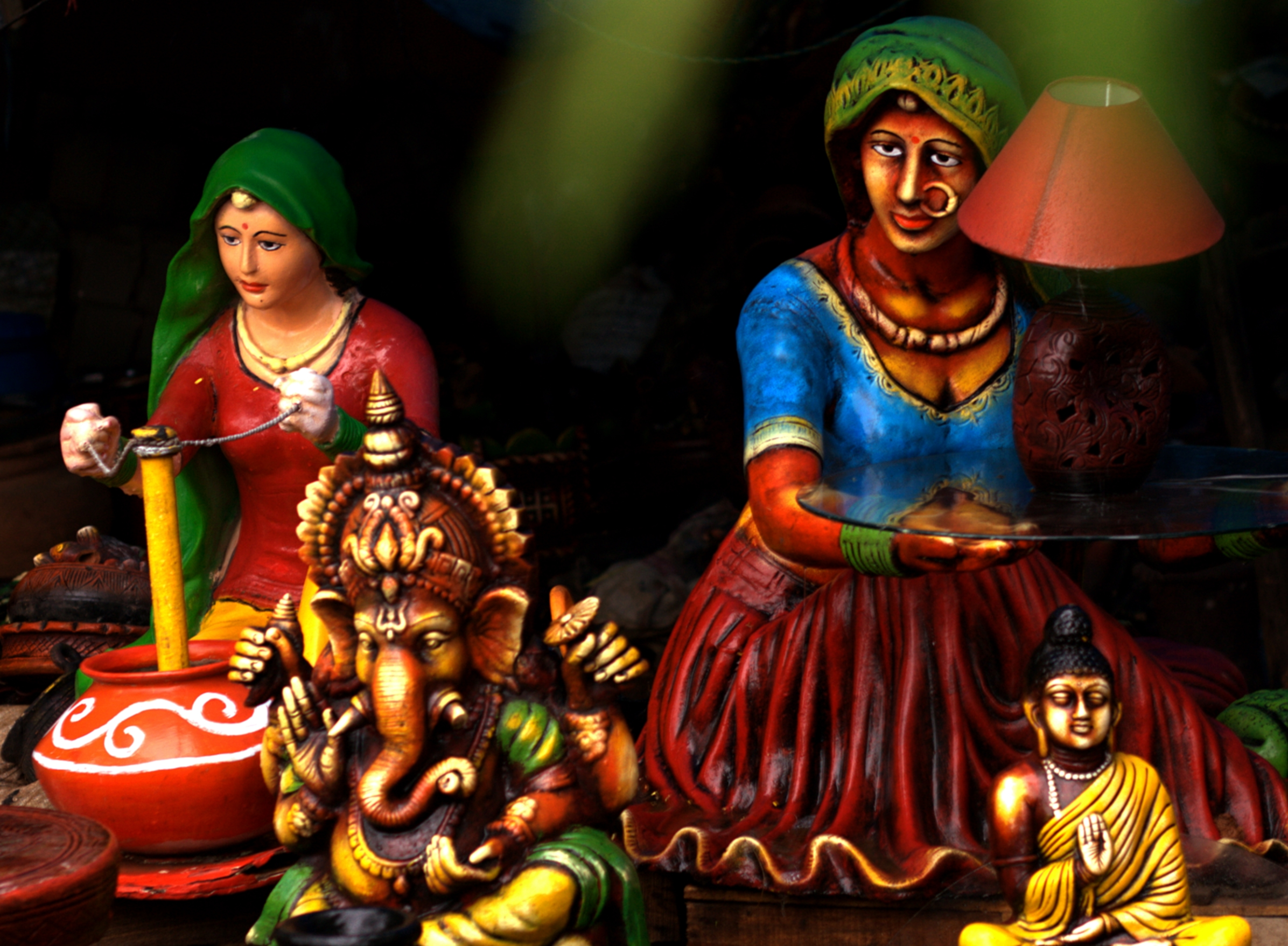
Colored clay models for sale in Shilaparamam

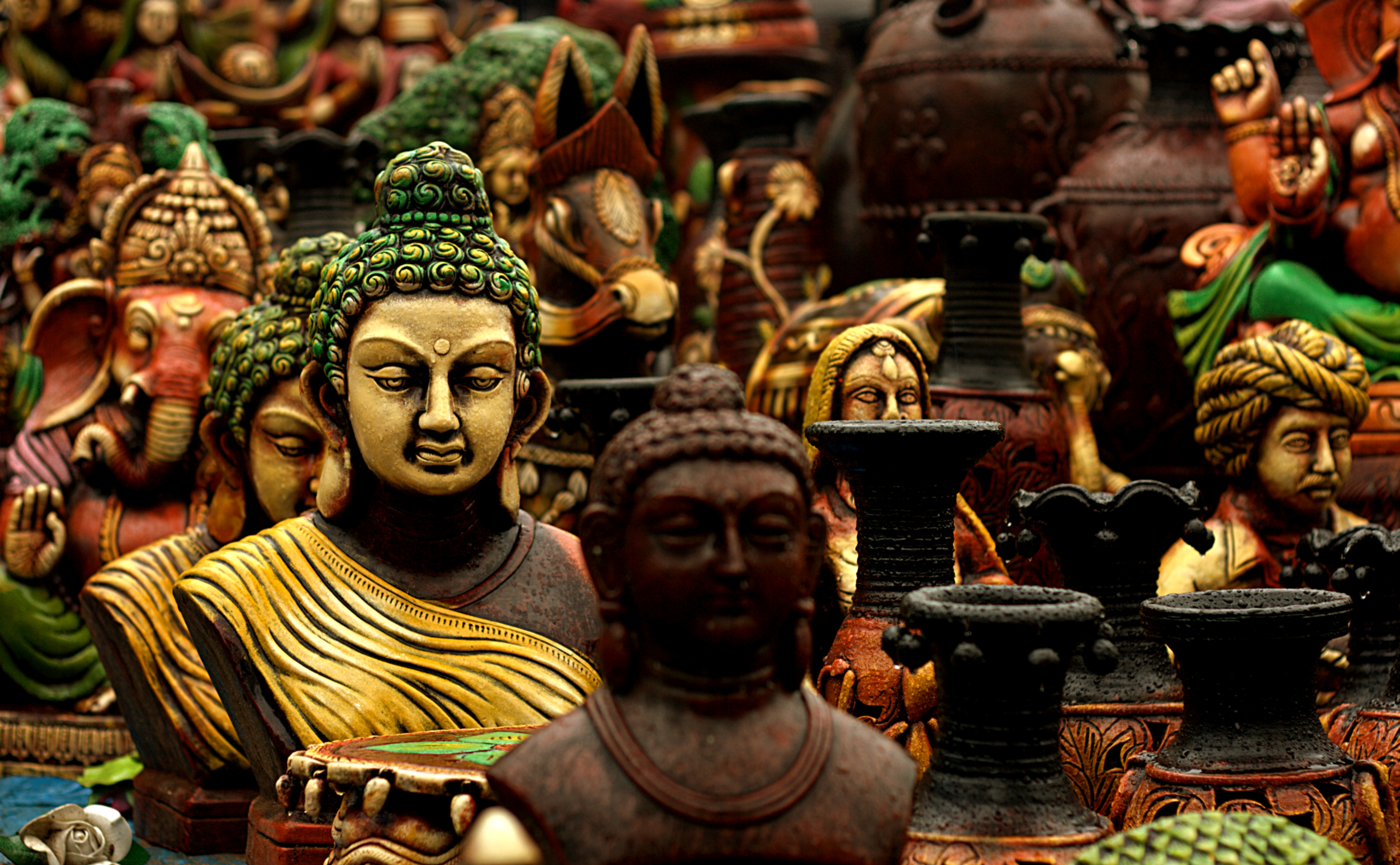
Clay model of the Buddha on display at Shilparamam

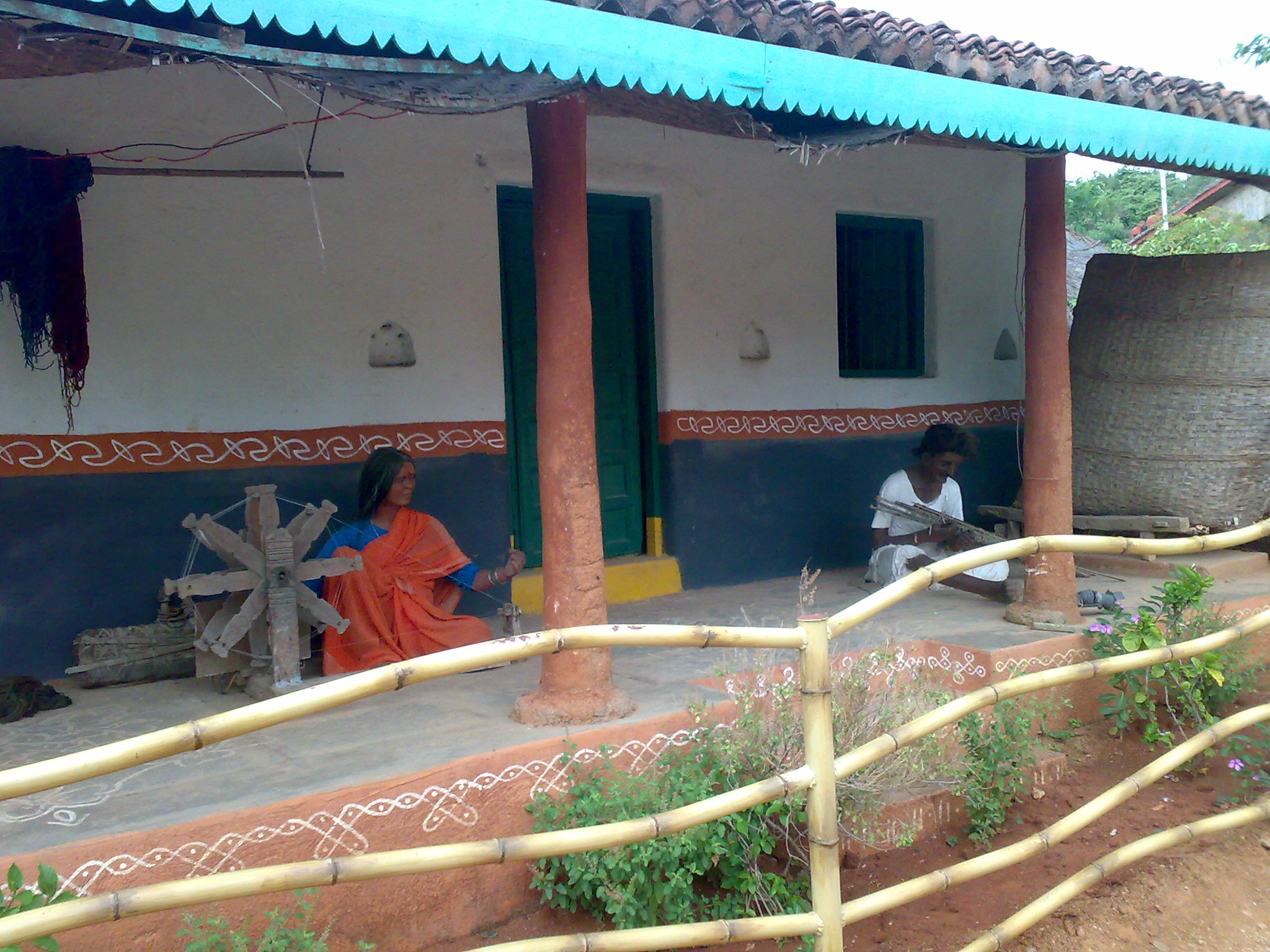
Shilparamam weavers Clay Models

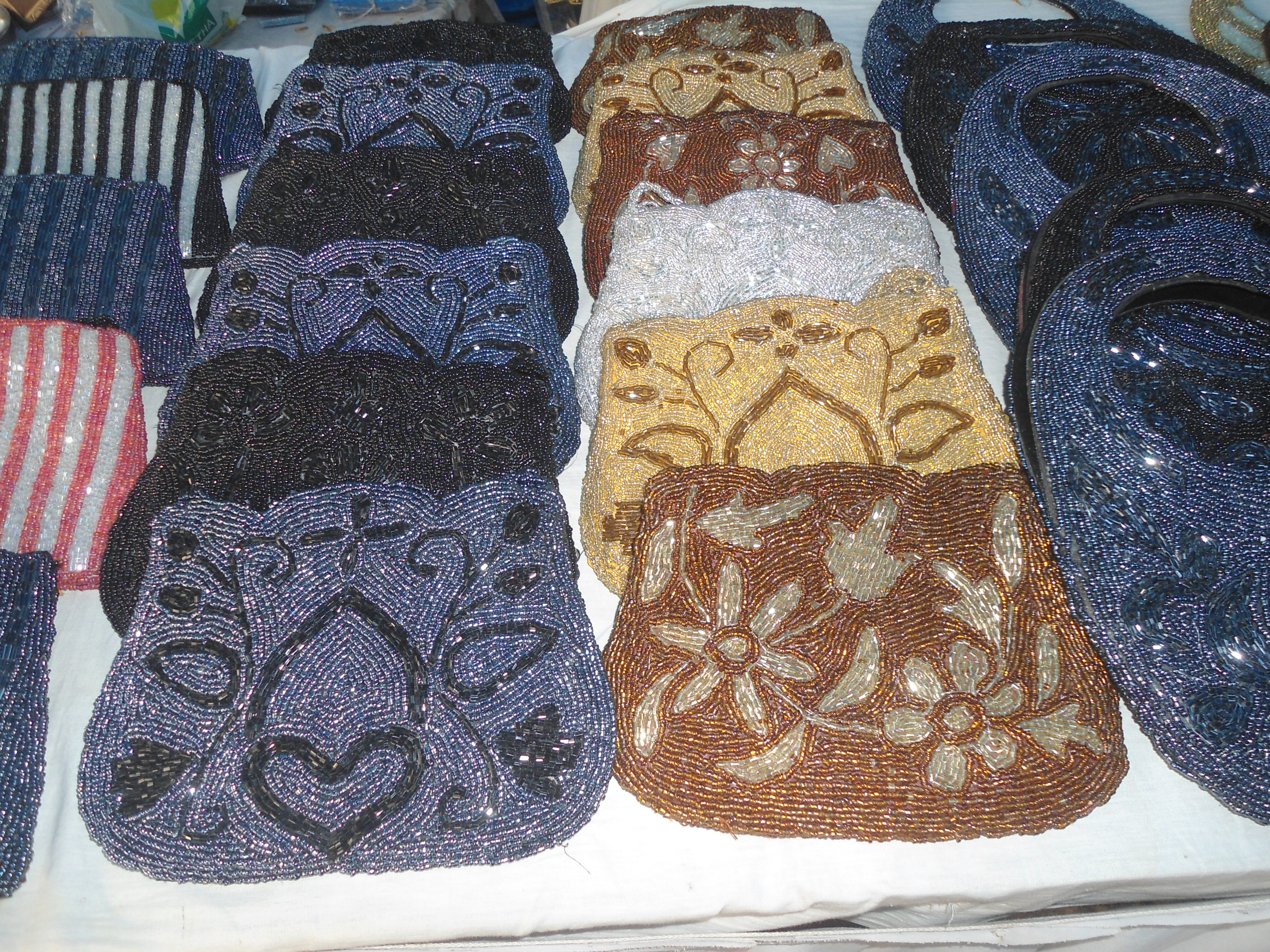
Handbags at Shilparamam

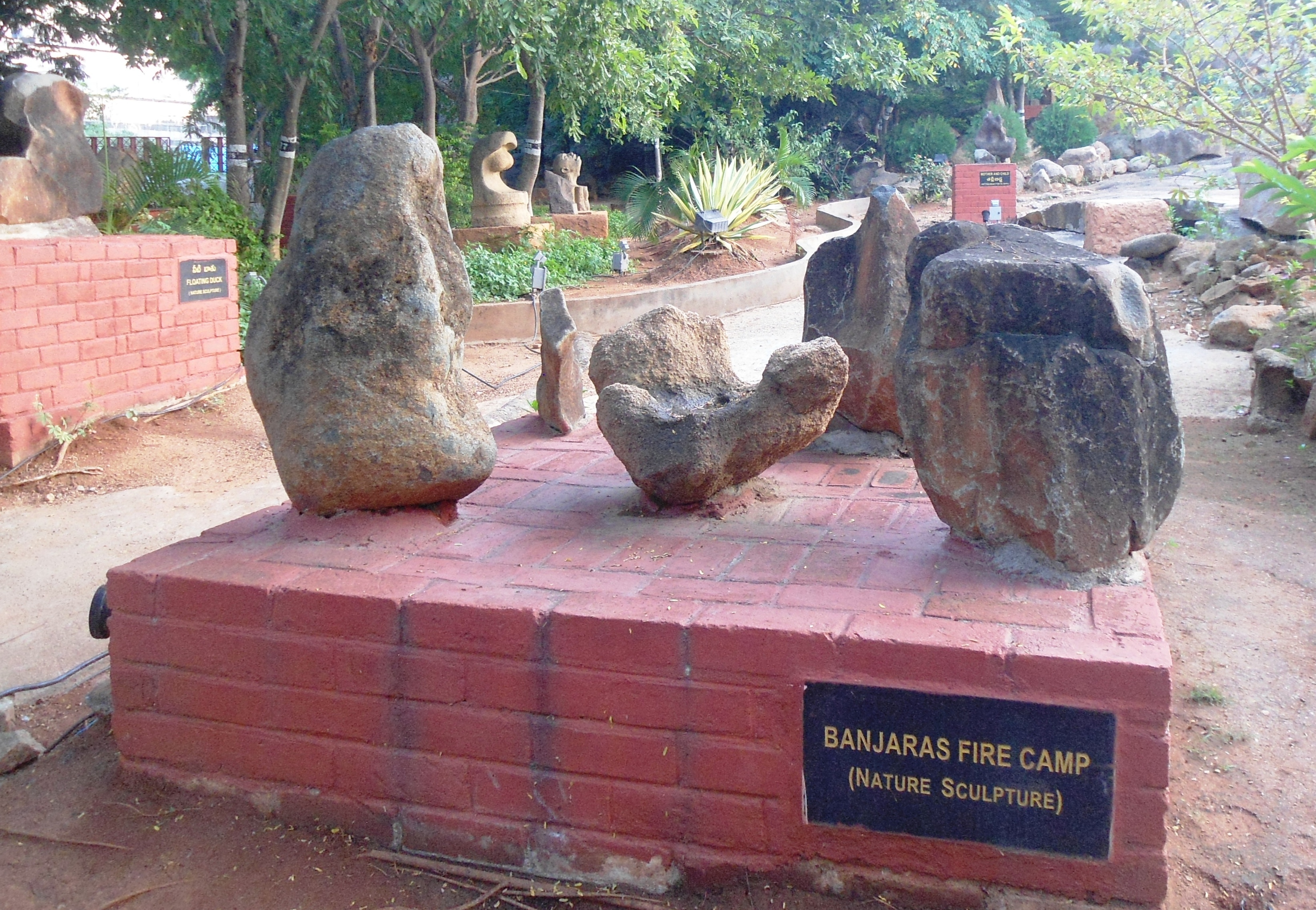
Rock park at Shilparamam
