= Inorbit Mall =

- Inorbit Mall Logo
- Location: Malad, Mumbai; Vashi, Navi Mumbai; Cyberabad, Hyderabad; Vadodara; Hubballi; Visakhapatnam; Chhatrapati Sambhajinagar; Coimbatore
- Opened: 2004
- Developer: K Raheja Corporation
- Owner: K Raheja Corporation
- Num. of stores: 6
- Num. of anchor tenants: 2 in each property
- Parking: Available
- Website: www.inorbit.in

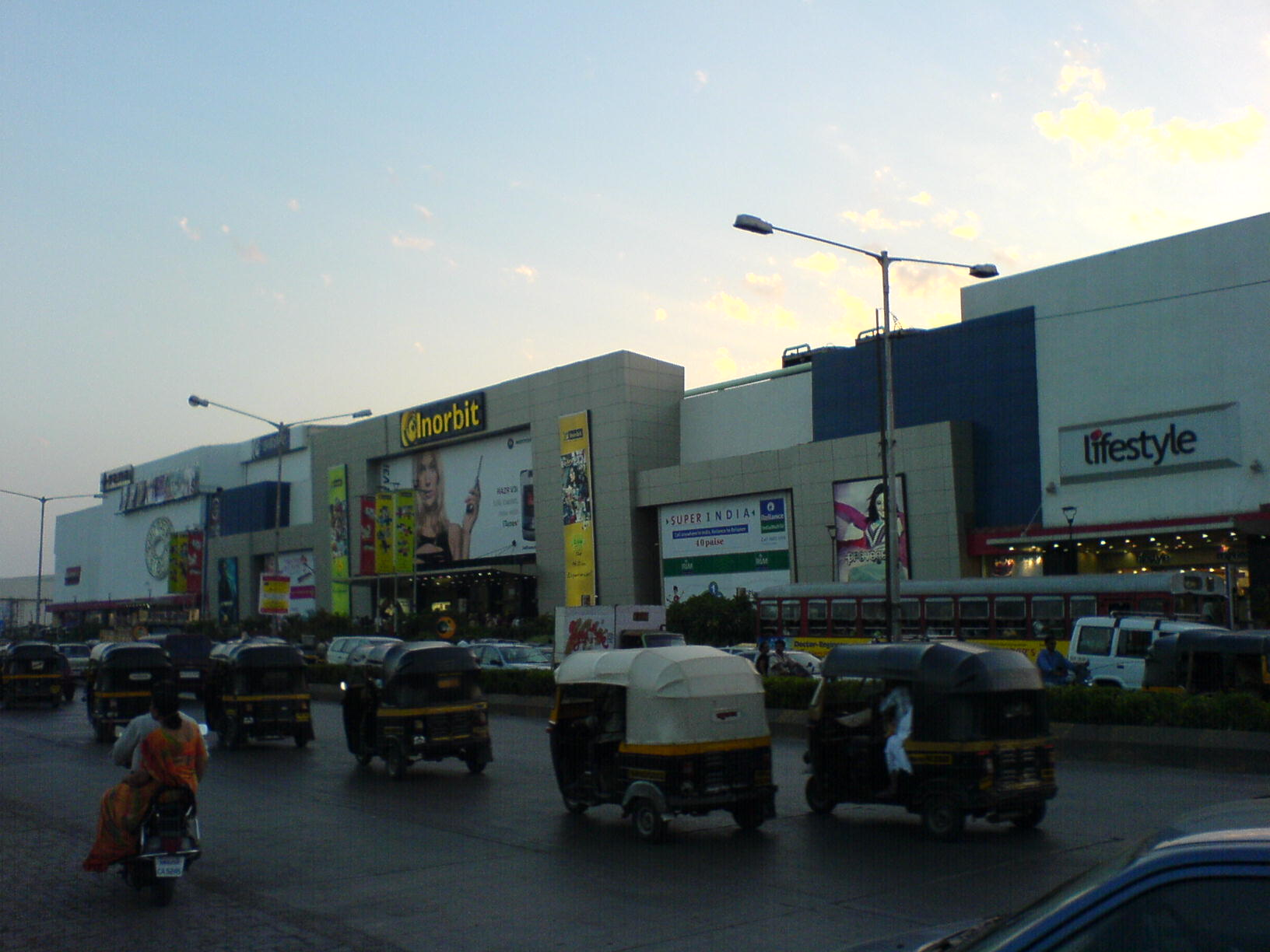
Inorbit Mall, Malad

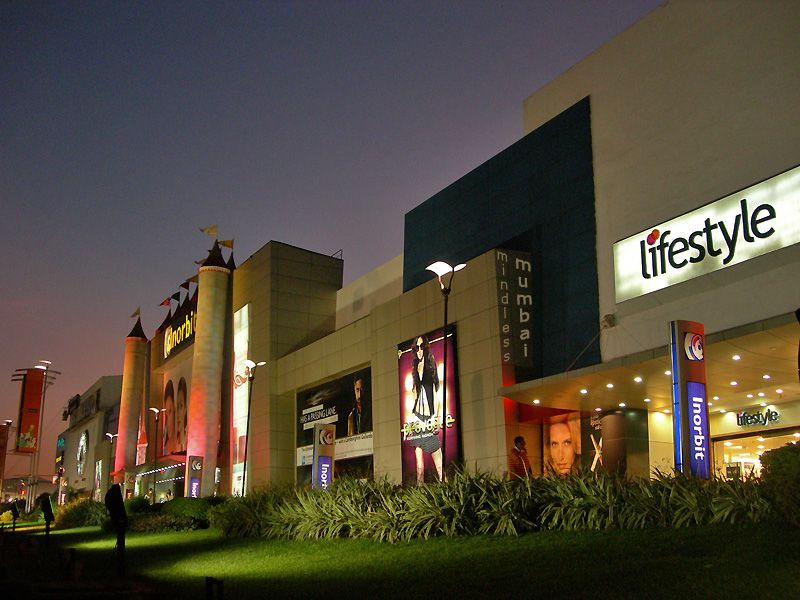
Inorbit Mall, Malad Night View

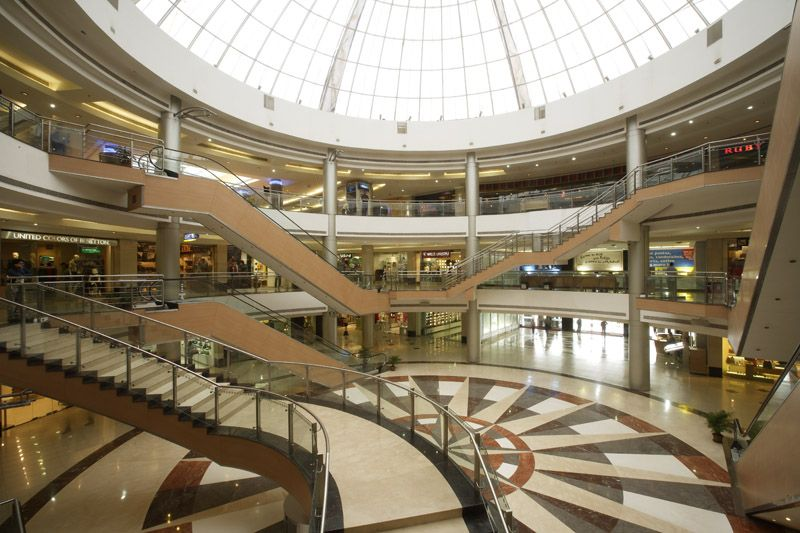
Inorbit Mall, Malad Inside View

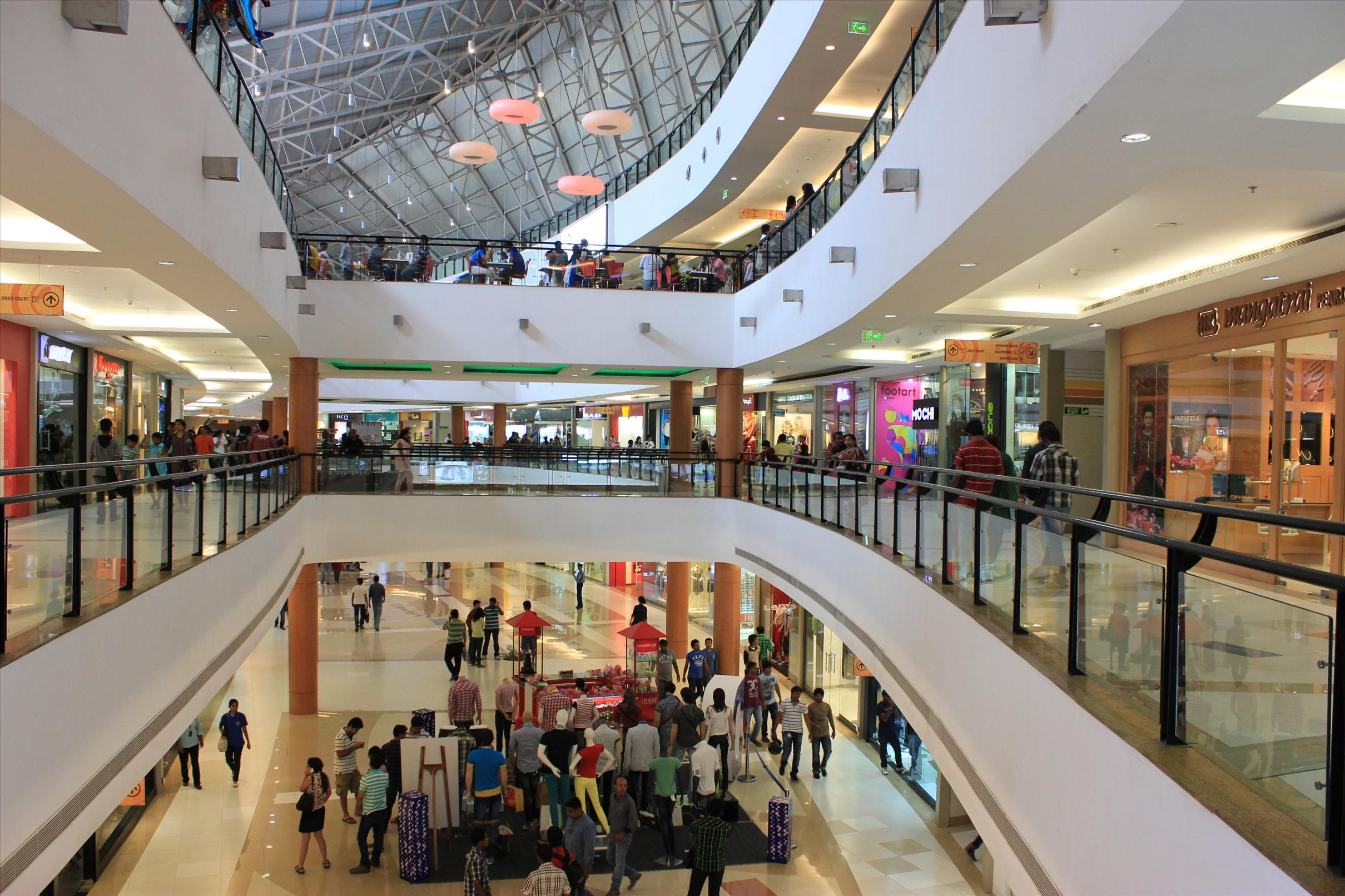
Interior of Inorbit Mall, Hyderabad

Inorbit Mall is a subsidiary of K. Raheja Corporation which runs shopping malls in various parts of India. The first Inorbit Mall opened in 2004, in Malad, Mumbai. This is the fourth oldest shopping mall in Mumbai, from Infiniti Mall of Andheri, R Mall of Mulund, and Crossroads of South Mumbai. Inorbit Malls launched their second property in Vashi, Navi Mumbai, in October 2008; third in Cyberabad, Hyderabad in October 2009; fourth in Vadgaon Sheri, Pune in May 2011 which was closed down in November 2016; fifth in Whitefield, Bangalore on 15 September 2012 which was closed down in 2021; sixth in Vadodara on 5 September 2013; seventh in Hubli on 25 August 2025, and eighth in Visakhapatnam on 27 March 2026.

In 2026, Inorbit Malls acquired Prozone Group malls in Chhatrapati Sambhajinagar (Aurangabad) and Coimbatore.

The company follows a lease-plus-revenue mode revenue model for all its properties.

== Inorbit Malad ==
Inorbit Mall, Malad was the first shopping mall to open under the Inorbit umbrella. The mall was launched in 2004 in Malad, Mumbai. It is also the fourth oldest shopping mall in Mumbai. The mall has a gross leasable area of 500,000 sq ft (46,000 m^{2}). It was designed by architectural firm P.G. Patki and Associates and is counted among the better planned malls in the city. At the time, it claimed to be the biggest mall property in South East Asia, housing Mumbai's largest food court. In 2008, the mall was retrofitted for energy efficiency by Johnson Controls Inc under the Clinton Climate Initiative (CCI). The property was part of a civil suit, filed in 2008 by industrialist Nusli Wadia, owner of the land which was leased to K Raheja Corporation claiming damages for violation of the said lease. Wadia requested the court to direct the mall be demolished. In 2012, the Bombay High Court recommended that both parties appoint a third party valuer for the property and that the valuation be conducted every six months to calculate the 12% of the realisation figure that Wadia is entitled.

The mall houses 26 restaurants and the foodcourt is spread over 12,000 sq. ft and seats 800 people at a time. The restaurants at Inorbit Malad are sought after and waiting times are as long as three hours for a table. After the Inorbit Malad experience, the company has doubled the number of restaurants in subsequently developed mall spaces. Due to the number of footfalls, the mall hosts a variety of promotional events. In 2007, Panasonic displayed the world's largest plasma screen at Malad. Inorbit Malad frequently hosts Music releases of top bollywood movies. Movies which have had their music launched at the mall include The Dirty Picture and Don. Other bollywood events held at Inorbit Malad include pre-film promotional events attended by filmstars, like one attended by Asin to promote Ready and fashion brand Provogue as well as a launch by socialite Paris Hilton in 2011. Other events that have taken place at Inorbit Malad include an international boxing bout held by World Series of Boxing (WSB) in 2011. It is the first mall in the world to have held such an event. During large sports events such as the Indian Premier League, Inorbit installs large screens in food courts to retain clientele. The mall is said to generate revenues of between 800 million and 840 million per annum and attracts 40,000 visitors each weekend.

In 2010, Inorbit Malad launched "Mall Walk", a scheme where people could use the mall property for their morning walks at no cost. The development of Inorbit Mall has led to street hawkers setting up shop on the opposite side of the road, which was earlier a hawker-free zone. These hawkers synchronise their timings with that of the mall, with mall employees and customers being their clientele. The mall often plays host to cooking classes, self-defence workshops and free music concerts. Post 2017–present, one of the recently added popular stores of the mall is the H&M store which provides fashion wear for kids and adults.

== Inorbit Vashi ==
Inorbit Vashi was inaugurated in 2008. The mall is located in Vashi, Navi Mumbai. It has a gross leasable area of 550,000 sq ft (51,000 m^{2}). The mall is credited with changing the face of the area, as until then there were no big brands having a presence in Vashi. Residents of neighbouring areas have voiced their wishes for an Inorbit Vashi type of mall to be built in their area as well. The mall is known as a "one stop destination" for shoppers in Navi Mumbai as well as for offering wifi facility at no cost to shoppers. The mall frequently hosts music events called "Live @ Inorbit" and has hosted bands such as The Yagna, Split, Live saver, Chain reaction and Inertia. In 2010, the mall ran an initiative called Aikya where it displayed a sand sculpture of a rhinoceros to promote wildlife conservation. The mall offers many restaurants, salons and spas, and clothing brand stores.

== Inorbit Pune ==
Inorbit Pune was opened in 2011 in Vadgaon Sheri, Pune. It has a gross leasable area of 547,000 square feet. In May 2011, Faces Cosmetics opened its first store in India at Inorbit Pune and in July 2011, Cinemax launched a four screen multiplex at the mall. In 2012, the Essel Group chose Inorbit Pune to launch the first outlet of EsselWorld Freeze. The mall was permanently closed in November 2016, except the PVR Multiplex.

== Inorbit Hyderabad ==
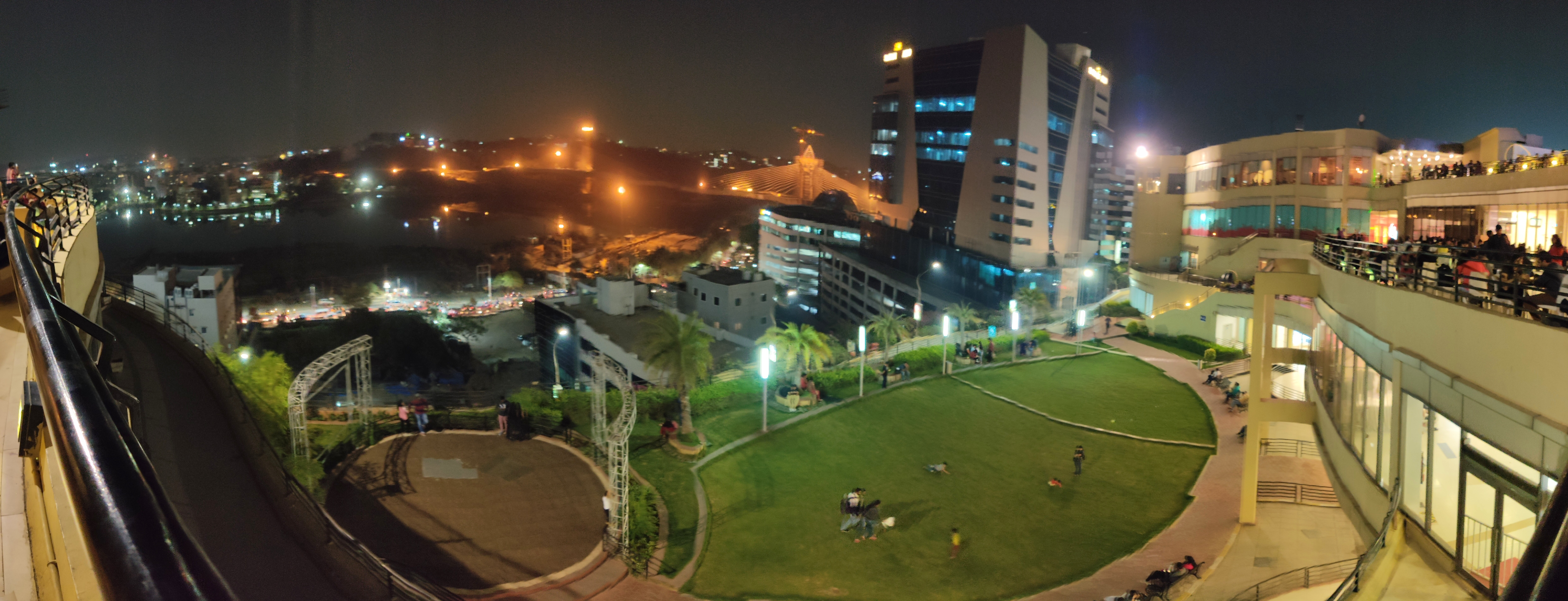
Inorbit Mall, Hyderabad houses a rooftop food-court overlooking the cable-stayed bridge over the Lake Durgamcheruvu.

Inorbit Cyberabad (Hyderabad) has a gross leasable area of 800,000 square feet. It was launched in 2009 and is also the biggest of all the Inorbit malls. It is located at Mindspace, Madhapur in Hitech City, Hyderabad.

== Inorbit Whitefield ==
Inorbit Whitefield has a gross leasable area of 339,000 square feet. The mall was opened in 2012. It was located in Whitefield, Bengaluru. This mall was closed in 2021.

== Inorbit Vadodara ==
Inorbit Vadodara has a gross leasable area of 474,000 square feet. The mall was inaugurated in 2013 and is located on Bhailal Amin Marg (Alembic Road) in Gorwa. It is one of the largest malls of Vadodara.

== Inorbit Hubballi ==
Inorbit Hubballi was opened in August 2025 and is located on Gokul Road, Hubballi. It has a gross leasable area of 500,000 sq ft.

== Inorbit Visakhapatnam ==
In July 2022, it was announced that Raheja Group will open Inorbit Mall in Visakhapatnam near Saligramapuram. The mall was constructed on a 16.3 acres land allotted by the Visakhapatnam Port Authority and opened to the public in March 2026.

== Acquisitions ==
In 2011, it was reported that Inorbit was interested in buying under-construction malls in Delhi and Kochi to expand its business.

In 2026, Inorbit acquired Prozone malls at Chhatrapati Sambhajinagar (Aurangabad) and Coimbatore.
