= Gorwa =

Neighborhood of Vadodara, Gujarat

- neighbourhood
- Location in Gujarat, India Gorwa (India)
- Coordinates: 22°19′48.36″N 73°09′39.96″E
- Country: India
- State: Gujarat
- District: Vadodara

Languages
  - Official: Gujarati, Hindi
- Time zone: UTC+5:30 (IST)
- Vehicle registration: GJ
- Avg. annual temperature: 43 °C (109 °F) - 12 °C (54 °F)
- Avg. summer temperature: 43 °C (109 °F) - 26 °C (79 °F)
- Avg. winter temperature: 33 °C (91 °F) - 12 °C (54 °F)
- Website: gujaratindia.com

Gorwa is a residential-commercial area in the Vadodara district of the Gujarat State in India. Gorwa lies on the north-western part of the Vadodara Municipal Corporation (VMC) limits. It is also known as 'Gorva'. The place is famous due to 'Gorwa lake', which lies in the downtown of this settlement. Situated almost on the border of the urban city limits, Gorwa situated in the middle of the Bhailal Amin Road in Vadodara. Gorwa has mixture of both residential and commercial sites along with numerous restaurants, medical centers and one of the biggest and the oldest vegetable market of Vadodara.

== About ==
Gorwa is situated in Vadodara, Gujarat, India, and its geographical coordinates are 22° 19' 0" North, 73° 10' 0" East and its original name (with diacritics) is Gorwa.

Gorwa is connected by 2 major roadways. The first is the Bhailal Amin Marg (BA Road), connecting Gorwa to the outer city-sites of IOC and IPCL industrial areas on one side and the colonies of Alembic and Fatehgunj on the other. The second major road is the Sardar patel Road, connecting Gorwa to the famous Race-Course circle and Alkapuri, the economic hub of Vadodara, on one side and merging with the Bhailal Amin Marg on the other end.

Gorwa was originally a village and remained so until the late 1980s, when the Industrial boom in Vadodara saw a great influx of people from all around the country looking for a cheap residential accommodation. Majority of the residential areas in Gorwa are managed by the Gujarat Housing Board (GHB), a government undertaking. Few of the famous residential societies in Gorwa are Parishram park, Laxmikunj Society, Adarsh Duplex, Akansha Duplex, Millenium Society, Narmada Nagari, Vitthalesh Bunglows housing projects from GHB and many more. It has many medical clinics and centers spear across, but the nearest major Hospitals like the Bhailal Amin General Hospital and the Sterling-Unity Hospital are less than 10 kilometers away. Gorwa also houses the Gorwa Industrial Estate and the famous Industrial Training Institute (I.T.I).

Gorwa is also known for its Garba-Navratri celebrations that takes place every year near the Lakshmipura substation ground. Counting by the size of the garba circle, this is one of the biggest in Vadodara city. United Way of Baroda Garba Mahotsav is also a major attraction of Gorwa organized at Alembic Ground. The most happening mall of Baroda InOrbit Mall is also located at Gorwa.

== Railway Connection ==
The major Railway Junction is the Vadodara Junction. However, many small and medium standard railway stations are within reachable distance. Few of the nearest stations are: Vadodara (5.6 km) Vishvāmitri (5.3 km) Goya Gate (7.3 km) Chhayapuri (8 km) Bājuva (8.3 km) Bhaili (9.4 km) Rānoli (15.2 km) Pilol (16.7 km) Kelanpur (18.2 km) Alindra Road (24.6 km) Itola (26.6 km) Rānu Pipri (27.2 km) Ānklāv (28 km) Vyankatpura (32.5 km) Bhilupur (32.6 km) Adās Road (33.1 km) Ajwa (33.1 km) Karchia (34.1 km) Samlāya (36.7 km) Antoli (37.9 km) Mobha Road (38.1 km) Nāvli (40.3 km) Thuwāvi (41.7 km) Karmaliyapura (41.7 km) Prayagpura Flag Station (44.9 km) Vesanpura (46.8 km) Mevli (53.7 km) Wadwāna (54 km)

== Neighbouring Areas ==
Few populated places near Gorwa are: Gorwa (0 km) Vadodara (5.6 km) Koyali (4.0 km) Sursi (11.7 km) Sokhda (15.9 km) Anghad (16.3 km) Padra (18.1 km) Umeta (7 km) Vāsad (20 km) Tundāo (27 km) Rawāl (27.7 km) Jarod (30.9 km) Bhādarwa (32.2 km) Vāghodia (32.2 km) Dabka (33.9 km) Nāpād (39.8 km) Sārsa (40 km) Bhādran (36 km) Sāvli (40.5 km) Borsad (36 km) Miyāgām (43.2 km) Dabhoi (44.9 km) Nāhāpa (45.5 km)

== Water Reservoir ==
This list gives the names of any artificial pond or lake or tank near Gorwa. Wardala Tank (36.2 km) Karchia Tank (41 km) Hanumān Tank (43.4 km) Wadwana Tank (52.8 km)

== Rivers ==
Mahi River (12. km) Tamsi River (45 km)

== Notable people ==
- Hardik Pandya - An Indian cricketer, was resident of this neighborhood late 1990s to 2017.
