= Durgam Cheruvu =

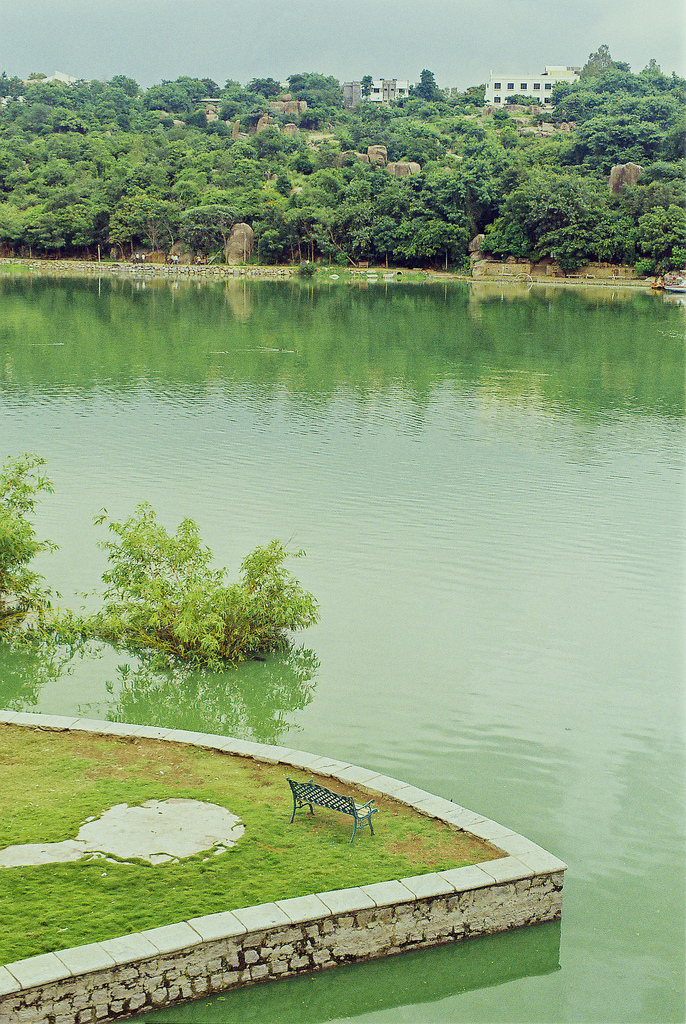
- Durgam Cheruvu in 2010

- Location within Hyderabad Location within Telangana Location within India
- Coordinates: 17.42886°N 78.387794°E
- Type: lake
- Managing agency: Hyderabad Metropolitan Development Authority
- Max. length: 3.5 kilometres (2.2 mi)
- Surface area: 83 acres (34 ha)
- Max. depth: 28 feet (8.5 m)
- Water volume: 1,679,430 cubic metres (1,361.54 acre⋅ft)
- Settlements: Hyderabad, India

Durgam Cheruvu, also known as Raidurgam Cheruvu, is a freshwater lake located in Rangareddy district, Telangana, India. The lake, which is spread over 83 acres (34 ha), is located near the city of Hyderabad. The lake is also known as Secret Lake because it is hidden between the localities of Jubilee Hills, Madhapur and Raidurg. The Durgam Cheruvu Bridge, which traverses the lake, was inaugurated in September 2020.

== History ==
Under the rule of the Qutub Shahi dynasty (ca. 1518–1687), this lake served as the drinking water source for the residents of Golconda Fort.

== Species Diversity ==
As of June 2024, there are 149 bird species recorded at Durgam Cheruvu on eBird.

== Tourism ==
In 2001, the tourism department of the local government initiated steps to promote the lake as a tourist destination. As a part of this, five boats were to be deployed at the lake.

In 2002, the lake started to become a destination for people who go for fishing as a pastime. Few people from the nearby city of Hyderabad travel to this lake on the weekends to relax and enjoy fishing. To capitalise on the visitors, the local agencies expanded their tourism plans by turning the lake into a fishing zone. As a part of the various beautification steps, the area surrounding the lake was illuminated, artificial waterfalls, a rock garden and a floating fountain were added. In addition to this, proper seating arrangements, a 2 kilometres (1.2 mi) walking/running track and restaurants were established. Adventure activities like rock climbing, trekking, rappelling, an art gallery and a sculptor park for artists were also introduced as attractions. An amphitheater, with a capacity to hold 1,500 people at a time, was also added for public access. The entire exercise was completed at a cost of ₹20 million (US$210,000).

In 2018, the lake bund was upgraded with walkways as part of CSR activity by K Raheja group.

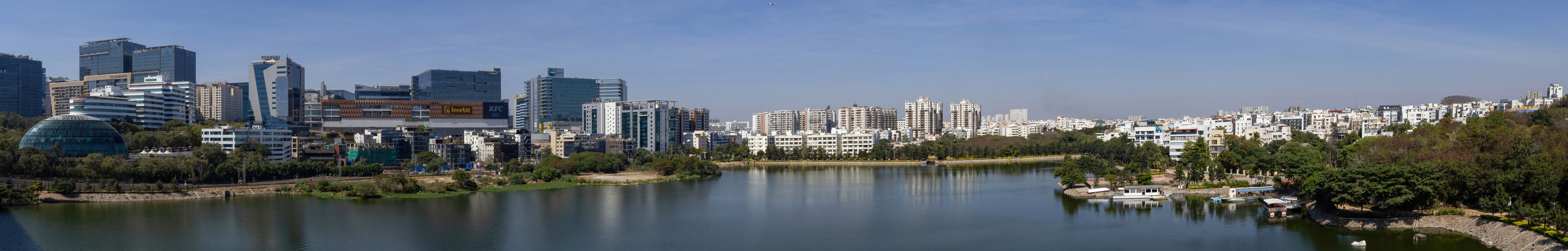
Panoramic view of the city of Hyderabad from the Durgam Churuvu lake

=== Durgam Cheruvu Lake Front Park ===
The lake front park was inaugurated on August 28, 2018 by Mr. K. T. Rama Rao.

=== Durgam Cheruvu Cable Bridge ===
The Durgam Cheruvu Cable Bridge is an extradosed bridge in Hyderabad. It links Jubilee Hills to Madhapur and Hitech City.

== Controversies and pollution ==
Because of the unique rock formations abutting the lake, it was designated as a protected area. In 2001, the state high court issued an order to the local pollution board and the city's water supply and sewerage board not to allow development of new residential localities near the lake. Furthermore, the court order also asked these agencies to take immediate steps for prevention or collection and treatment of domestic sewage flowing into the lake from the residential colonies in the vicinity and catchment area of the lake. Despite these notifications, the local agencies have failed in controlling both pollution and illegitimate constructions on the lake bed.

To tackle pollution in the lake, sewage treatment plants were set up by the local pollution control board in 2006. As years passed by, the plant became non-functional. A separate sewerage treatment plant (STP) was set up at Durgam Cheruvu by the Hyderabad Metropolitan Water Supply and Sewerage Board, after Government of Telangana approved it in 2022.

Durgam Cheruvu is now a place to relax. There is an amphitheatre, and the On the Rocks cafeteria. Boating is also available. A cable bridge with dancing fountain also adorns the lake.

== Gallery ==
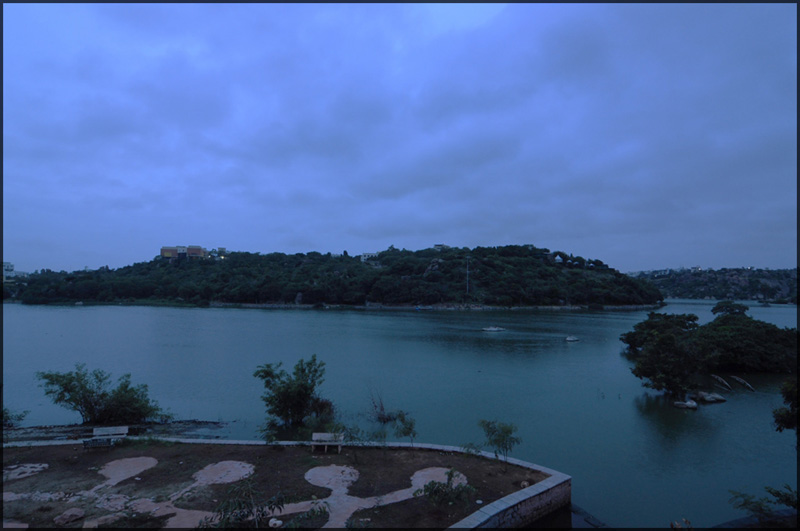
Early morning at Durgum Cheruvu

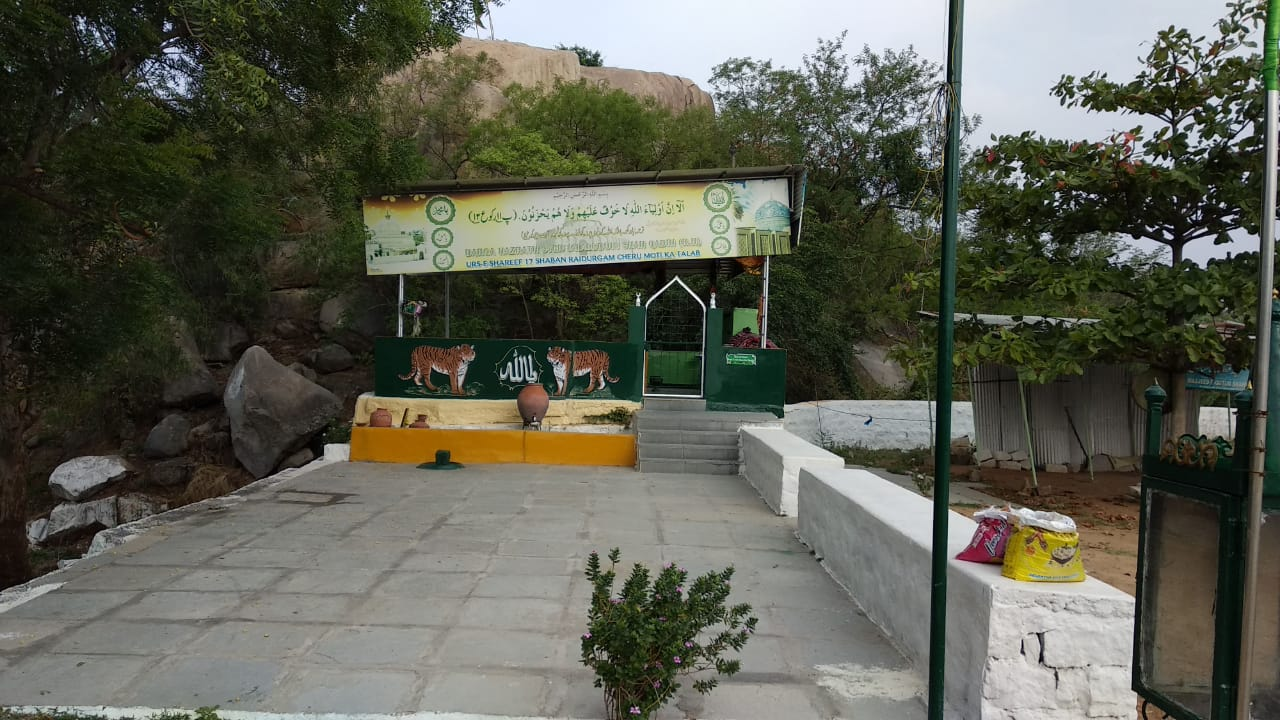
Masjid at Raya Durgam Cheruvu Bund

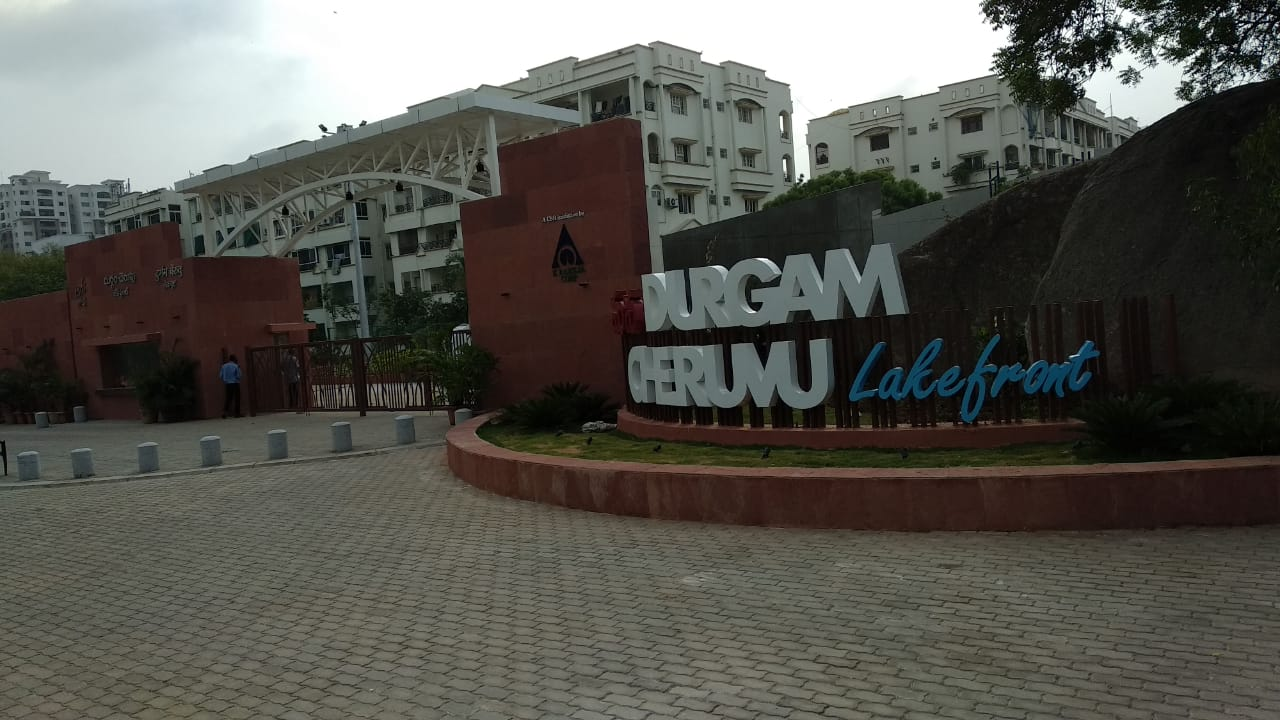
Raya Durgam Cheruvu Lake front

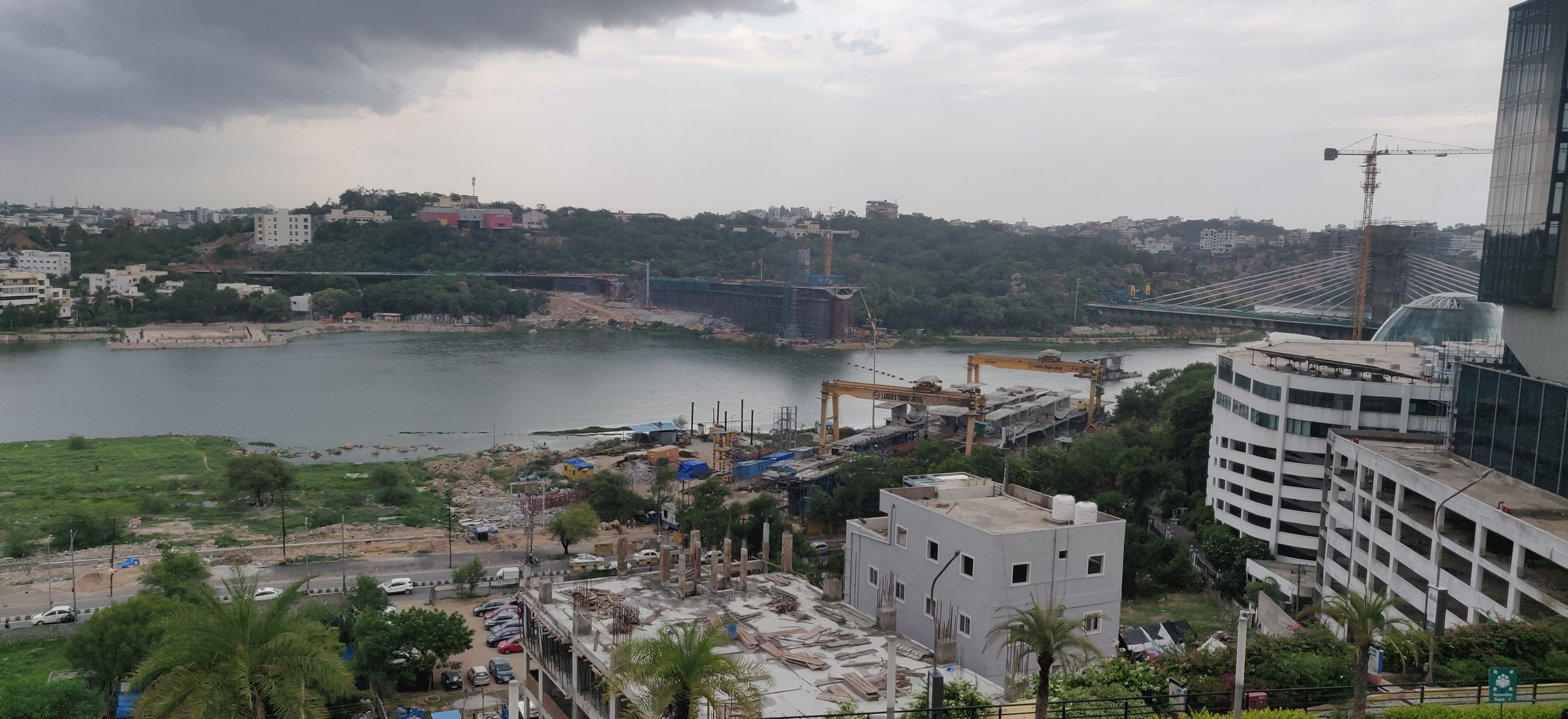
Durgam Cheruvu bridge under construction

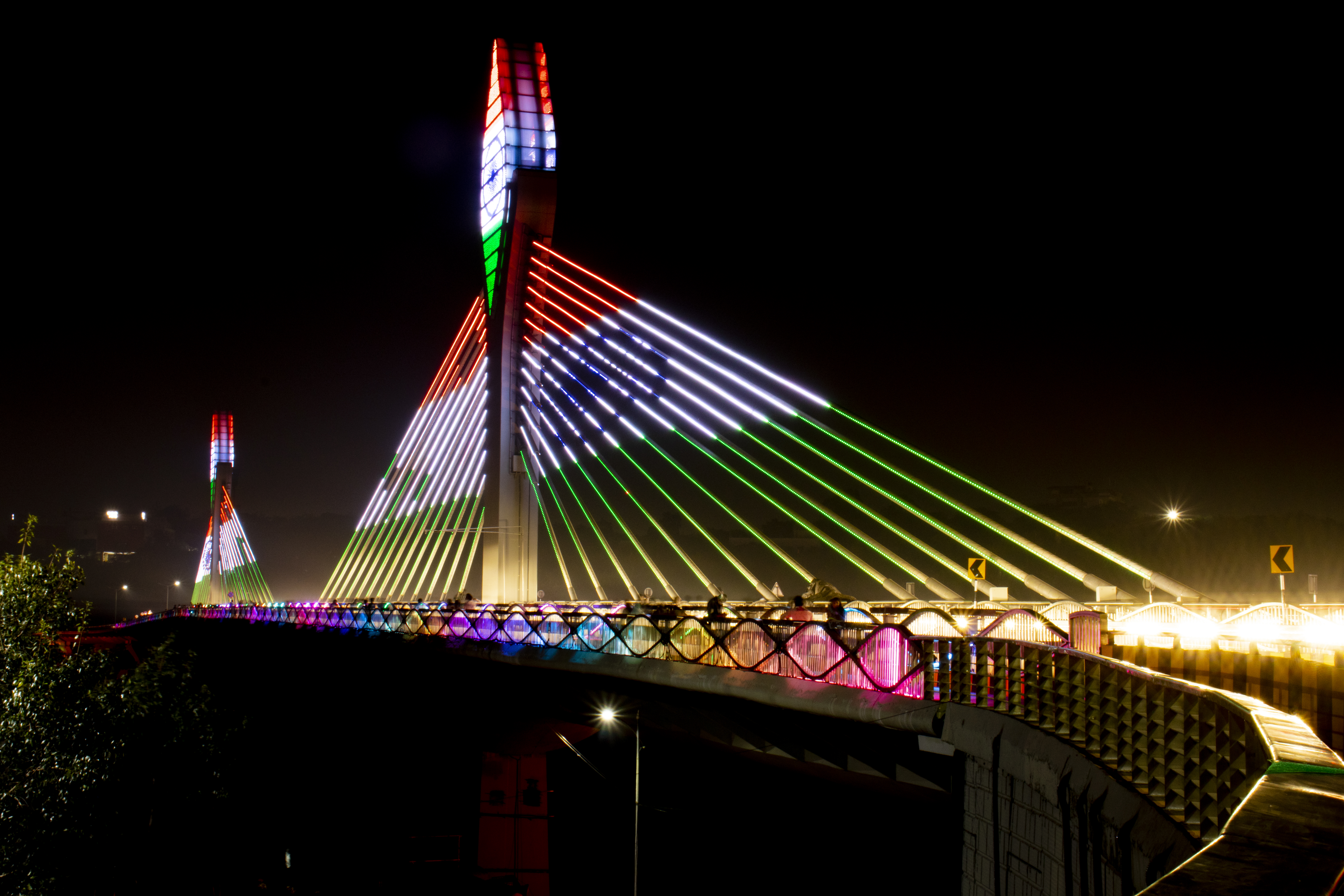
Durgam Cheruvu bridge illuminated at night

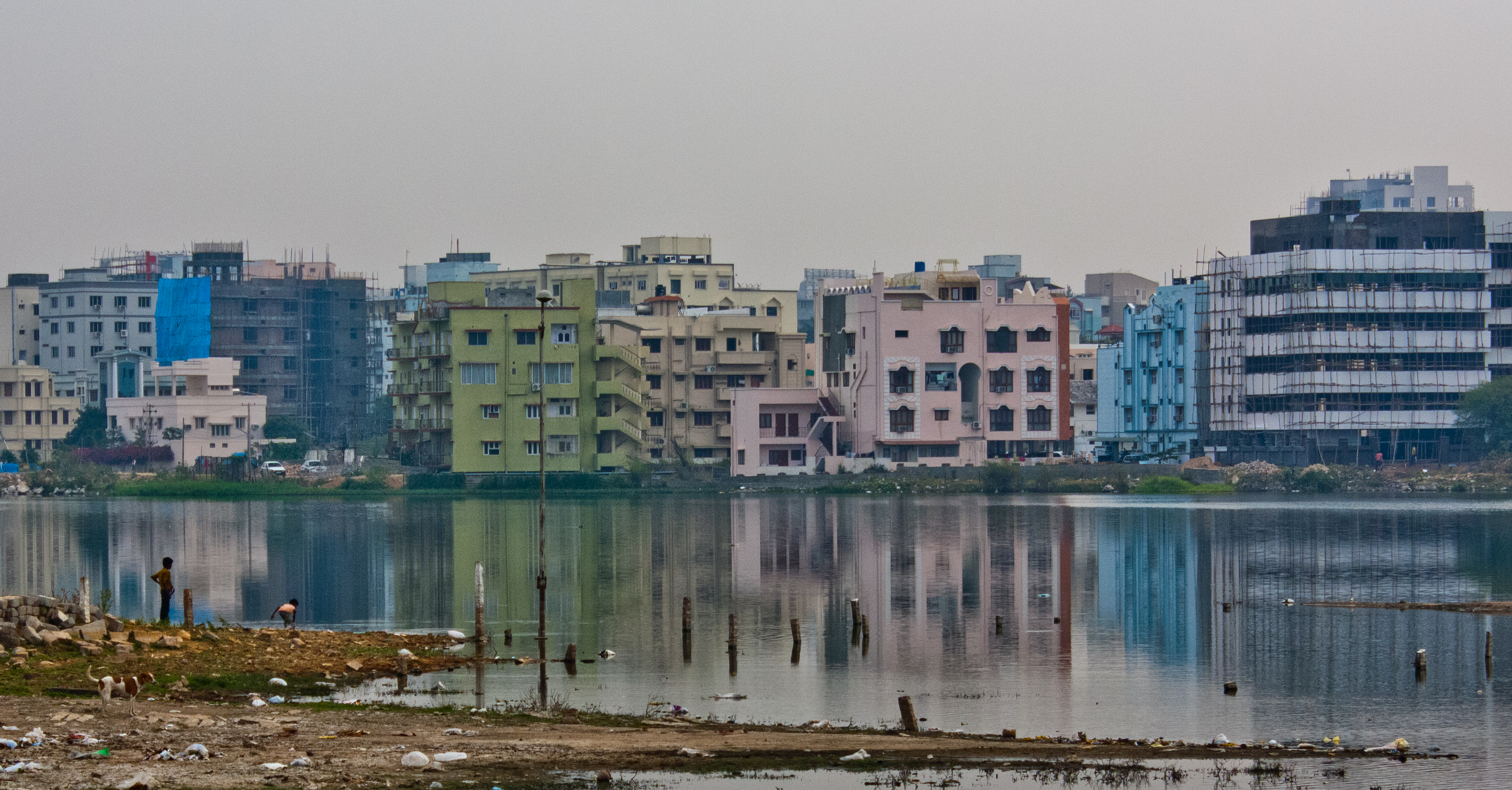
Durgam Cheruvu near HITEC City being slowly encroached by expanding city

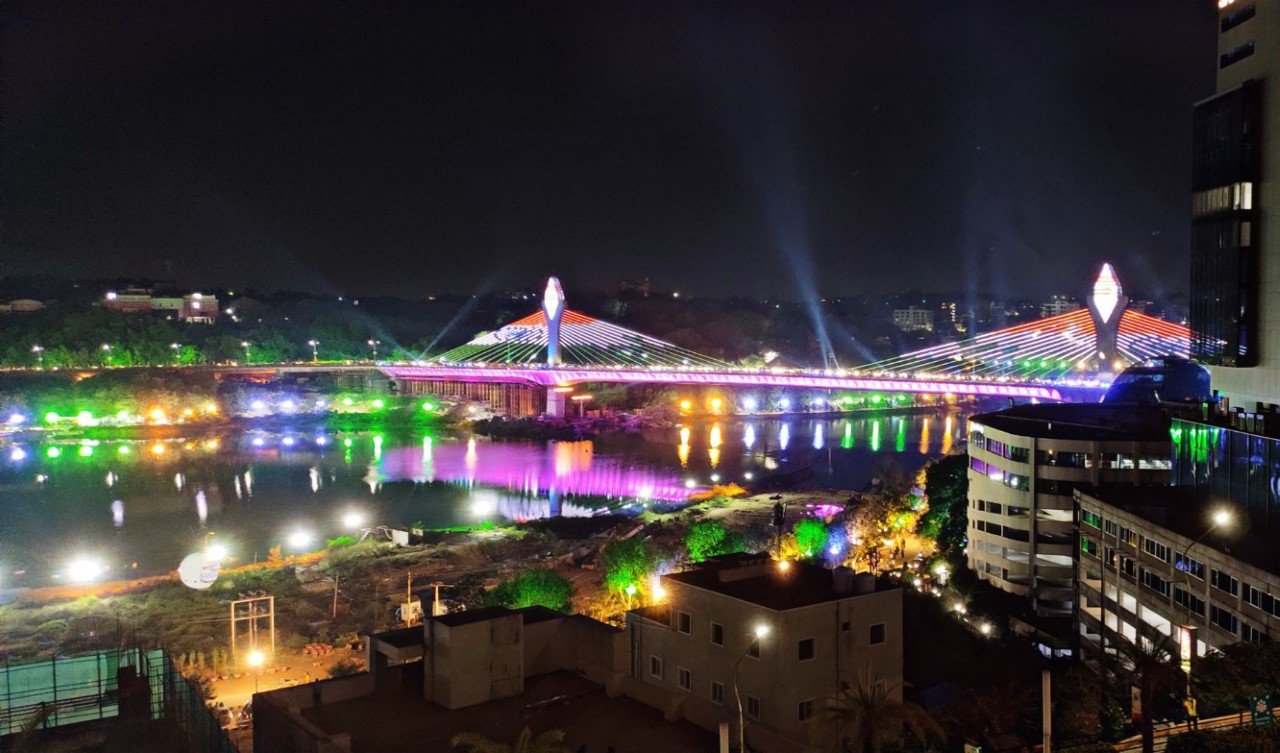
Durgam Cheruvu bridge after construction
