= Madhapur =

Madhapur Hitech City
- Neighbourhood
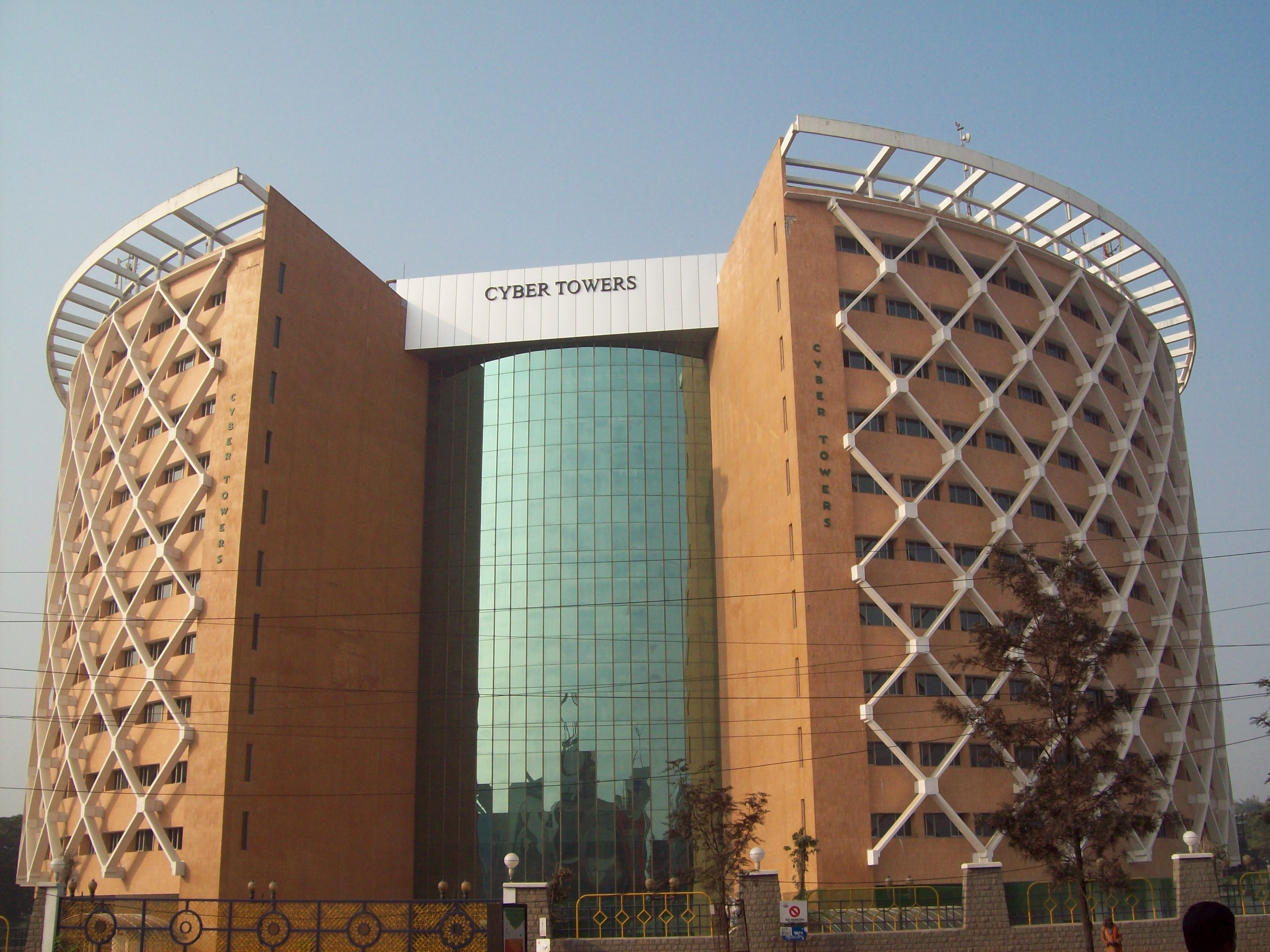
- Cyber Towers at Madhapur

- Location in Hyderabad Location in Telangana Madhapur (India)
- Coordinates: 17°26′30″N 78°23′30″E
- Country: India
- State: Telangana
- District: Rangareddy
- City: Hyderabad

Government
  - Type: Municipal Corporation
  - Body: Greater Hyderabad Municipal Corporation

Area
  - Neighbourhood: 7.06 km^{2} (2.73 sq mi)

Population (2020)
  - Neighbourhood: 97,750
  - Density: 13,851/km^{2} (35,870/sq mi)
  - Metro: 300,000

Languages
  - Official: Telugu
- Time zone: UTC+5:30 (IST)
- PIN: 500 081
- Vehicle registration: TG-07
- Lok Sabha constituency: Chevella
- Vidhan Sabha constituency: Serilingampally
- Civic agency: GHMC
- Planning agency: HMDA

Madhapur is a neighbourhood of Hyderabad, India. It is noted as a centre of information technology activity. The heart of this area is called HITEC City which has the highest concentration of IT/ITES establishments in the city. Located in Ranga Reddy district of Telangana, It is administered as Ward No. 107 of Greater Hyderabad Municipal Corporation. Madhapur is within 2 kilometres (1.2 mi) of the residential and commercial suburb of Jubilee Hills .

== Geography ==
The entire city sits below 550m. The official elevation sits at about 576m. In the southeast corner of the city, next to the Inorbit Mall, there is a lake named Durgam Cheruvu which is being destroyed by the construction activities in that area affecting the swans in the lake.

== Economy ==
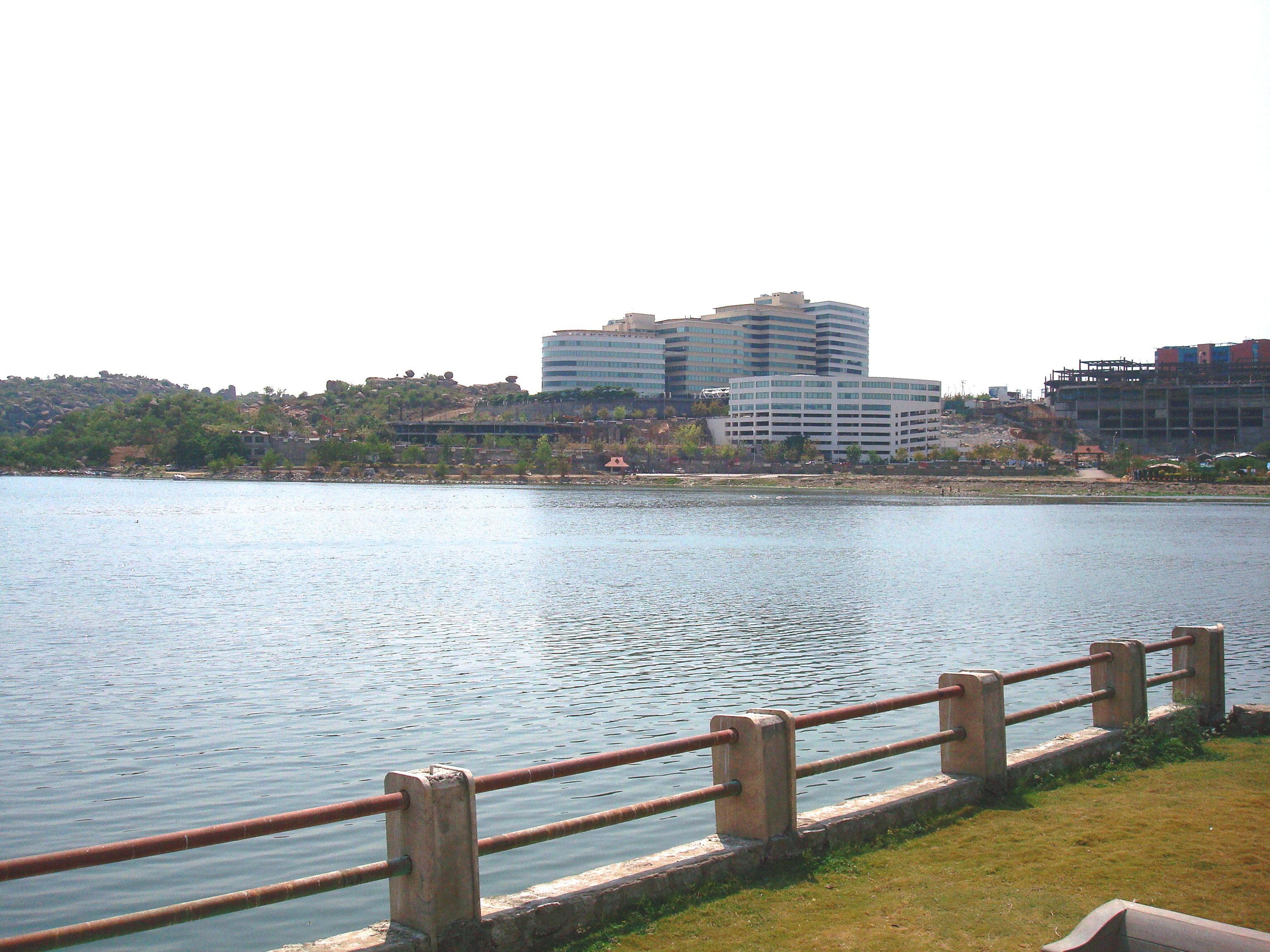
Lake Durgam, located close to the Hitec city

Madhapur has transformed from a small, rocky village in the early 1990s into a modern IT and BPO hub. Madhapur has made its mark on the city map by having the highest concentration of IT/ITES companies in Hyderabad city. Top IT/ITES and Telco companies from all over the world are located in this suburb, fuelling the software and BPO businesses. Cyber Towers, Cyber Gateway and Cyber Pearl were the first IT structures to come up. Later on big names like Broadcom, Qualcomm, CSC, Tata Communications, Accenture, Tata Consultancy Services, Automatic Data Processing(ADP), NTT Data, Tech Mahindra, Prolifics Corporation, Deloitte, Amazon.com, Convergys, Oracle Corporation, IBM, Dell, Google, Verizon, CA Inc., Infosys, Wipro, Tata Consultancy Services, AppLabs, Invensys, Keane, Cognizant, Patni, Ram info solutions, Cyient, Capital IQ, Genpact, Novartis, Deloitte, Sitel India, Colruyt, Netcracker Technology and many others have made the city their business centre.

This suburb is also home to National Institute of Fashion Technology (NIFT), Sri Venkateshwara college of Architecture: Sri Venkateshwara college of Arts and pharmacy college, Manthan International School and CGR International school, which are leading new International Schools in Hyderabad.

Real estate is on the rise with names such as Ramky Estates, Aparna, Aliens, Lanco Infratech and many others constructing skyscrapers, luxury homes, SEZs etc. Companies choosing Madhapur for their business ventures have made Madhapur an integrated and modern city.

Madhapur also has become the preferred meeting place, with many international conferences and meetings taking place at Hitex Convention Center and Hotel Novotel, Hotels like Westine, Lemon Tree, Trident and other business hotels in surrounding areas like Banjara Hills and Jubilee Hills has enhanced the value of Madhapur over the last decade.

== Transport and infrastructure ==
TSRTC, a state-owned bus service, connects Madhapur with other parts of the city. The bus numbers plying to Madhapur are 10H, 127K, 222A. Madhapur is served by MMTS train service, the station is HiTech City Station, which is a kilometer away. Taxis and autos shuttle between the station and the city. Hyderabad Metro Rail is also available at a distance.

Inner and outer ring roads are being developed to ease traffic during peak hours, and also to provide connectivity to the new Hyderabad International Airport near Shamshabad.

== Hospitals ==
- Hegde Fertility
- Medicover Hospitals
- Oakridge Hospitals
- Image Hospital
- FirstHealth Diagnostics

== Landmarks ==
- Botanical gardens – 3 km (1.9 mi) from Madhapur
- Cyber gateway
- Cyber Pearl
- Cyber Towers
- Durgam cheruvu
- Fortune Towers
- HITEX Convention Centre
- Image Hospital
- Inorbit Mall
- Mind Space campus
- Peddamma Temple – 4 km (2.5 mi) from Madhapur
- Shilparamam Auditorium, Arts and crafts centre
- State Gallery of Art, Chitramayee
- Vanenberg IT Park
