= Hyderabad Botanical Garden =

Botanical garden in Hyderabad, India

Hyderabad Botanical Gardens
- Sri Kotla Vijaybhaskar Reddy Botanical Gardens
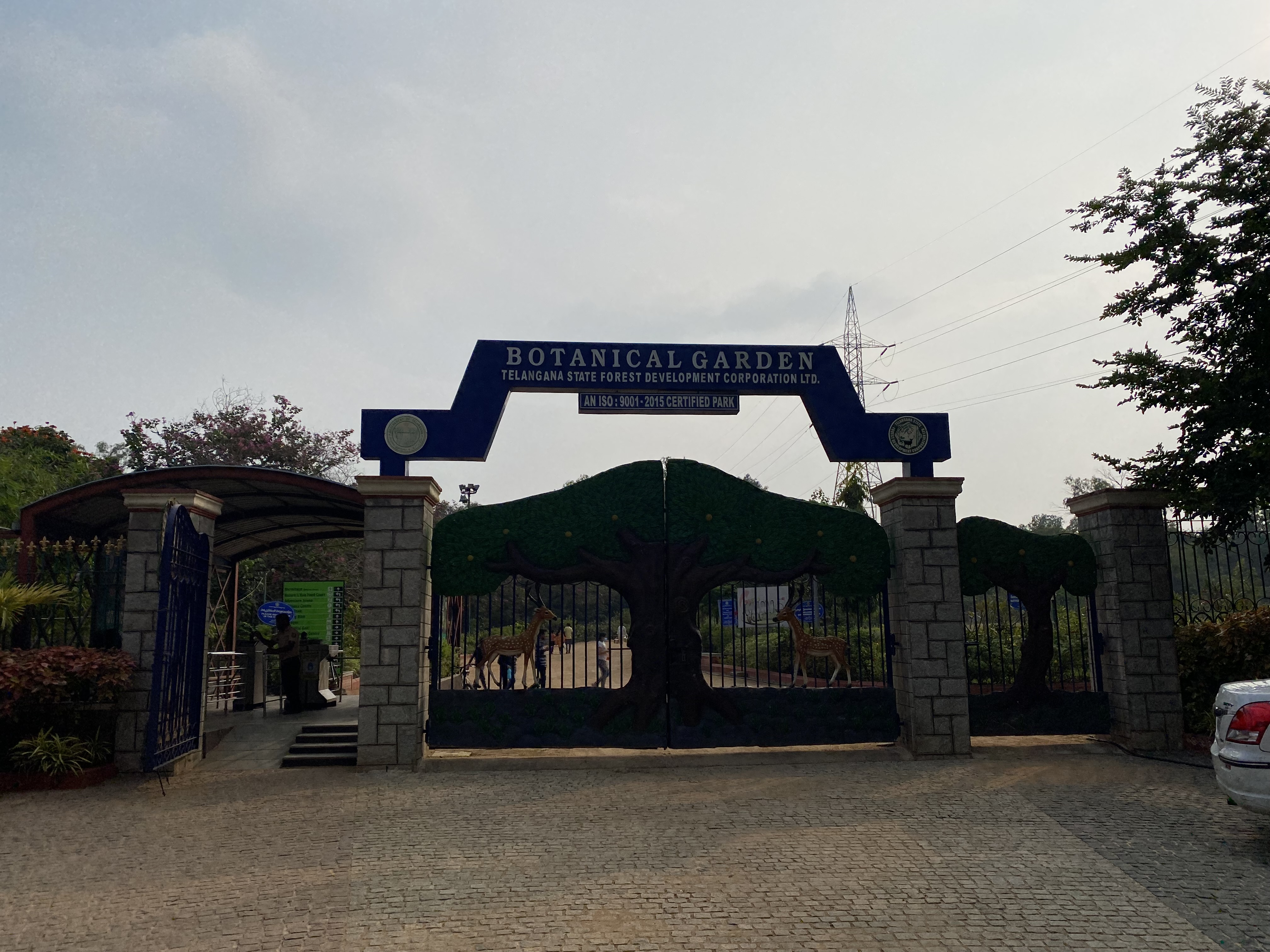
- Main entrance to the Hyderabad Botanical Garden

- Location within Telangana Location within India Location within Asia Location within Earth
- Type: Urban park
- Location: Kothaguda, Hyderabad, Telangana
- Coordinates: 17.455°N 78.357°E
- Area: 270 acres (1.1 km^{2})
- Status: Open all year

Hyderabad Botanical Gardens or Sri Kotla Vijaya Bhaskara Reddy Botanical Garden is a botanical garden is located in Kothaguda, Kondapur, Hitec City, Hyderabad, Telangana. It was developed by the Telangana Forest Department and is near the HITEC City, Madhapur, 16 kilometres (10 mi) from Hyderabad Railway station on the Hyderabad-Mumbai old Highway. The park is named after Kotla Vijaya Bhaskara Reddy, former chief minister of Andhra Pradesh.

== The garden ==
The botanical garden aims at providing the facility of a modern botanical garden to conserve and develop the germ plasm and to educate the people. The garden is spread over 270 acres (1.1 km^{2}) of undulating land and have 19 sectors or 'Vanams'. The first phase is open to the public, with the completion of five sections. The sections include medicinal plants, timber trees, fruit trees, ornamental plants, aquatic plants, bamboos and so on. The park is designed to have large water bodies, rolling meadows, natural forests, rich grasslands and exquisite rock formations.

In July 2018, Telangana minister K. T. Rama Rao inaugurated the newly developed recreational facilities at the botanical garden such as Nakshatra Vanam, Rasi Vanam and Navagraha Vanam.

== Location ==
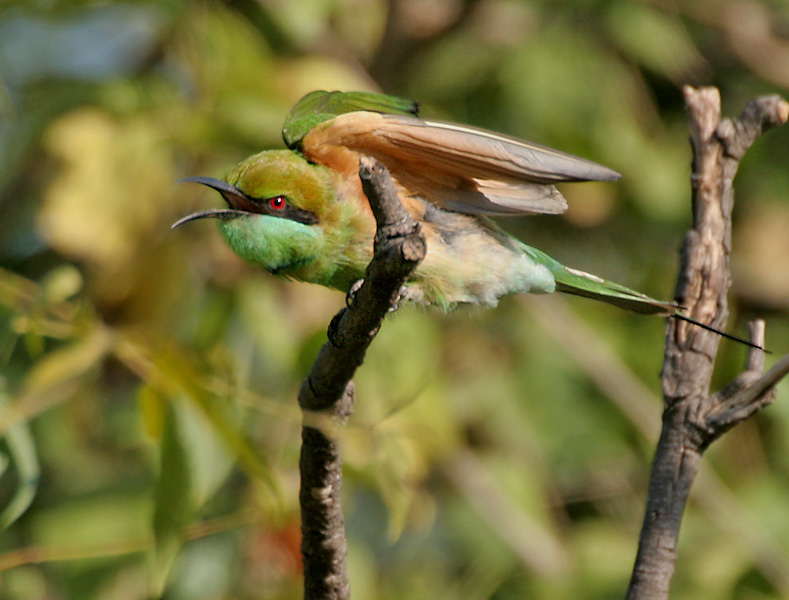
Asian green bee-eater (Merops orientalis) in the botanical garden

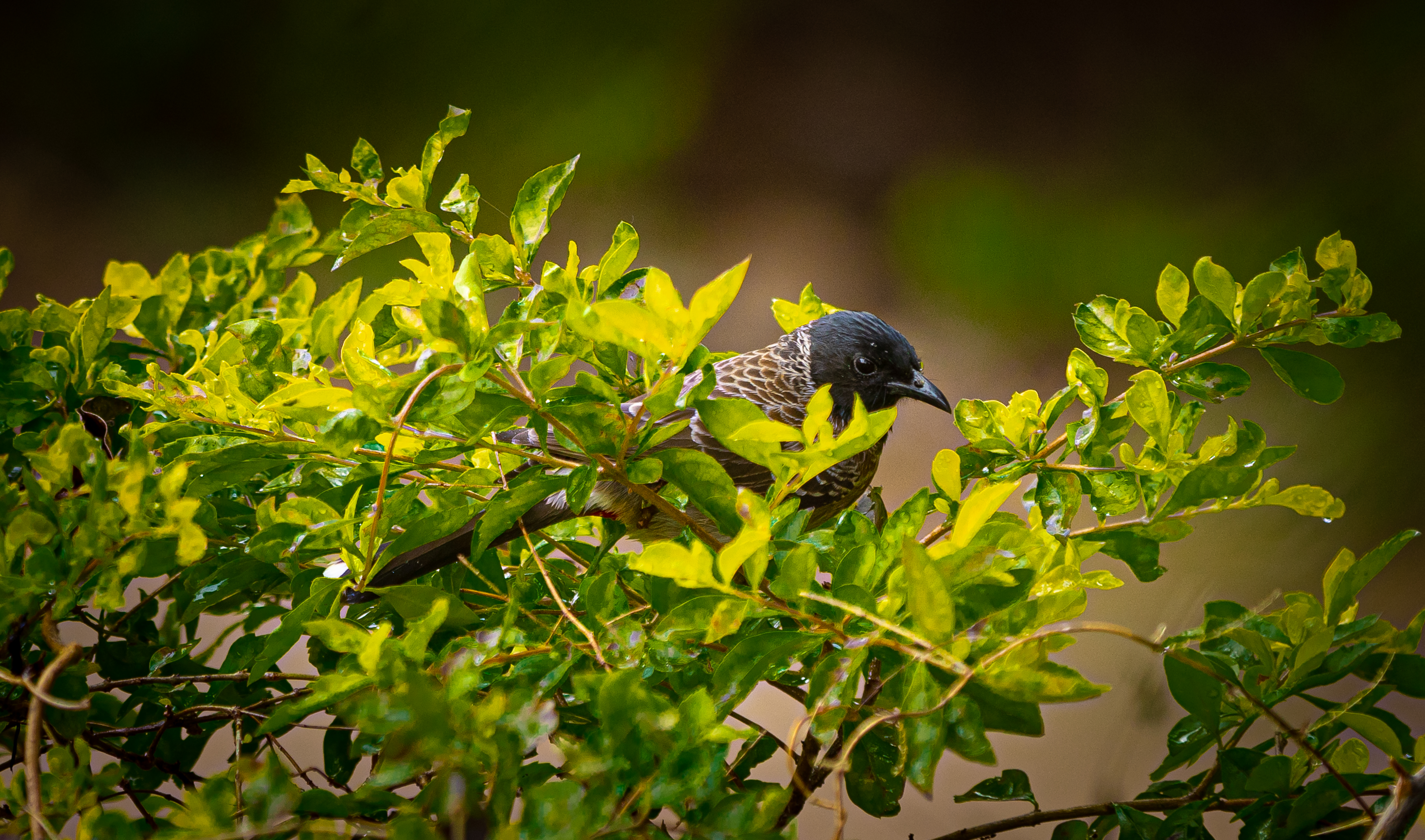
Red-vented Bulbul (Pycnonotus cafer) in the garden

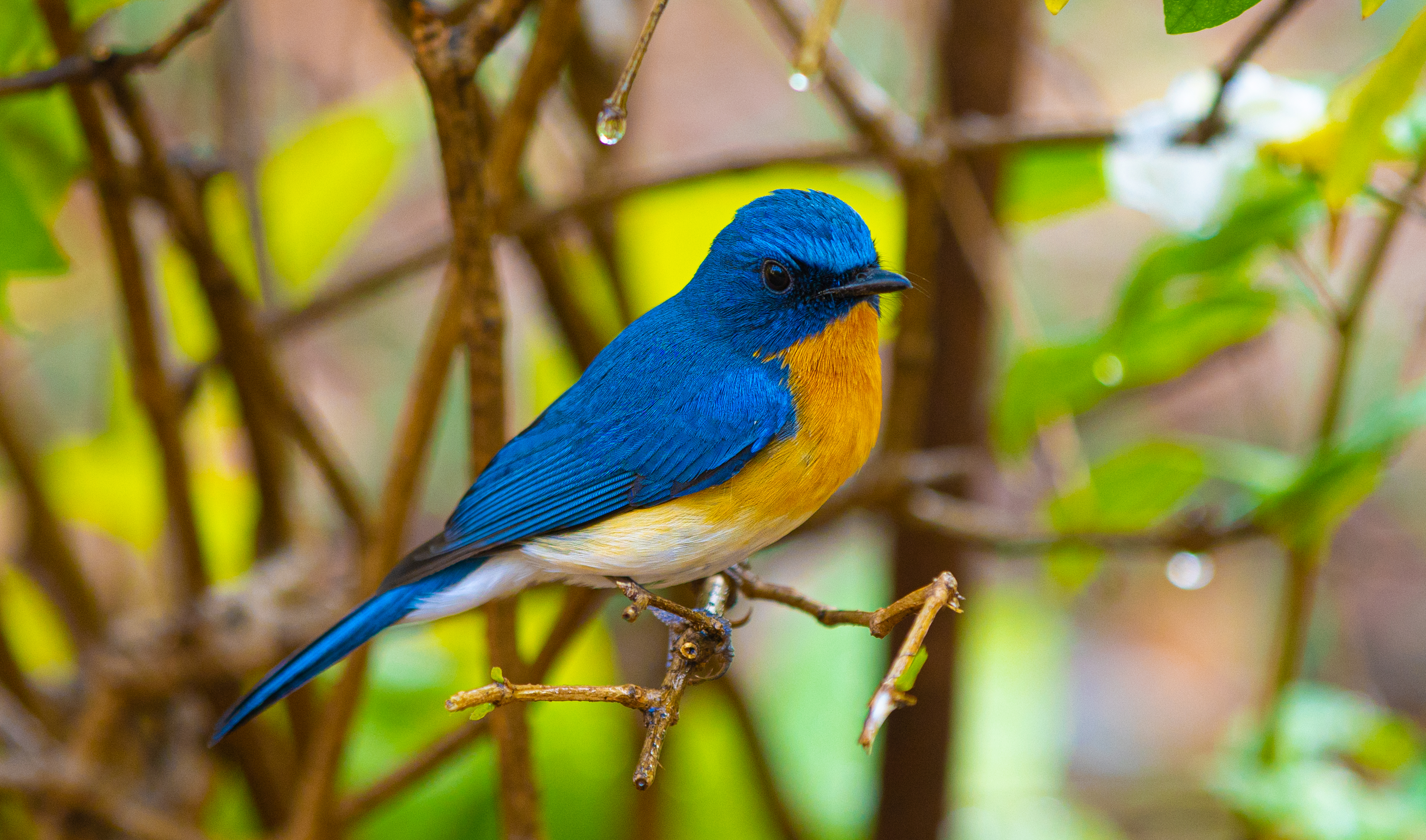
Tickell's Blue Flycatcher (Cyornis tickelliae)

An eco-tourist destination, the botanical garden is in Kothaguda, Kondapur, near the Hi-tech City, approximately 16 kilometers from Hyderabad. Tents are available for longer visits. The nearest landmarks to this botanical Garden are Spar (retailer) Hypermarket, The Platina, Radisson Hotel and Ambicare Clinics, White Fields.

The paved walkways take you through the 19 sections (Vanaja) in the Patil. The bamboo and palm sectors are major attractions, with varieties of bamboo trees separated by a 3-metre (10 ft) distance. Special signboards are erected at each bamboo variety indicating its generic and scientific names. The palm sector has diverse species. Here you can find a variety of flowers in abundance, such as yellow and purple cosmos, blue salvia, red raselia, etc.

== Birdlife ==
Over 150 species of bird are found in the gardens, such as two species of fantails, wagtails, flycatchers, and bulbuls.

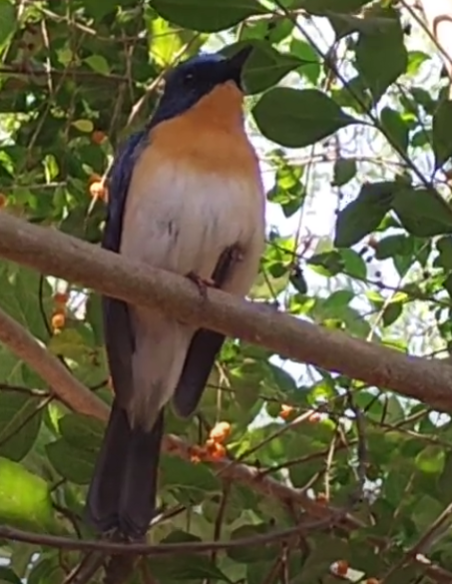

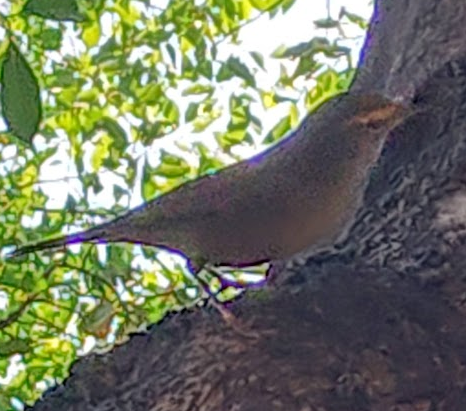

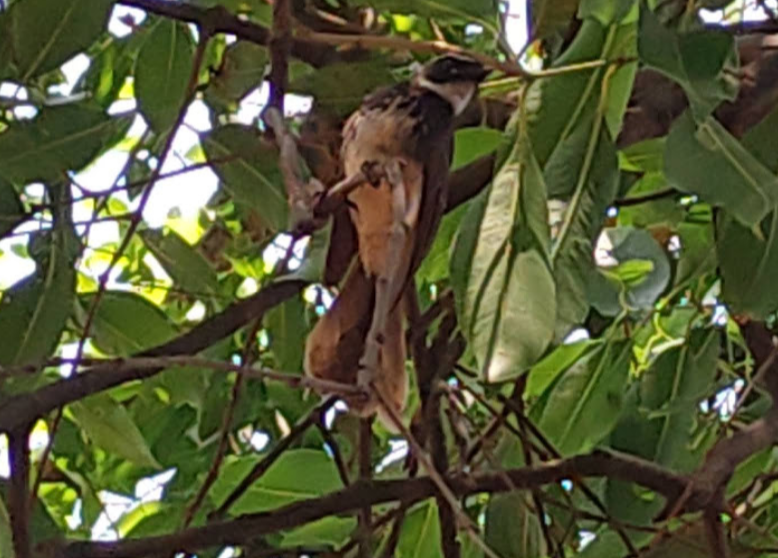

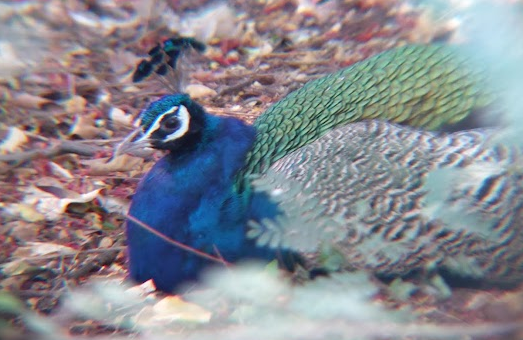

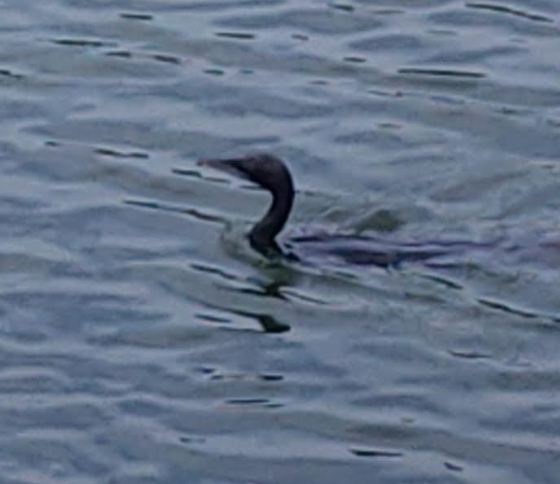

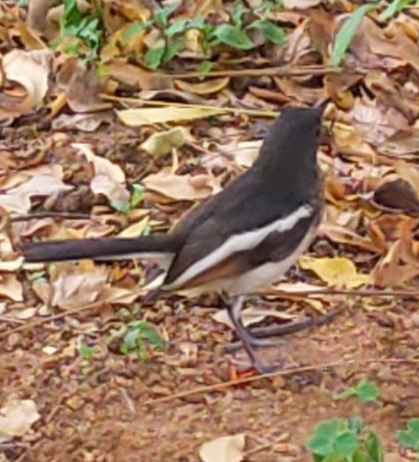

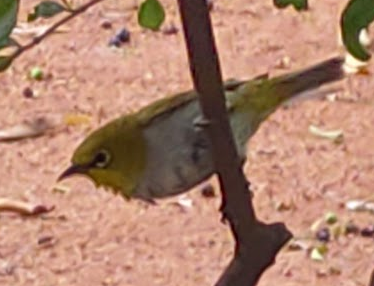

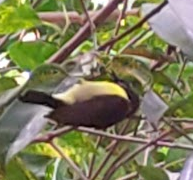

== See also ==
- Nehru Zoological Park
- Biodiversity park, Hyderabad
- Kothwalguda Eco Park
- Biodiversity Park, Visakhapatnam
