= Serilingampally =

Serilingampally Lingampally
- Suburb
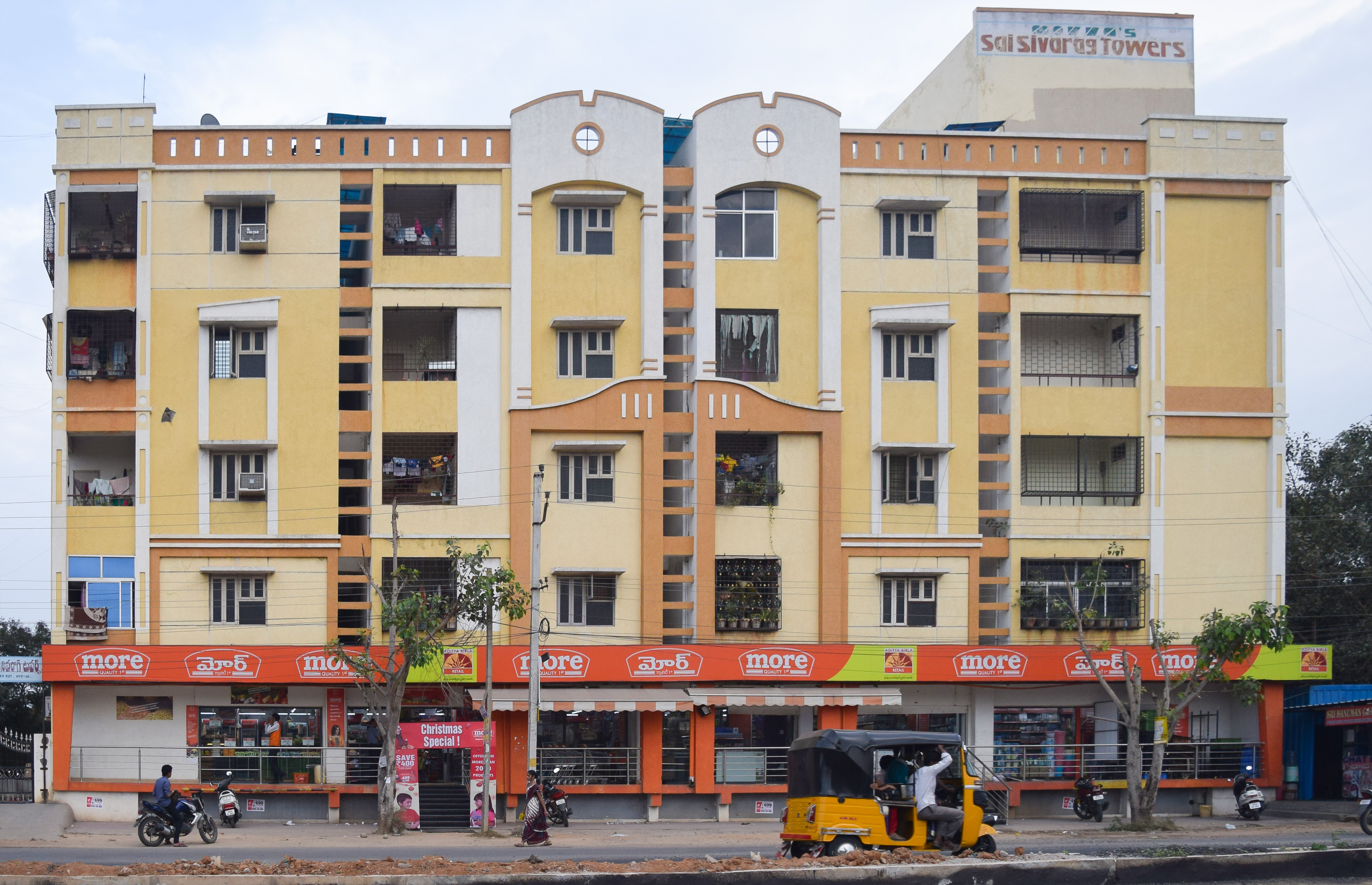
- A More store in Serilingampally

- Location in Hyderabad, Telangana, India Serilingampally (Telangana) Serilingampally (India)
- Coordinates: 17°28′48″N 78°19′48″E
- Country: India
- State: Telangana
- District: Ranga Reddy
- City: Hyderabad

Population (2011)
  - Total: 153,364

Languages
  - Official: Telugu
- Time zone: UTC+5:30 (IST)
- PIN: 500019
- Vehicle registration: TG-07
- Sex ratio: 107% ♂/♀

Serilingampally, also known as Lingampally, is a major suburb located in the north western part of Hyderabad city, India. It is the headquarters of the Serilingamapally mandal in the Ranga Reddy district of the Indian state of Telangana. It is administered by the Greater Hyderabad Municipal Corporation (GHMC). Due to its close proximity to HITEC City, Gachibowli, Nanakramguda, Manikonda and Kondapur, there has been a heavy influx of IT companies. A few of the tallest buildings in Hyderabad are located in Serilingampally, with Candeur Crescent being the tallest among them. University of Hyderabad (UoH) is also located here.

== Demographics ==
As of 2011 India census, Serilingampally had a population of 153,364 composed of 32,642 households. This population contains 79,225 males and 74,139 females. As of 2001 census, Serilingampally has an average literacy rate of 42%, lower than the national average of 59.5%: male literacy is 42%, and female literacy is 41%. In Serilingampally, 11% of the population is under 6 years of age.

== Industries ==
Patancheru, an industrial area in Medak district, is about 6 km from this area. Indian Immunologicals (serum and vaccine unit), State Bank Institute for Rural Banking, University of Hyderabad and International Institute of Information Technology are in Gachibowli area just 4 to 5 km away from Lingampally railway station. It is very close to the Bharat Heavy Electricals, Ramachandrapuram unit and is also located off the National Highway 65 leading to Pune.

== Transport ==
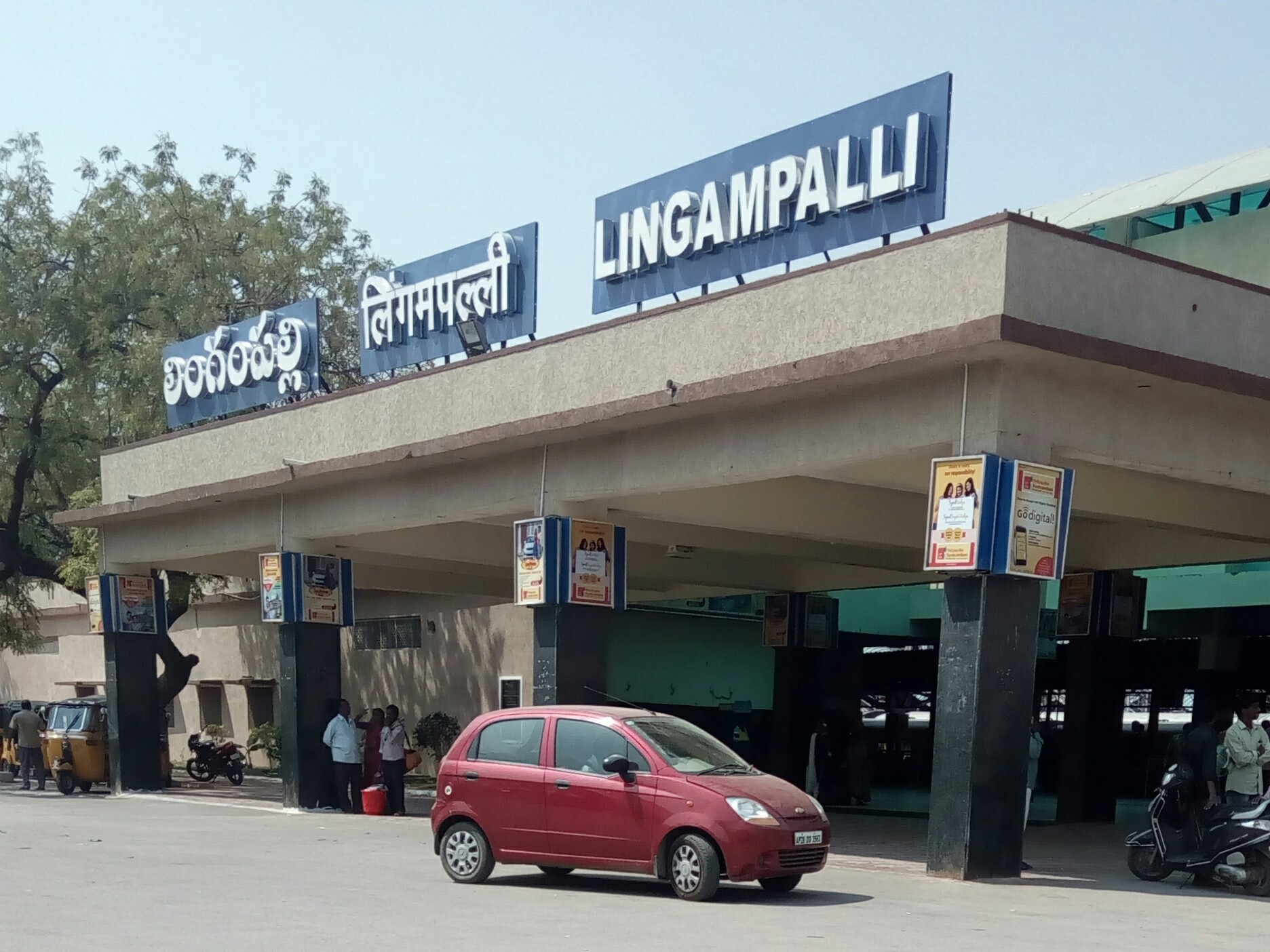
Entrance of Lingampally railway station

Lingampally has an MMTS train station, which is also its terminus, i.e., the train concludes its journey coming from Hyderabad and Falaknuma/ Secunderabad. Buses run by the TSRTC connect it to major parts of the city. Further, It is the origin station for most of the long journey stations like Mumbai, Bengaluru etc.

== Politics ==
MLA of Serilingampally Assembly constituency is Arekapudi Gandhi elected in the 2014 and 2018 general election and won from Telugu Desam Party and Bharat Rashtra Samithi parties, respectively.

Former MLA is M Bikshapathi Yadav from 2009 to 2014.

== Education ==
There are several schools, such as

- Vidya Niketan Model High School, Old Lingampally
- St. Rita High School, Miyapur
- Sahithi Vidya Niketan High school
- Vidyanjali high School
- ZPHS Lingampally
- Vidya Vani School
- Kalam Anji Reddy School
- Sri Chaitanya Techno School
- Triveni Talent school, Miyapur

== Notable people ==
- Tilak Varma, Indian Cricketer
- Korada Subrahmanyam (1954) - Sanskrit grammarian, scholar, and retired Professor of Sanskrit at the University of Hyderabad.
