= Whitefields, Hyderabad =

Residential locality in Hyderabad, Telangana, India

Whitefields is a residential locality in Hyderabad, Telangana, India. It is situated in the Kondapur area of western Hyderabad, in the vicinity of HITEC City and the city's western information-technology corridor.

== Location ==
Whitefields is located in the western part of Hyderabad and is generally identified with the Kondapur locality. Contemporary news reports describe it as a pocket of Kondapur, with connections towards HITEC City, Madhapur and other employment centres in western Hyderabad.

The locality is served by roads connecting Kondapur and HITEC City. A road connecting the Tech Mahindra area with the Botanical Garden road passes through Whitefields.

== Development ==
Whitefields developed as part of the expansion of western Hyderabad associated with the growth of the city's information-technology and services sector. By the late 2010s, it had become a residential area associated with employees working in the surrounding technology corridor.

Residential and commercial development has continued in the area. In 2018, a residential project was being developed in Whitefields, Kondapur, during a period of rapid growth in Hyderabad's housing market.

The locality has also acquired commercial establishments serving residents and workers in the surrounding IT corridor. In 2023, The New Indian Express reported the opening of a café at Whitefields, Kondapur, describing the area as the location of the establishment's second Hyderabad outlet. Anjaiah Nagar sits right next to Whitefields and acts as a major, high-density hub for paying guest (PG) accommodations, hostels, and local eateries.

Notable high-end complexes along White Field Road include Trendset Rythme, Vasavi's Shanthinikethan, and Aditya Heights.

== Gallery ==
View of white field road, Kondapur, Hyderabad

View of white field road, Kondapur, Hyderabad

== Infrastructure ==
The rapid development of Whitefields has also been accompanied by civic-infrastructure challenges. In 2009, The Times of India reported that Whitefields, Kondapur lacked an underground sewerage system, with some developments relying on septic tanks or sewage-treatment facilities.

Power-supply interruptions have also affected the locality. In January 2018, Whitefields was among the areas of western Hyderabad affected by lengthy power outages during maintenance work at the Kothaguda substation.

Water availability has periodically been an issue for residential developments. In January 2024, Deccan Chronicle reported that a gated community in Whitefields, Kondapur was among residential developments in Hyderabad that had begun ordering water tankers during a period of increased summer demand.

In March 2023, road construction in Whitefields attracted attention after a newly laid cement-concrete road connecting the Tech Mahindra area with the Botanical Garden road was reported to have been constructed substantially above the surrounding ground level. The Greater Hyderabad Municipal Corporation subsequently inspected the work and directed remedial measures.
