= Serilingampally Assembly constituency =

Constituency of the Telangana legislative assembly in India

Coordinates: 17.48°N 78.32°E

Serilingampally
- Constituency No. 52 for the Telangana Legislative Assembly
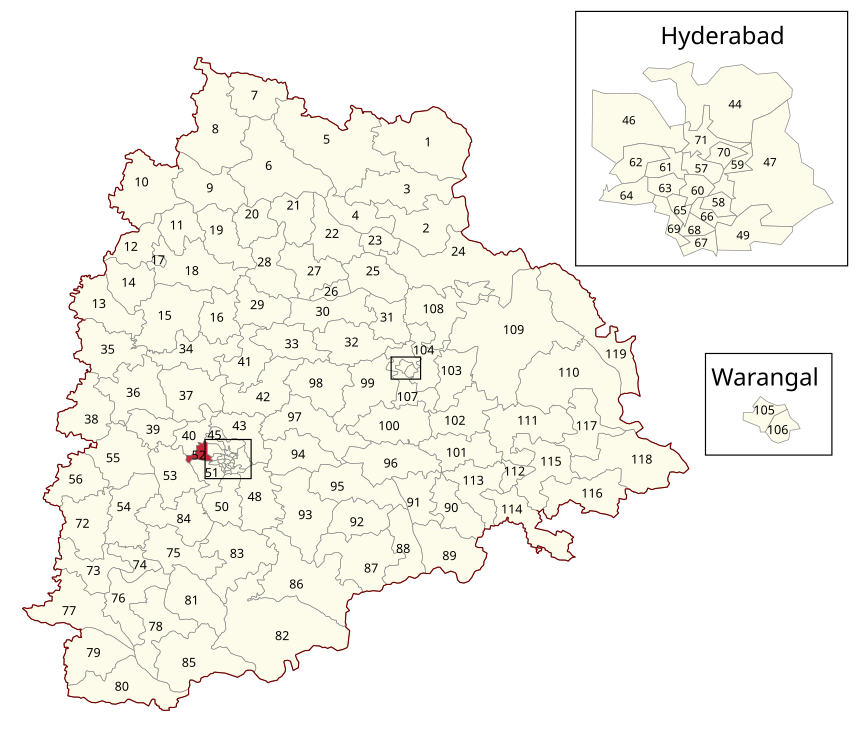
- Location of Serilingampally Assembly constituency within Telangana

Constituency details
- Country: India
- Region: South India
- State: Telangana
- District: Ranga Reddy
- Lok Sabha constituency: Chevella
- Established: 2008
- Total electors: 7,32,506
- Reservation: None

Member of Legislative Assembly
- 3rd Telangana Legislative Assembly
- Incumbent Arekapudi Gandhi
- Party: INC
- Elected year: 2023

Serilingampally Assembly constituency is an Assembly legislative constituency of Telangana. It is one of 14 constituencies in Ranga Reddy district. It is part of Chevella Lok Sabha constituency. It is also one of the 26 constituencies of CURE limits, a strategic zone created by Government of Telangana. Serilingampally constituency is the largest assembly constituency numerically with 7,32,506 voters.

Arekapudi Gandhi of Indian National Congress is currently representing the constituency.

== Overview ==
It is a newly formed constituency, created just before the 2009 general election; as per Delimitation Act of 2002, it was formed from part of the Khairatabad Constituency. Areas like Madhapur, Gachibowli, Kondapur, Miyapur come under Serilingampally (Assembly constituency).

The Assembly Constituency presently comprises the following Mandals

Mandal/Ward	Districts
Serilingampally	Ranga Reddy
Miyapur	Ranga Reddy
Gachibowli	Ranga Reddy
Madhapur	Ranga Reddy
Chanda Nagar	Ranga Reddy
Balanagar (Part)	Medchal-Malkajgiri
Kukatpally (M) (Part)	Medchal-Malkajgiri
Kukatpally (M) - Ward No. 1 to 4.	Medchal-Malkajgiri
Vivekananda Nagar Colony	Hyderabad
BHEL Township, Hyderabad	Sangareddy
Allwyn Colony	Medchal-Malkajgiri
Kondapur	Ranga Reddy
Hafeezpet	Hyderabad

The Delimitation of Parliamentary and Assembly Constituencies Order, 2008 by Election Commission of India

== Members of Legislative Assembly ==
Duration	Member	Political party
Andhra Pradesh
2009	M. Bikshapathi Yadav	Indian National Congress
Telangana
2014	Arekapudi Gandhi	Telugu Desam Party
2018	Arekapudi Gandhi	Telangana Rashtra Samithi
2023	Arekapudi Gandhi	Bharat Rashtra Samithi

== Election results ==
=== 2023 ===
2023 Telangana Legislative Assembly election: Serilingampally
Party	Candidate	Votes	%	±%
BRS	Arekapudi Gandhi	157,332	43.97	▼7.25
INC	Jagadeeswar Goud	110,780	30.96	
BJP	M. Ravi Kumar Yadav	80,148	22.40	▲14.50
NOTA	None of the Above	3,145	0.88	▼0.42
BSP	O. Srinivas Yadav	1,120	0.31	
IND	18 Independent Candidates	4,259	1.20	
OTH	9 Other Party Candidates	1,046	0.30	
Majority		46,552	13.01	▼2.82
Turnout		357,830	48.85	▲0.24
BRS hold		Swing		

=== 2018 ===
2018 Telangana Legislative Assembly election: Serilingampally
Party	Candidate	Votes	%	±%
TRS	Arekapudi Gandhi	143,307	51.22	▲32.30
TDP	V. Ananda Prasad	99,012	35.39	▼10.48
BJP	Gajjala Yoganand	22,106	7.90	
NOTA	None of the Above	3,637	1.30	▲0.57
IND	15 Independent Candidates	7,126	2.54	
OTH	11 Other Party Candidates	4,617	1.67	
Majority		44,295	15.83	▼11.12
Turnout		279,805	48.61	▲0.76
TRS gain from TDP		Swing		

=== 2014 ===
2014 Telangana Legislative Assembly election: Serilingampally
Party	Candidate	Votes	%	±%
TDP	Arekapudi Gandhi	129,796	45.87	▲16.41
TRS	Komaragoni Shanker Goud	53,539	18.92	
INC	M. Bhikshapathi Yadav	43,384	15.33	▼14.78
YSRCP	Mukka Rupananda Reddy	24,410	8.63	
AIMIM	Nazeer Khan	11,100	3.92	
LSP	Gorthi Srinivas	9,478	3.35	▼10.12
AAP	Matta Suresh Kumar	3,102	1.10	
NOTA	None of the Above	2,054	0.73	
IND	8 Independent Candidates	2,610	0.94	
OTH	6 Other Party Candidates	3,471	1.23	
Majority		76,257	26.95	▲26.30
Turnout		282,944	47.85	
TDP gain from INC		Swing		

=== 2009 ===
2009 Andhra Pradesh Legislative Assembly election: Serilingampally
Party	Candidate	Votes	%	±%
INC	M. Bikshapathi Yadav	61,135	30.11	
TDP	Movva Satyanarayana	59,808	29.46	
PRP	Bandi Ramesh	30,226	14.89	
LSP	Katari Srinivasa Rao	27,343	13.47	
BJP	M. Bheem Rao	9,322	4.59	
IND	P. Vijaya	7,857	3.87	
BSP	Abdul Mujeeb Zakir	1,303	0.64	
IND	8 Independent Candidates	3,824	1.88	
OTH	3 Other Party Candidates	2,191	1.08	
Majority		1,327	0.65	
Turnout		203,009		
INC win (new seat)				

== See also ==
- Serilingampally
- List of constituencies of Telangana Legislative Assembly
