= Kondapur =

Suburb in western Hyderabad, Telangana

- Suburb
- Location in Telangana, India Kondapur (Telangana) Kondapur (India)
- Coordinates: 17°28′N 78°22′E
- Country: India
- State: Telangana
- District: Ranga Reddy
- City: Hyderabad

Government
  - Type: municipality
  - Body: GHMC

Languages
  - Official: Telugu
- Time zone: UTC+5:30 (IST)
- PIN: 500084
- Vehicle registration: TG
- Lok Sabha constituency: Chevella
- Assembly constituency: Serilingampally
- Planning agency: Hyderabad Metropolitan Development Authority

Kondapur is a suburb in western part of Hyderabad, Telangana, India. Kondapur has become a preferred residential area for IT professionals due to its connectivity to HITEC City and Gachibowli. It falls under Serilingampally mandal of Ranga Reddy district. The locality has emerged as a prominent commercial and residential hub, owing to its close proximity to IT corridor of Hyderabad. It is administered as Ward No. 234 of Greater Hyderabad Municipal Corporation.

== Etymology ==
Kondapur is a portmanteau of two Telugu words: konda and pur, translating to "hill settlement".

== Economy ==
Kondapur is located in the Cyberabad information technology zone and in the last decade it has rapidly grown into a modern business hub. Google Hyderabad is in Kondapur. The region had a real estate and commercial zone expansion in last two decades (1996 - 2010). A subsequent over-supply of housing has led to a real estate price stagnation during the years 2010 to 2013, which however did recover from the year 2014. The ground-water is quite sufficient all through the year for the people staying in apartments, though the purchase of municipality water is required during certain summer seasons.

Residential aspects: Kondapur has access to many supermarkets such as Ratnadeep, Heritage Fresh etc. private and government schools and medical facilities notably Kims hospitals and Apollo Cradle. The nearest sport facilities are available in Gachibowli Sport arena. There are good establishments for marriages and seminars in the HITEC City area nearby. Most of the people in the apartments rented, are software professionals working in the nearby adjacent IT hub.

The well-connected bus services of TSRTC offer multiple travel routes. 127k - from Kondapur to Koti, 10H - from Kondapur to Secunderabad, 47k - from Secunderabad to Kondapur, 222 -from Patancheru via Kondapur to Koti. The International airport is approximately 30 kilometers, accessed through the outer ring road with bus (airport service) and taxis. The nearest Hyderabad MMTS connection is available from Hafeezpet and the Hyderabad metro line connection would be available from HITEC City metro station. A three-kilometre multi-level unidirectional flyover crossing Kothaguda, Kondapur Junctions and Botanical Garden, is likely to be inaugurated by October 2022. The flyover splits into two, each with three lanes. While one part of the flyover goes towards Kondapur Junction and ends at Raghavendra Colony C Block arch, the other part heads towards HITEC City. In addition to this flyover, a 470-metre long and 11-metre wide uni-directional underpass is being built near Kothaguda Junction. The underpass starts near Harsha Toyota, Kondapur and runs up to Sarath City Capital Mall.

The commercial centres of Kondapur center, Madhapur, Kothaguda, and Hitech City are diverse. All the major banking facilities are available, along with a choice of restaurants and street food outlets. All major showrooms related to automobiles are available here, major brands being Toyota, Mahindra, Hyundai, Honda and Maruti. Harsha Toyota, for example, is the largest seller of Toyota Innova vehicles in the city of Hyderabad. The cultural center of Shilparamam is 2 km away and the botanical garden/reserve forest of Kondapur is a rare patch of greenery in the concrete maze of Hyderabad.

Whitefields is a prominent residential neighborhood which is located between Hitech City and Kondapur. several IT professionals working in Gachibowli, Hitech City, Madhapur, and Kondapur live in Whitefields.

== Other details ==
The pin code of Kondapur, K.V.Rangareddy, Telangana is 500084. The post office Kondapur is located in the district K.V.Rangareddy, Telangana. The first two digits of the pin code denotes 50, which is listed in Telangana.

WorldOne International School is also situated there.
