= Arekapudi Gandhi =

Indian politician

Member of Telangana Legislative Assembly
- Incumbent
- Assumed office 2 June 2014
- Preceded by: M. Bikshapathi Yadav
- Constituency: Serilingampally

Personal details
- Party: Indian National Congress (2024-present)
- Other political affiliations: Telugu Desam Party (2016); Bharat Rashtra Samithi (2016-2024)
- Occupation: Politician

Arekapudi Gandhi (born 12 June 1961) is a member of the Telangana Legislative Assembly from Serilingampally Assembly constituency since the 2014 Legislative Assembly election. He won as a Member of the Legislative Assembly representing Telugu Desam Party in the 2014 Legislative Assembly election and later joined Bharat Rashtra Samithi.

He served as whip in the 2nd Telangana Assembly. He defected to Congress on 13 July 2024 and was appointed Public Accounts Committee (PAC) Chairman on 9 September 2024.
