= Rachelia glaria =

Scientific classification
- Kingdom: Plantae
- Clade: Tracheophytes
- Clade: Angiosperms
- Clade: Eudicots
- Clade: Asterids
- Order: Asterales
- Family: Asteraceae
- Subfamily: Asteroideae
- Tribe: Gnaphalieae
- Genus: Rachelia; J.M.Ward & Breitw.
- Species: R. glaria

Binomial name
- Rachelia glaria J.M.Ward & Breitw.

Species of flowering plant

Rachelia is a monotypic genus of flowering plants belonging to the family Asteraceae. It just contains one species, Rachelia glaria J.M.Ward & Breitw. It is in the tribe Gnaphalieae.

== Description ==
It is a tufted, silver-grey looking perennial herb with widely spaced bundles of 1-10 upright shoots, which are 10-30 mm tall and 10 mm in diameter. They are produced from long, slender, branched (underground) rhizomes. The aerial stems are sparingly and shortly branched or sometimes unbranched and entirely obscured by leaves. The leaves are imbricate (overlapping), with the leaf base clasping the stem and with the lamina (the blade of a leaf) spreading at an angle of about 45 degrees. They are broadly obovate-spathulate (oval to spoon shaped), 6.9–9.7 mm (0–0 in) long by 4.6–8.5 mm (0–0 in) wide, with densely lanate (dense woolly hairs) all over both surfaces. The lamina is 4.2–6.5 mm (0–0 in) long, widest in upper third and slightly folded along midrib. The apex of the leaf is truncate (cut off squarely), the leaf hairs are loosely appressed, ascending, matted and crinkled at the free ends. The base of the leaf, is 2.5–4.4 mm (0–0 in) long, widest in upper third, frequently pink-tinged, with 3 strong veins. The capitula (dense clusters of flowers) around 2-9 per stem, with one being terminal and associated with 2 leaves, the others are usually sessile in the axils (junction points) of the upper leaves, rarely terminal on very short axillary shoots with no stem elongation and with 2 small leaves. The capitula cluster, including leaves, is 15 mm in diameter. The capitulum is 7.7–9.0 mm (0–0 in) long by 1.7–3.0 mm (0–0 in) wide. The 14-15 involucral bracts are the outermost bracts, they are 5-7 mm long by 2.6 mm wide including the margins. The innermost bracts are narrowly rhombic (like a rhombus: an oblique figure with four equal sides), they are 7.1–7.6 mm (0–0 in) long by 2.2 mm (0 in) wide also including the margins. The lamina are 3.3 mm long by 1.0 mm wide, pale brown near to the base and bright brown above. The apex is acute and the margins are broad and hyaline (translucent). The stereome (rigid cellular tissue) is 3.8-4.7 mm long, pale green, not fenestrated (having translucent areas) with the vein extending into lamina. The receptacle is 0.5-1.0 mm in diameter, high and rounded with florets attached to the sides as well as the top. The 7-11 florets are all female and some of the hermaphrodite florets are arranged in a ring and surrounding the remaining hermaphrodite florets. The 3-5 female florets have a corolla that is 4.2 mm long and has red below lobes, otherwise is translucent pale green. The tube is 0.15 mm wide, broadening to 0.3 mm at the base. The 3-6 hermaphrodite florets have a corolla that is 4.6 mm long, broadening only slightly above and red below lobes. The tube is 0.4 mm wide with lobes that are 0.6 mm long, translucent pale green with a small variable amount of red pigment. They are not spreading with margins that are papillose (have a small, elongated protuberance on the surface), the veins sometime extend to the tip, but are variable in a single floret. The biseriate capitate (arranged in two rows) hairs on lobes and a few on upper part of tube, a few simple long-tailed hairs are on the lobes. The anthers are far exserted from corolla. The apical anther has a flat appendage which is tapering. The anther tails are far exceeding the filament collar. The mature cypsela is 1.5–1.9 mm (0–0 in) long by 0.8 mm (0 in) wide. It is ridged and reddish or brown in colour as well as papillate. The pappus hairs are 5.3-5.6 mm long and the shaft is 40-55 mm wide. The flowering period, is between December and January. It then fruits (produces seed capsules) between February and March.

=== Biochemistry ===
It has a chromosome no. = 2n=28.

== Taxonomy ==
The genus name of Rachelia is in honour of Rachel Chisholm, born Kevern (1915–2017), New Zealand farmer from Molesworth Station. The Latin specific epithet of glaria refers to the habitat (of the plant) and it is derived from the stem of "glara", meaning "scree", and the suffix "-ia", meaning "characteristic of' or "belonging to". Both the genus and the sole species were first described and published in New Zealand J. Bot. Vol.35 on page 146 in 1997.

The genus is thought to be a possible synonym of Cassinia R. Br. by the United States Department of Agriculture and the Agricultural Research Service, and they do not list any known species.

== Distribution and habitat ==
It is native to New Zealand. It grows in alpine habitats, on dry, shingly, non-glaciated mountains, where it appears to be confined to fine argillite lenses within the mobile scree. It grows at altitudes of 1,500–1,570 metres (4,920–5,150 ft) above sea level.

In 2018, they were declared 'At Risk' as they were naturally uncommon in the wild. They are normally damaged by plant collectors or by animals, when walked on.

== Other sources ==
- Mabberley, D.J. 2008: Mabberley's plant book, a portable dictionary of plants, their classification and uses. Edition 3. Cambridge University Press.
