= HITEC City =

Business district in Hyderabad, India

HITEC City Cyberabad
- Suburb
- HITEC City
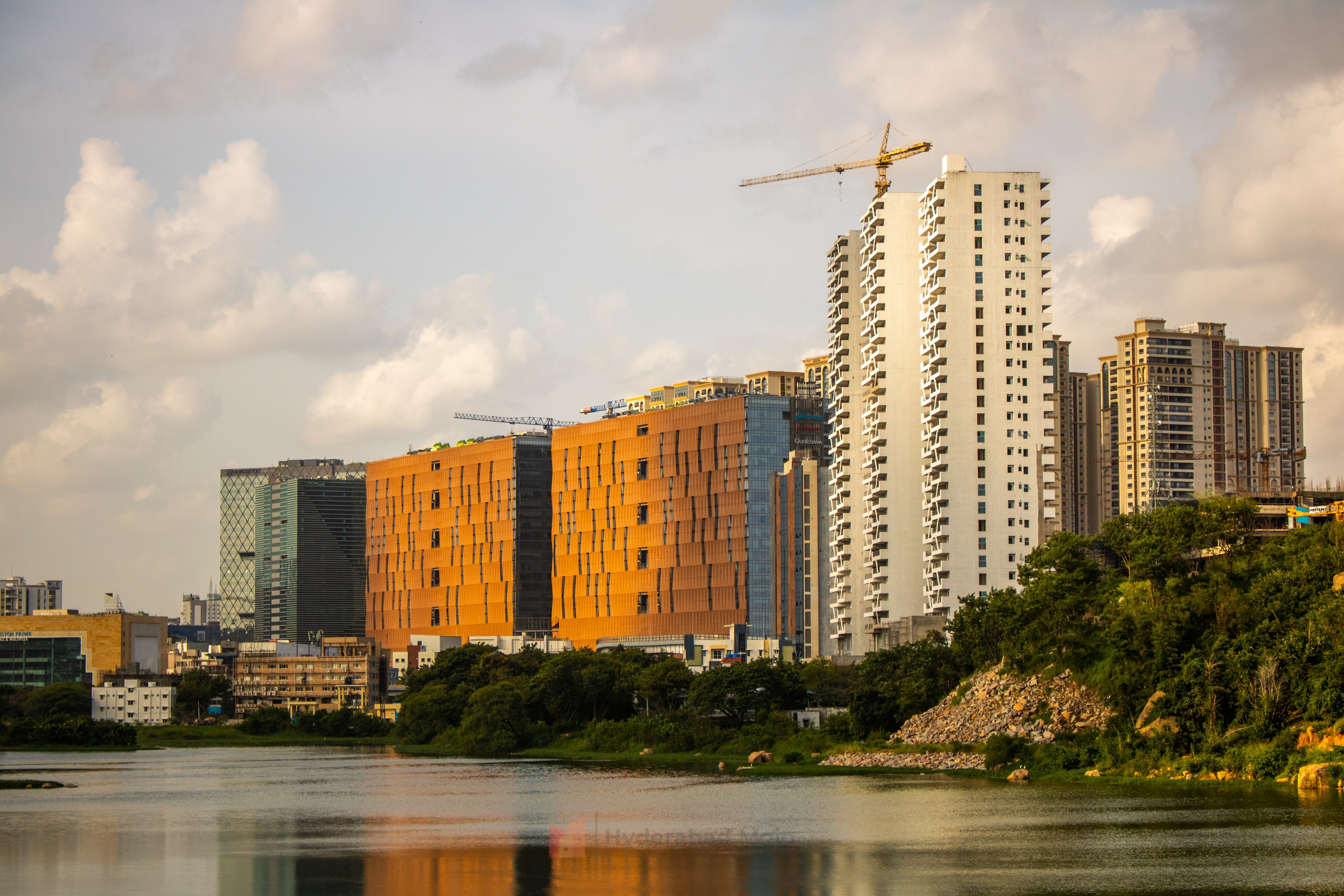
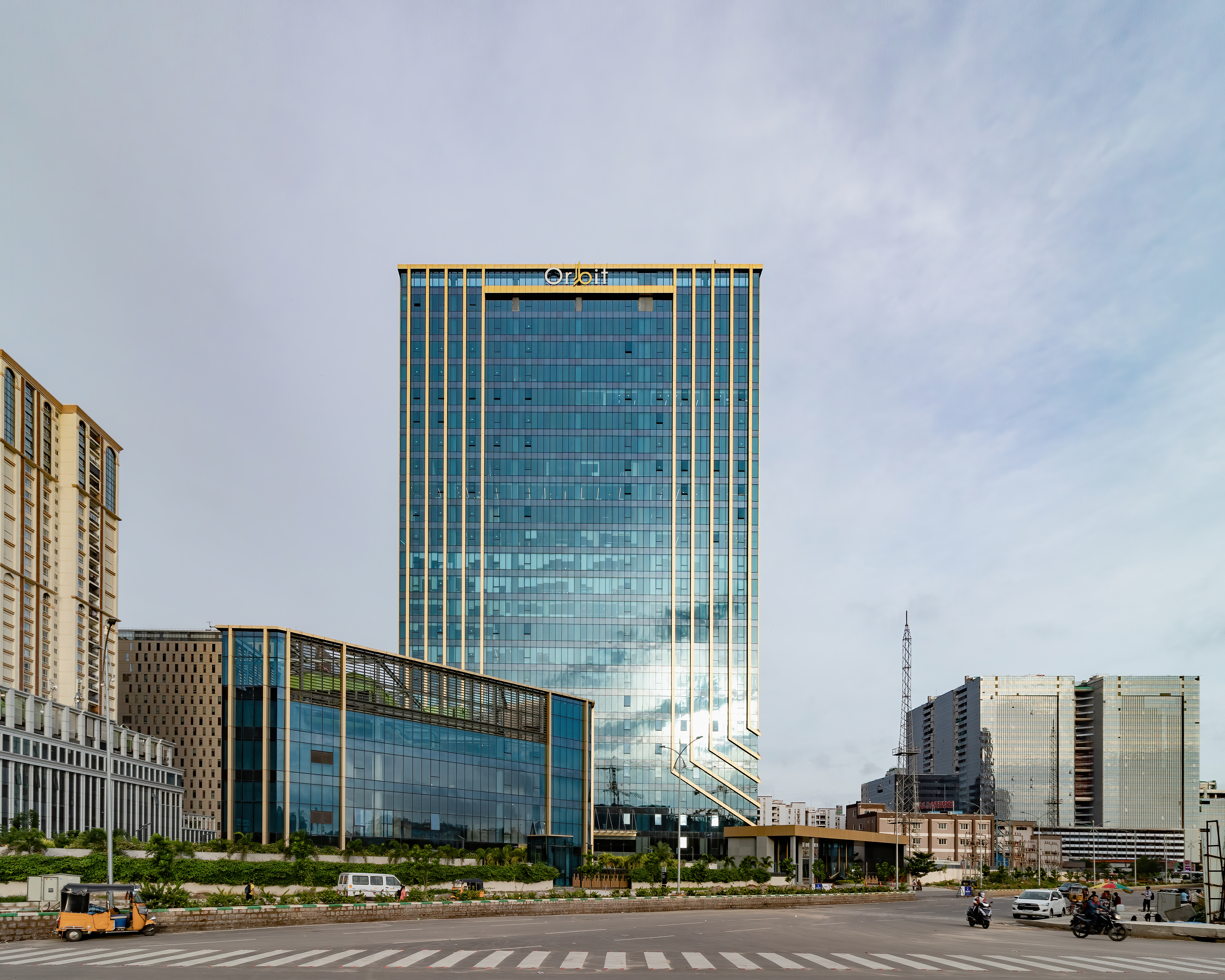
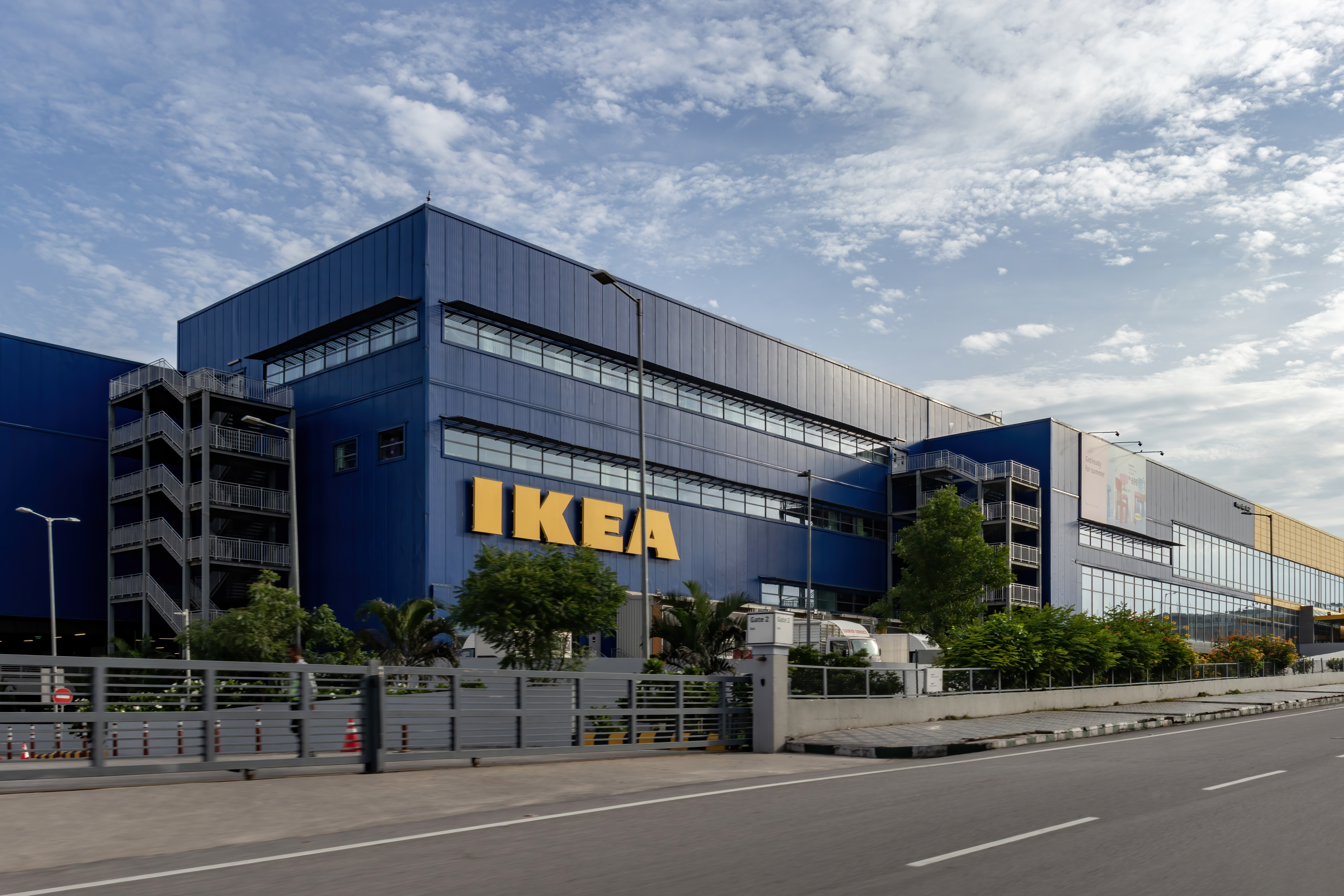
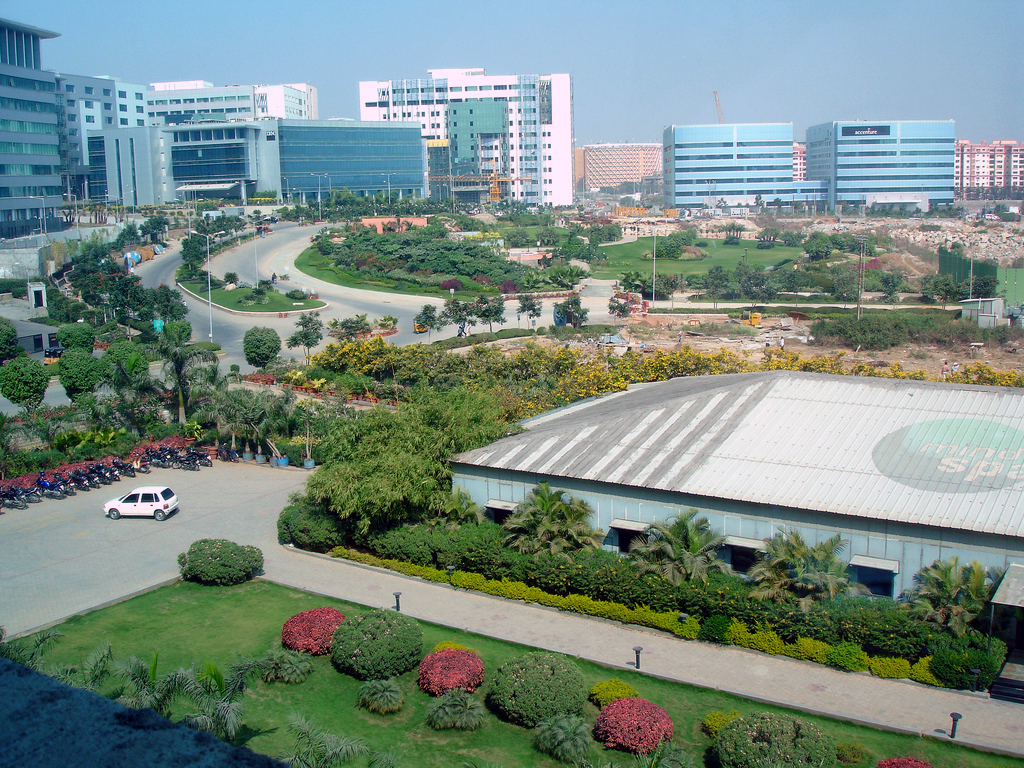
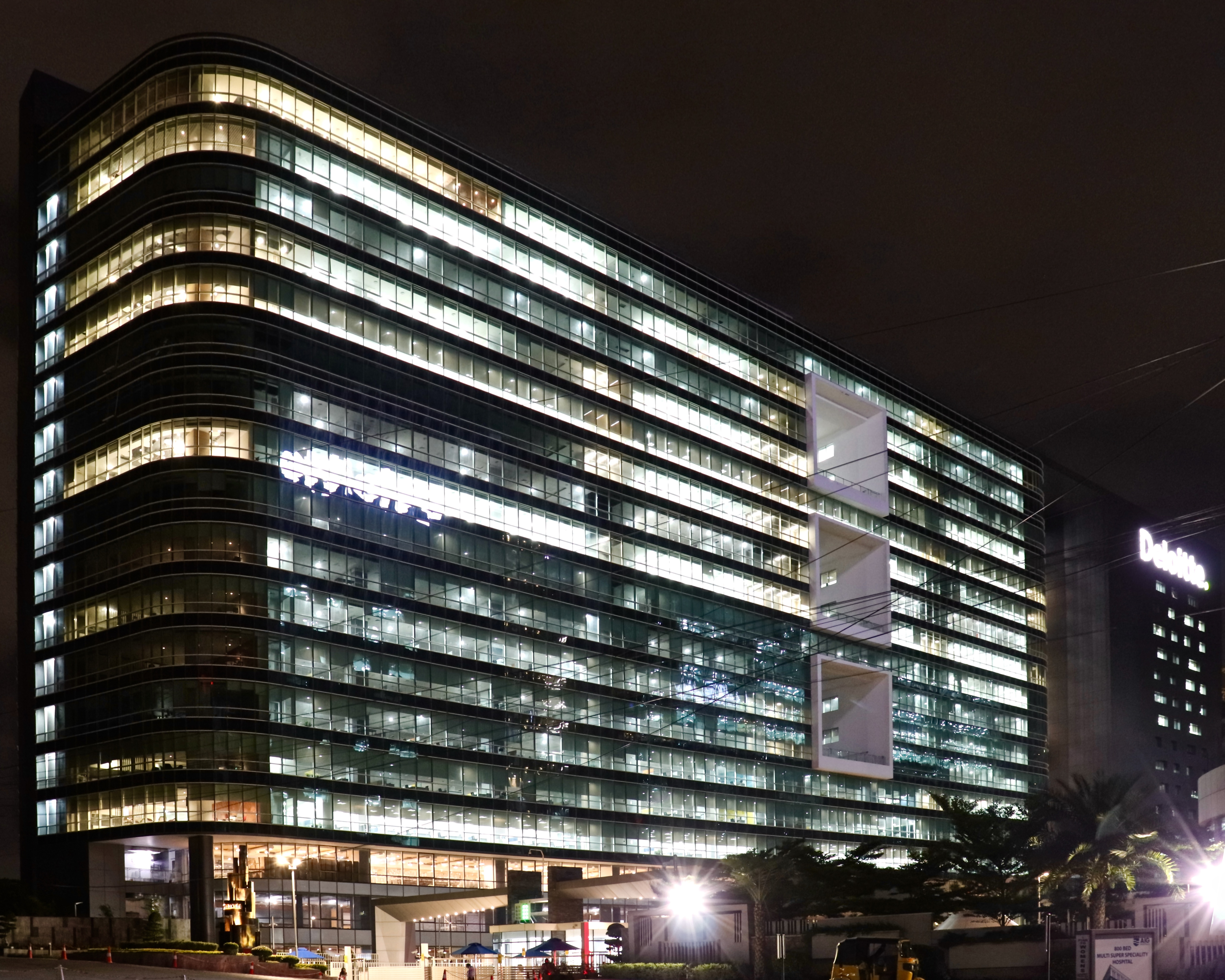
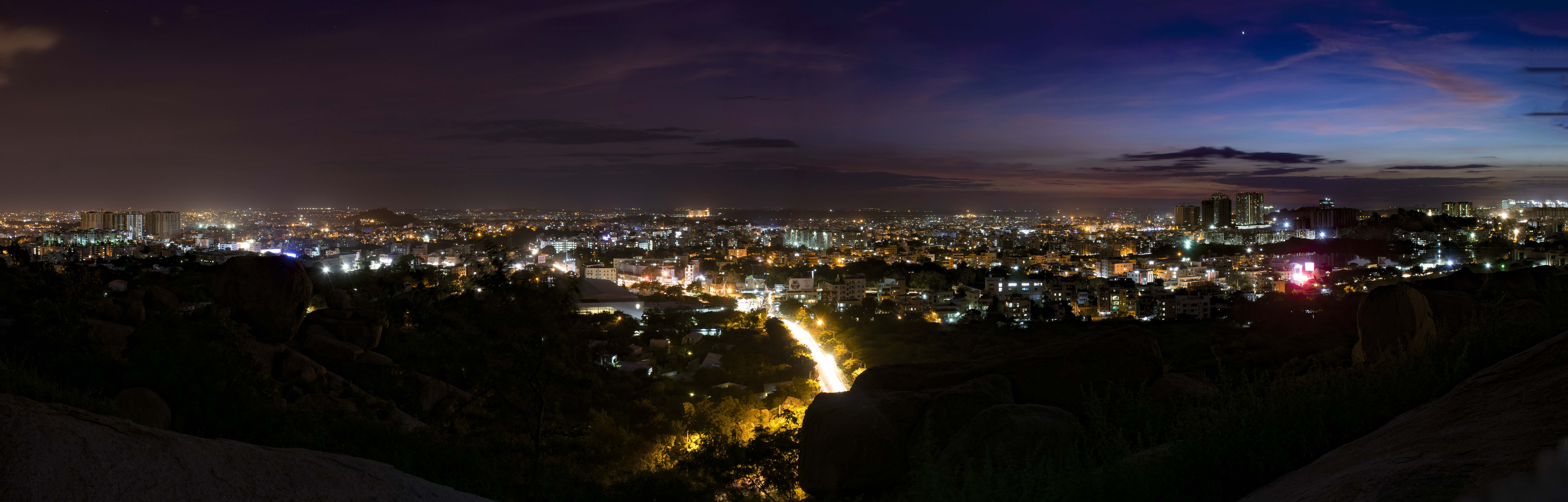
- View of Cyberabad

- Location in Hyderabad, India HITEC City (India)
- Coordinates: 17.44155°N 78.38264°E
- Country: India
- State: Telangana
- District: Ranga Reddy
- Established: 22 November 1998; 27 years ago
- Founder: N. Chandrababu Naidu

Government
  - Key People: D. Sridhar Babu (IT Ministry of State); Avinash Mohanty (Commissioner of Cyberabad)

Area
  - Total: 680 km^{2} (260 sq mi)

Population (2019)
  - Total: est. 29 lakh
- Time zone: UTC+5:30 (IST)
- Website: Cyberabad Metropolitan Commissionerate

The Hyderabad Information Technology and Engineering Consultancy City (HITEC City) is an Indian financial business district located in Hyderabad, Telangana, India. HITEC City is spread across 81 ha (200 acres) of land under the suburbs of Madhapur, Gachibowli, Kondapur, Miyapur, Nanakramguda, Serilingampally, Bachupally, Manikonda, Kukatpally and Shamshabad all the combined technology townships is also known as Cyberabad. HITEC City is within 2 kilometres (1.2 mi) of the residential and commercial suburb of Jubilee Hills.

== History ==
In 1997, the then Chief Minister N. Chandrababu Naidu travelled to Southeast Asia to meet potential investors and 'market the state' and was impressed with the larger technology related developments of Singapore and Malaysia – especially Multimedia Super Corridor (MSC) near Kuala Lumpur. Soon after coming back from his Southeast Asia tour, Naidu initiated a $350 million knowledge enclave in Hyderabad, leading to birth of HITEC City. It was inaugurated by the then Prime Minister of India Atal Bihari Vajpayee on 22 November 1998.

== Cityscape ==
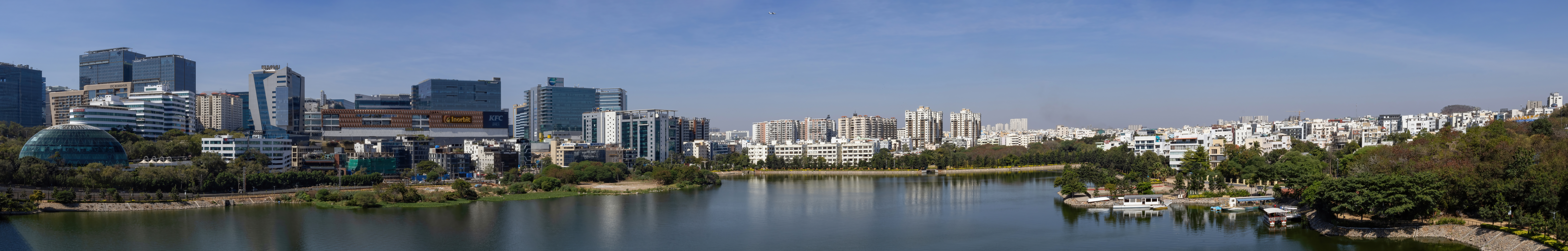
Hitech city and Madhapur from Durgam Cheruvu bridge

== Foundation of HITEC City ==
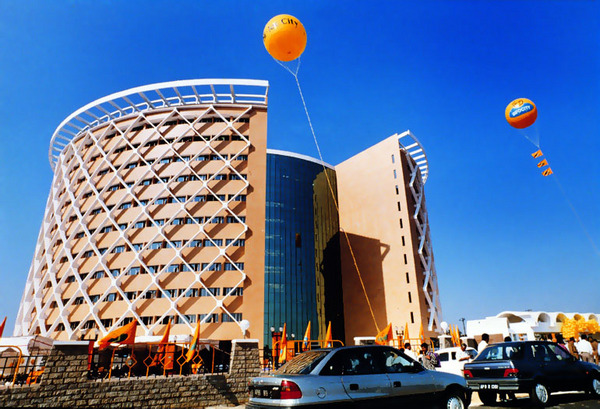
Cyber Towers, HITEC City Hyderabad

Cyber Towers was the first tower to be built for the promotion of Information Technology (IT). Within the span of 14 months, the unique design was selected by N. Chandrababu Naidu in 1997. The Cyberabad Metropolitan Police was set up for policing. It was initially marketed by both the officials of APIIC and L&T Infocity Ltd (the public and private sector partner). The Cyber Towers building is divided into four quadrants with a large fountain in the middle of the quadrants. Another large building of office space named Cyber Gateway has been built comprises over 866,000 square feet (80,500 square meters) across 8 acres (3.25 ha). HITEC City is now home to several of the tallest buildings in Hyderabad.

== Key campuses ==
=== Laxmi Cyber City ===
Laxmi Cyber City, started construction from 2005 and built span of two years by 2007 operations started. It consists of three blocks. The property has an area of 1 million sq. ft.

=== R & D center ===
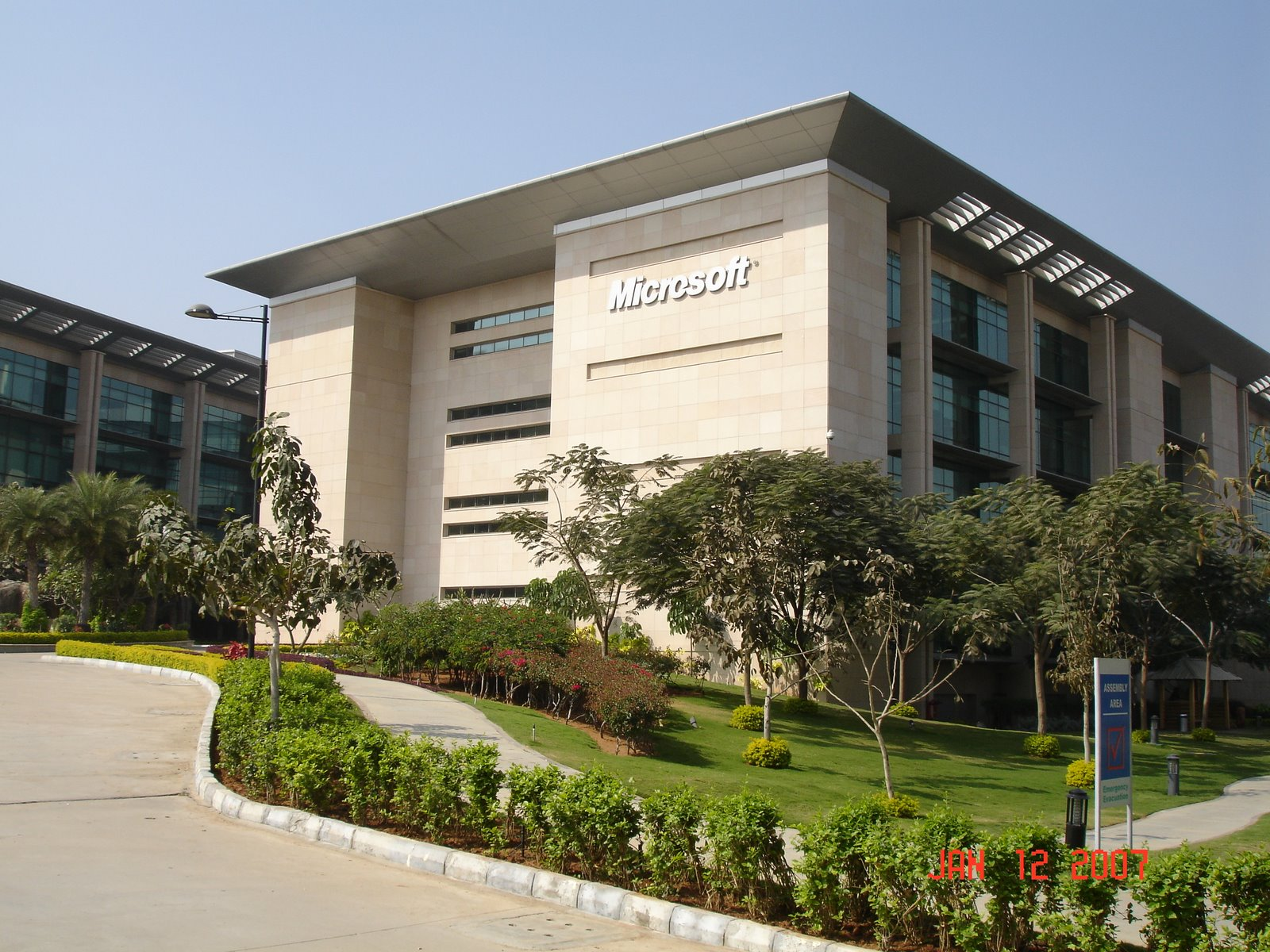
Microsoft R&D Hyderabad

Microsoft India Development Center was set up in Hyderabad in 1998 and is one of Microsoft's largest R&D centers outside its headquarters in Redmond, Washington. Then Chief minister N. Chandrababu Naidu arranged a meeting with Bill Gates, founder of Microsoft, to establish the company's development centre in Hyderabad. The 54 acres Microsoft campus has LEED Gold Certification for one of its buildings. The Microsoft Corporation is the first multinational company to build a research and development center in Cyberabad.

=== L&T Infocity ===
Infocity is the first software technology park layout in HITEC City.

=== CII - Sohrabji Godrej Green Business Centre ===
CII-Sohrabji Godrej Green Business Centre (CII-Godrej GBC) was established in the year 2004, as CII's Developmental Institute on Green Practices & Businesses, aimed at offering advisory services on conservation of natural resources. The Green Business Centre was inaugurated by His Excellency Dr. A. P. J. Abdul Kalam, the then President of India on 14 July 2004.

The Services of Green Business Centre include energy management, green buildings, green companies, renewable energy, GHG inventorisation, green product certification, waste management, and cleaner production process.

== Hyderabad International Convention Centre ==
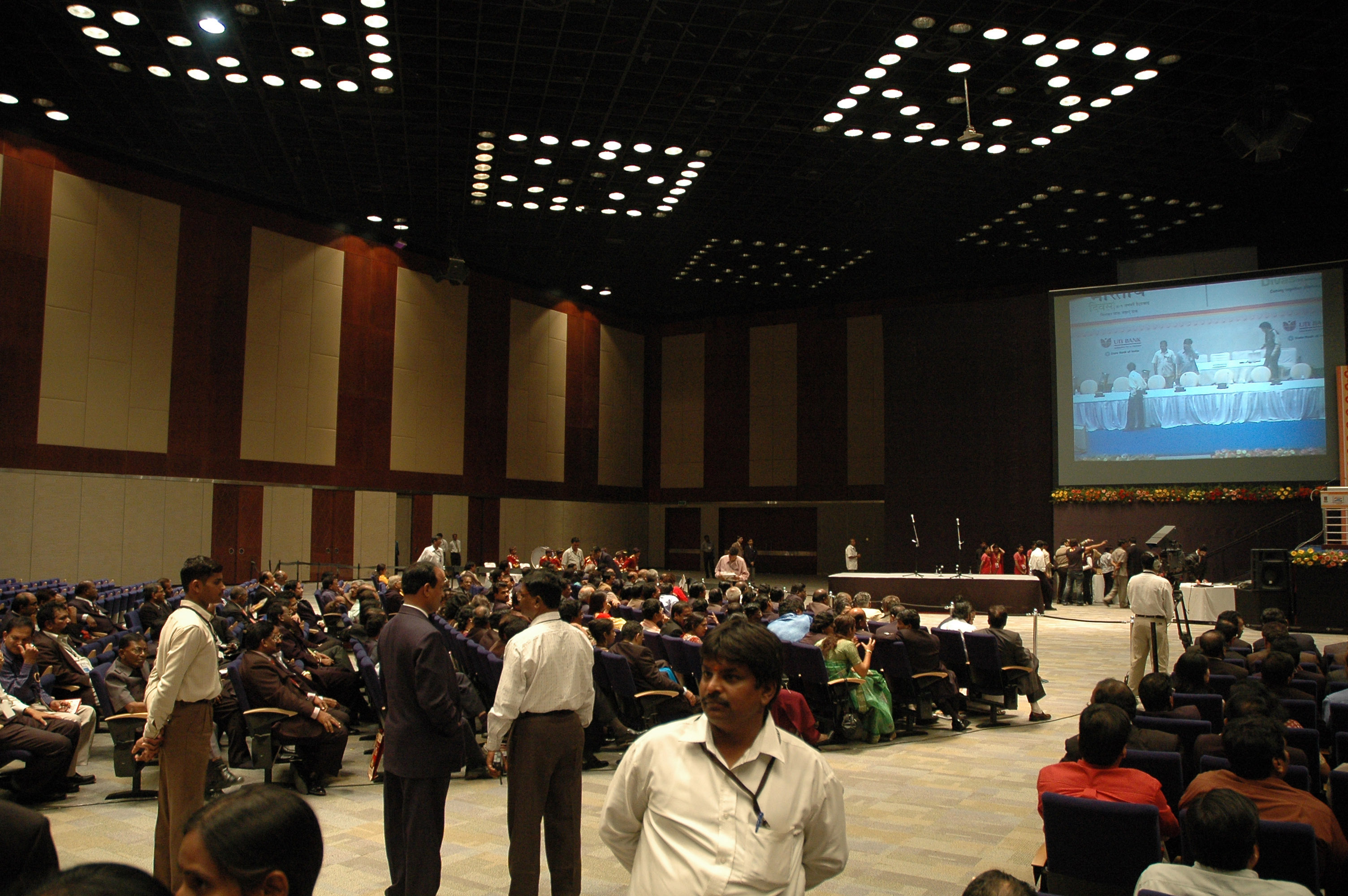
Hyderabad International Convention Centre

In process of making India's favorite meetings and events destination in Hyderabad, then chief minister N. Chandrababu Naidu created a convention hub with the Hyderabad International Convention Centre, is a purpose-built, state-of-the-art convention facility, the first of its kind in South Asia. The convention centre was built by Emaar MGF of India. It has been the winner of the excellence award for “Best Standalone Convention Centre” for a record four times, nationally awarded by Ministry of Tourism, Government of India and the company is part owned by Emaar of UAE. The facility is managed by Accor Hospitality. The Hyderabad International Convention Centre with 5,000 seating capacity is India's largest convention facility. It is an integrated 27,000-square-metre (290,000 sq ft) covering 6.1 ha (15 acres). The centre can be configured to increase seating capacity to about 6,500. The convention center is connected to Novotel Hyderabad, an international business hotel, it has 288 rooms and is equipped with meeting rooms, restaurants, business centre, spa and a health club.

== Raheja Mindspace IT Park ==
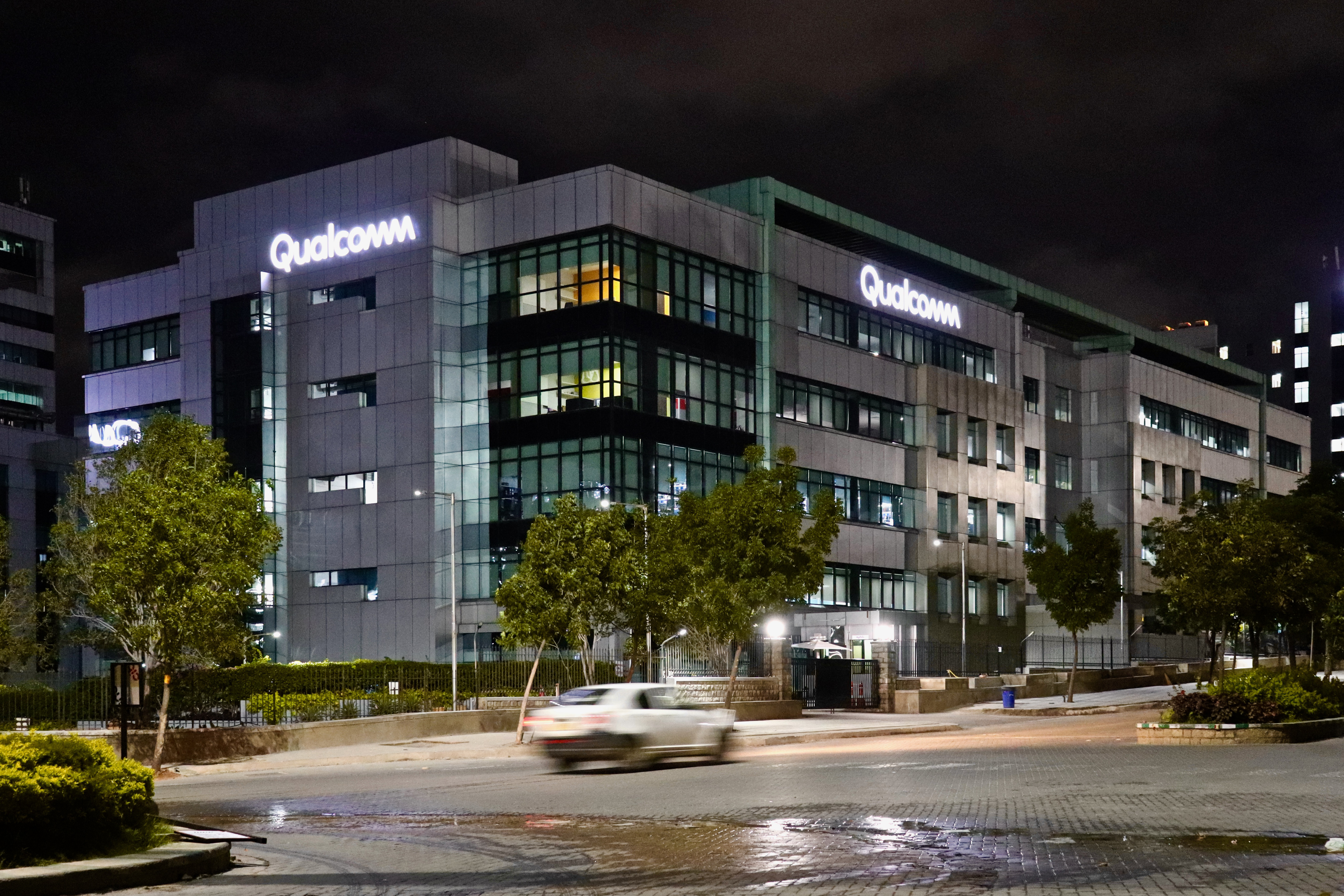
An office building in Mindspace IT Park, Hyderabad

The Mindspace IT Park, is a park that includes residential, recreational, entertainment, and retail spaces. The park provides about 370,000 square metres (4,000,000 sq ft) of office space. Spread across 45 hectares (110 acres), this layout also provides about 40% open space with telecommunications and civic infrastructure, wide roads and greenery. The district witnessed immediate success with over 93 thousand square metres (1 million square feet) built and occupied within just 14 months of starting the project. The park provides both multi-tenant and built to suit facilities. Companies such as Hyundai Mobis, IBM, Accenture, CSC, Bank of America, Facebook and Novartis have built to suit facilities in the park with 10000 workers within them. Other companies in multitenant facilities include Broadcom Inc., Deloitte, Parexel, Syneos Health, Qualcomm, Zensar Technologies Ltd, Tech Mahindra, Oracle, Accenture, Amazon, General Electric, OpenText, IGATE, Verizon, Thomson Reuters, Wells Fargo and TietoEVRY. As of 2008 March, 20,000 people work in the park. The park is a notified SEZ and is set to accommodate about 55,000 IT workers making it the largest of the IT parks in HITEC city. The park also has a Westin Hotel and Inorbit Mall which have been opened in the second half of 2009.

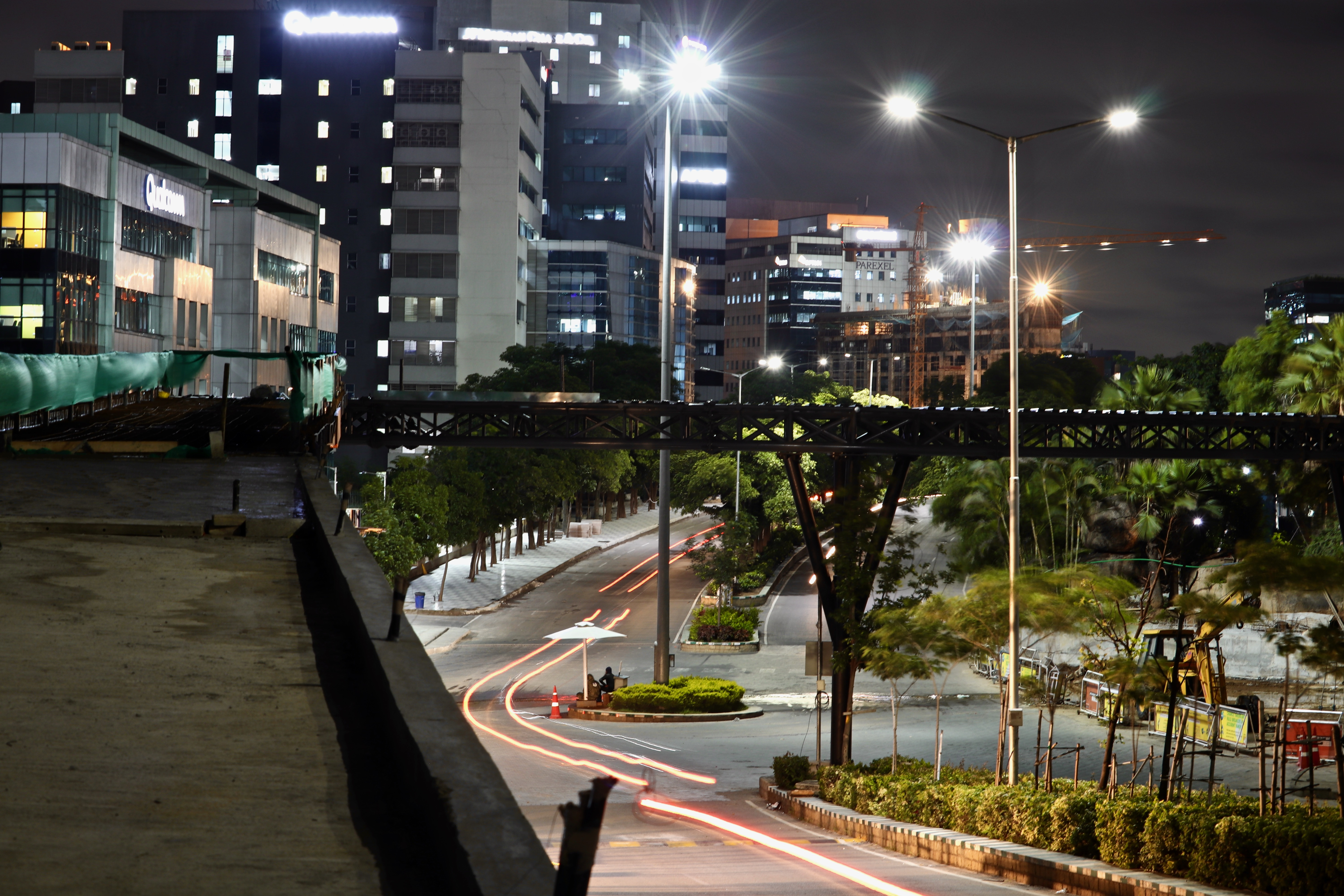
Mindspace IT Park, hyderabad

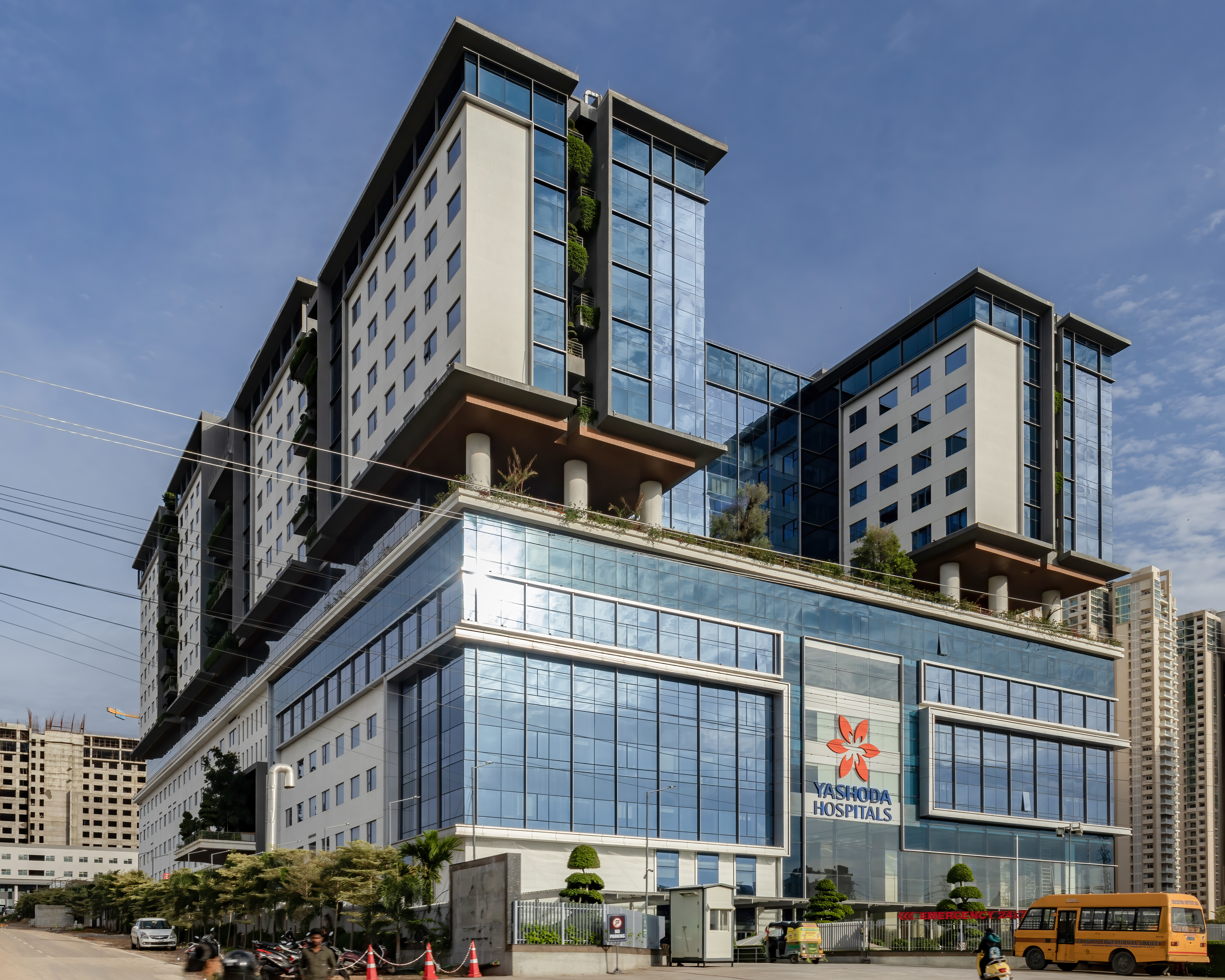
Yashoda Hospitals, HITEC City

Map of Mindspace Park

- Building - 1 - Accenture.
- Building - 2 -Tech Mahindra, GE, ZenQ, Patni Computer Systems, Bank of America, Sumtotal systems, Redpine Signals, Beryl Consulting
- Building - 3 - IBM.
- Building - 4 - Computer Sciences Corporation.
- Building - 5 - Bank of America, Redpine Signals.
- Building - 6 - Qualcomm.
- Building - 7 - Computer Sciences Corporation.
- Building - 8 - Qualcomm, PL Engineering, Deloitte, UTC Fire & Security
- Building - 9 - Verizon, Amazon, Broadcom, Qualcomm, HSBC, Deloitte, PerkinElmer.
- Building - 10 - Verizon, Qualcomm, Broadcom, Raheja India.
- Building - 11 - JP Morgan, Thomson Reuters, Advanced Micro Devices.
- Building - 12A - Cognizant Technology Solutions, Pegasystems Inc.
- Building - 14 - Portware, United Health Group, Persistent Systems & Solutions Ltd, OpenText Corporation, LGS Global Ltd, Trianz, Yash Technologies Pvt. Ltd, ZenQ, Verity Knowledge Solutions Pvt Ltd, Prolifics Corporation Limited 9th floor
- Building - 20 - Parexel, vSplash Techlabs Pvt. Ltd, Cognizant Technology Solutions, YASH Technologies, RealPage, OMICS, PROLIFICS (Semantic Space Technologies).
- Building - 21 - Colruyt IT Consultancy
- HUDA Techno Enclave - Ocimum Bio Solutions

== HITEX Exhibition Centre ==
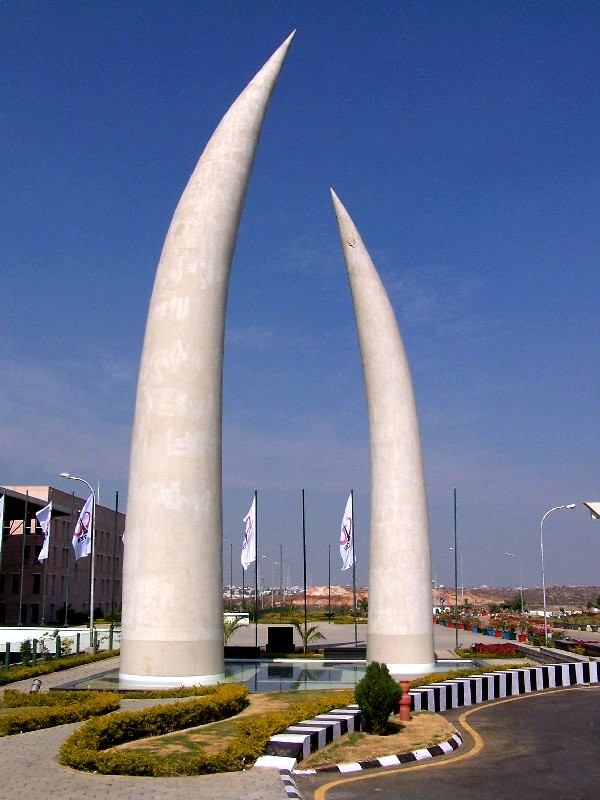
Hitex Exhibition Centre, HITEC City

Hyderabad International Trade Expositions Limited (HITEX) is a venue for international exhibitions, conferences, trade shows, and corporate events in India. Exhibition centre was conceptualised by German architects and opened on 14 January 2003 by Commerce Minister Arun Shourie, and the Hitex Trade Fair Office Building was inaugurated by Andhra Pradesh former Chief Minister N. Chandrababu Naidu.

HITEX is located at Madhapur (near HITEC City). The facility is spread over nearly 40 ha (100 acres).

GITEX Hyderabad, is the annual IT&C expo organised by the Dubai World Trade Centre in association with the Department of IT&C, Government of Telangana.

== HITEC City-2 SEZ ==
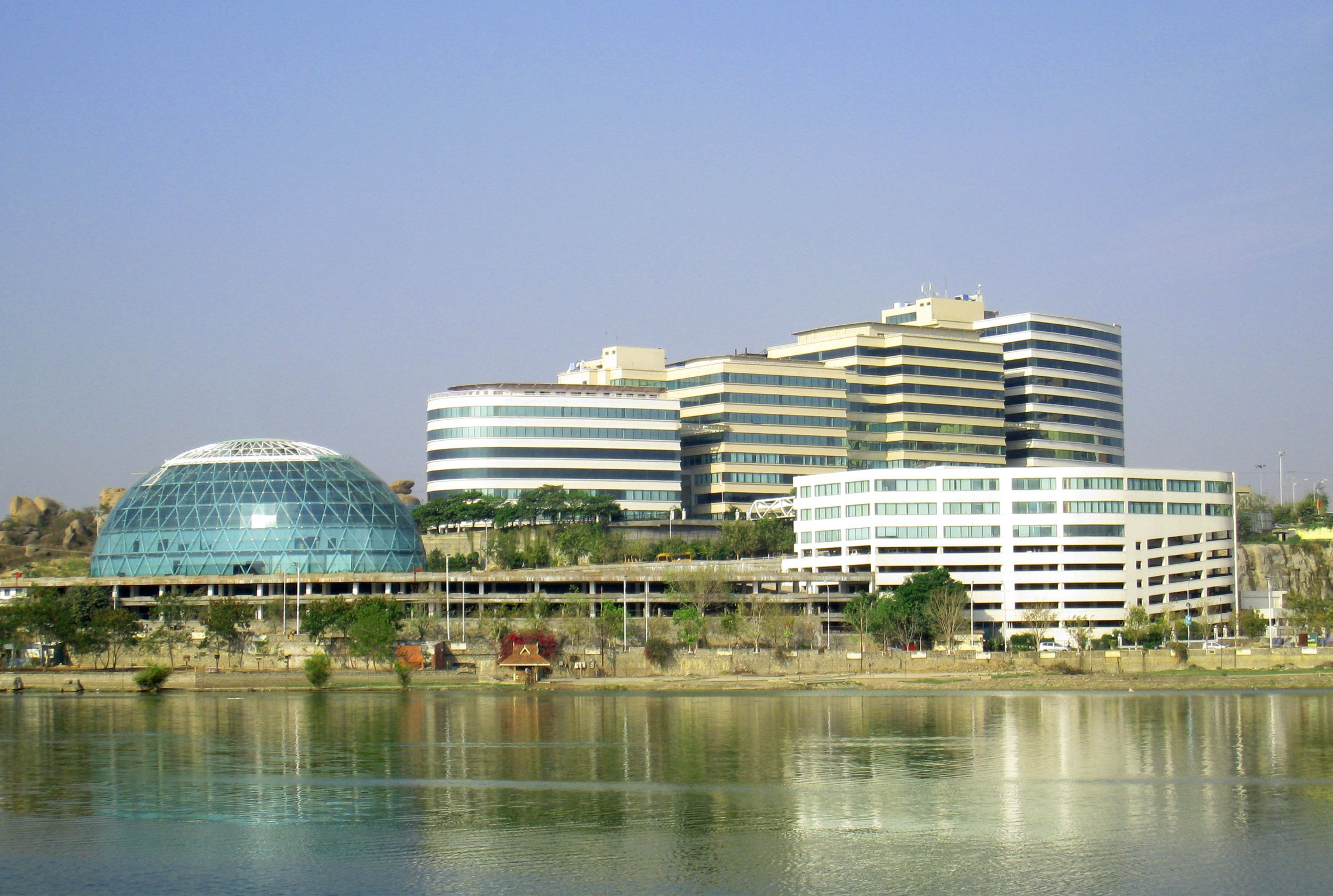
I-Labs The Oval Building HITEC City Hyderabad

HITEC City-2 is a milestone project of Phoenix Infocity Pvt. Ltd. This is a venture by Phoenix Group, India. HITEC City-2 is an IT/ITeS Special Economic Zone (SEZ), and it is being promoted as an extension of HITEC City. The project has received formal approval as an IT/ITeS SEZ from the Ministry of Commerce, Government of India. On an overall built-up area of about 280,000 m^{2} (3,000,000 sq ft), nine IT buildings are proposed with a mix of multi-tenant and custom-built to suit options to be developed in phases. The SEZ design allows about 28,000 IT workers to work in an area of 280,000 m^{2} (3,000,000 sq ft).

It has accommodated MNCs like

- UBS (the Indian operations of which were recently acquired by Cognizant)
- CUBIC Transportation Systems India Private Limited
- ValueMomentum
- MAQ Software
- HCL
- ValueLabs Inc.
- Object Technologies
- IGATE

== Cyber Pearl (an Ascendas IT park) ==
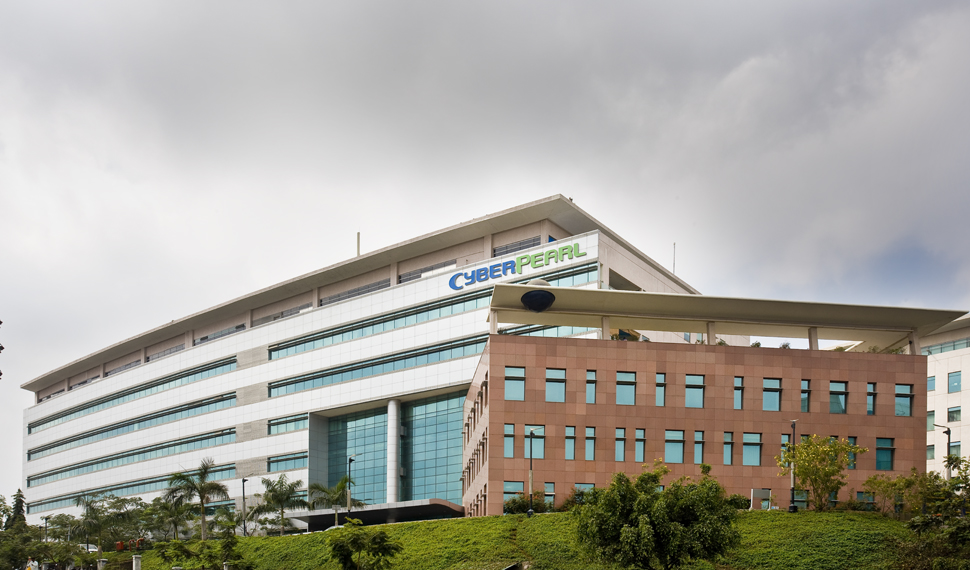
CyberPearl Building HITEC City Hyderabad

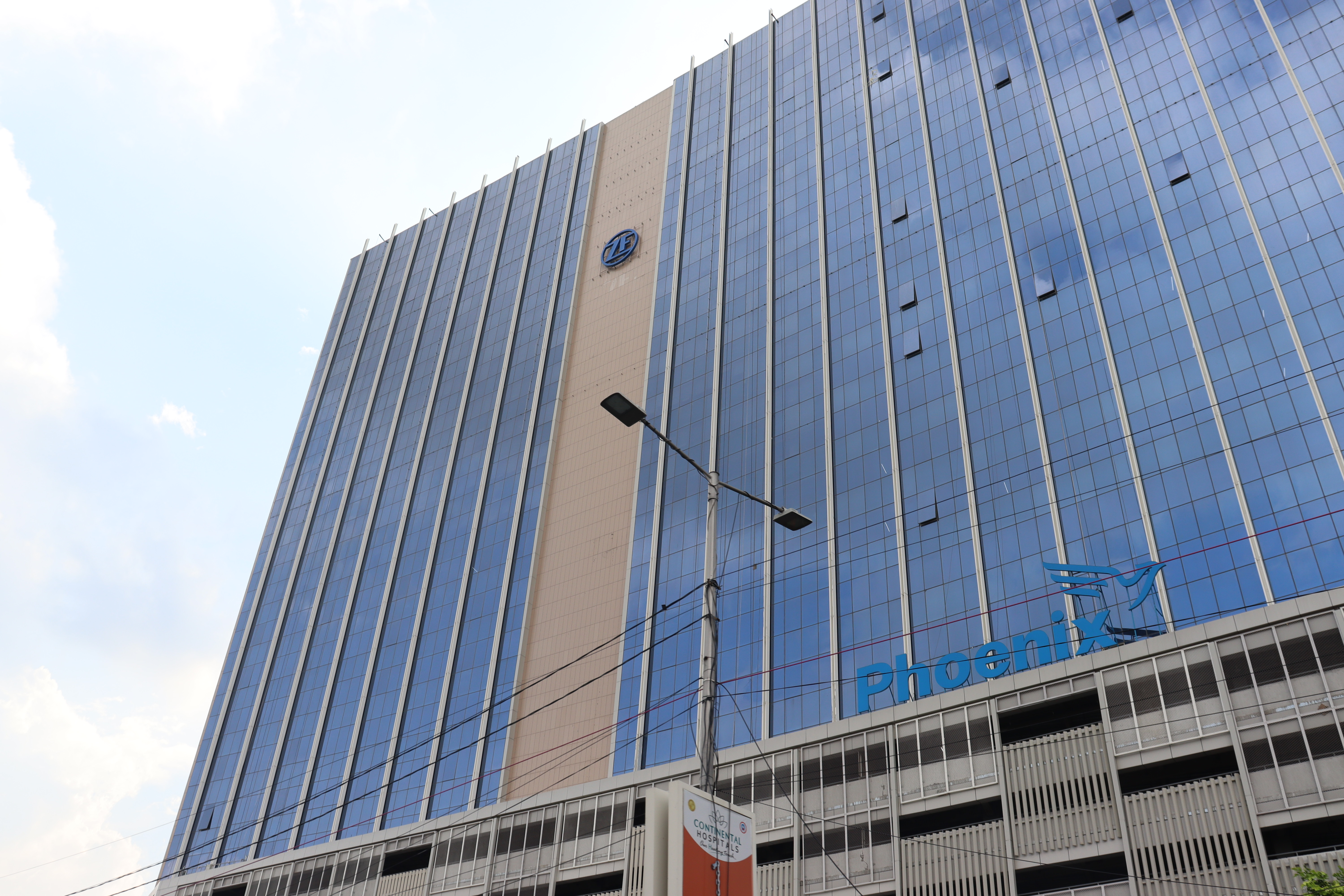
Phoenix Equinox, HITEC City

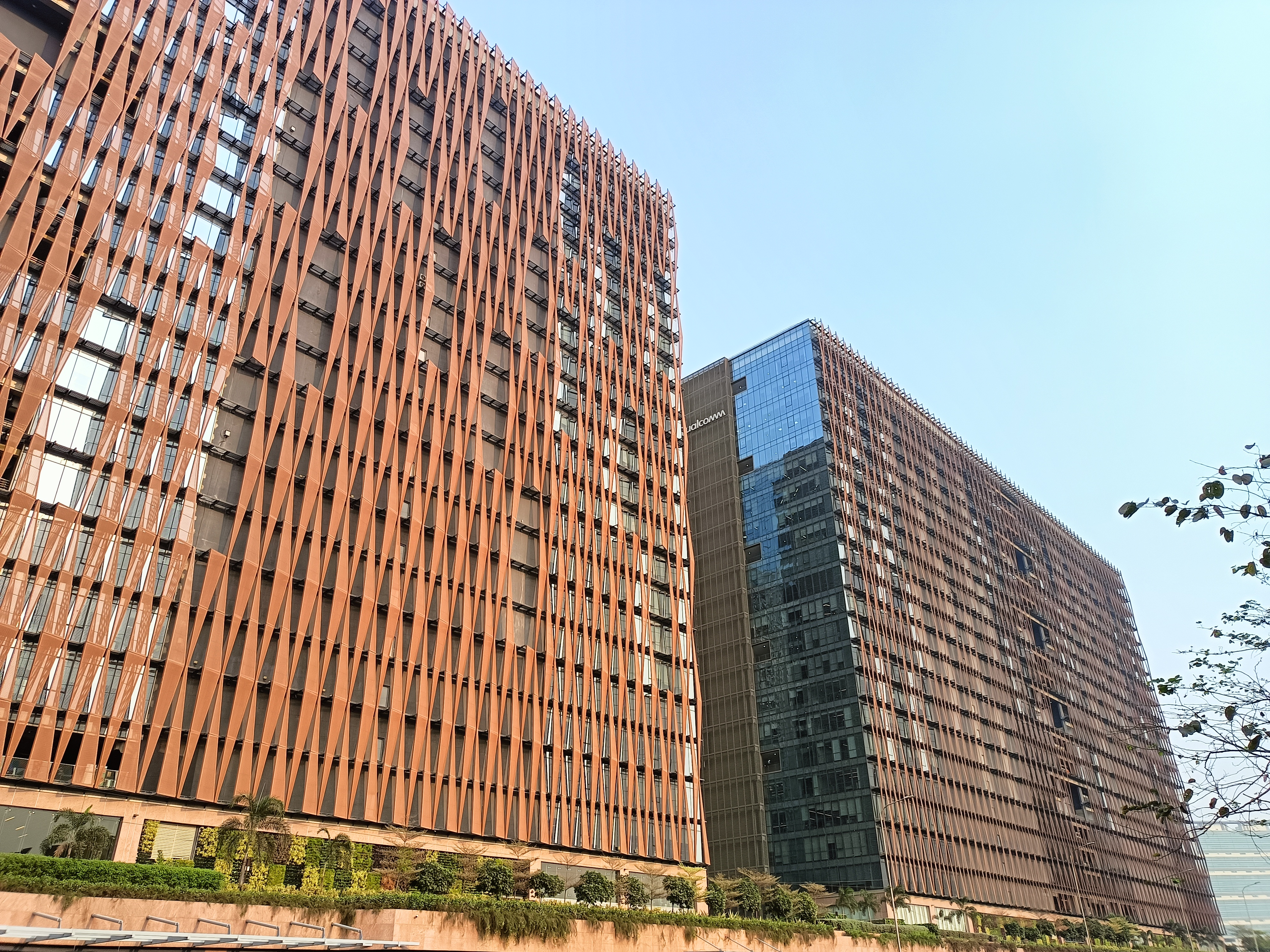
SkyView buildings

CyberPearl is located in the heart of Hyderabad's growth centre. Numerous MNC campuses, commercial facilities and extensive social infrastructure are located nearby the park. Opened in 2004, CyberPearl was the first park in Hyderabad to feature a fully equipped health club and business centre. In-house amenities include a large food court, restaurant, meeting rooms, conference and recreational facilities. Cyber Pearl would have been named Cyber Oasis, but since Hyderabad is associated with pearls, "Pearl" was considered more appropriate. The park accommodates over 5000 IT workers with 5,000,000 square feet (460,000 m^{2}) of office space. Companies located at Cyber Pearl are :

- Winshuttle Software (India) Pvt. Ltd.
- TNS INDIA PVT. LTD.
- Sitel India Ltd
- GE
- Innopark
- UMC
- NTT DATA
- Tech Mahindra
- Salesforce dotcom
- MarketTools Research Pvt Ltd
- RSA/Valyd Software
- SD Softech
- Smartplay Technologies
- ZenQ
- Bank of Baroda - DR Site
- CenturyLink

== Global capability center ==
As of 2025, there are 875 Global capability centers in Bengaluru, compared to around 360 GCCs in Hyderabad, although recent trend shows that Hyderabad is attracting more GCCs set up in India.

=== Facebook, Hyderabad ===
Facebook has had an office in Cyberabad since 2010. It was the fourth Facebook office worldwide.

=== Amazon Global Campus ===
Amazon first started operations in India in 2004 from Hyderabad. Global e-commerce giant amazon inaugurates its first owned and world’s largest campus building in 2019 at Hyderabad that spread across 9.5 acres which can house for more than 15,000 employees, becoming third of Amazon’s total India employee base across six offices. This is Amazon’s single largest building in the anywhere worldwide in terms of total built-up area and the campus will spread out with spanning over 68 acres.

=== Other campuses around HITEC city ===
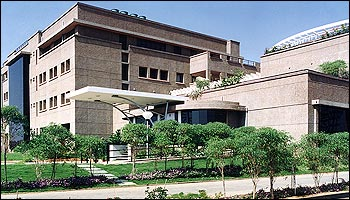
Wipro campus

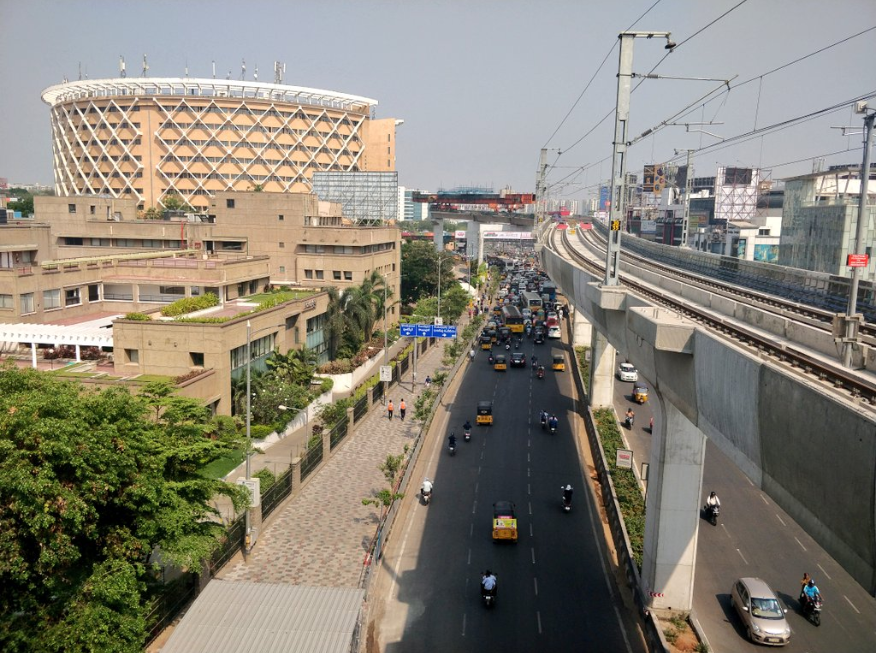
Hyderabad metro towards Cyber Towers

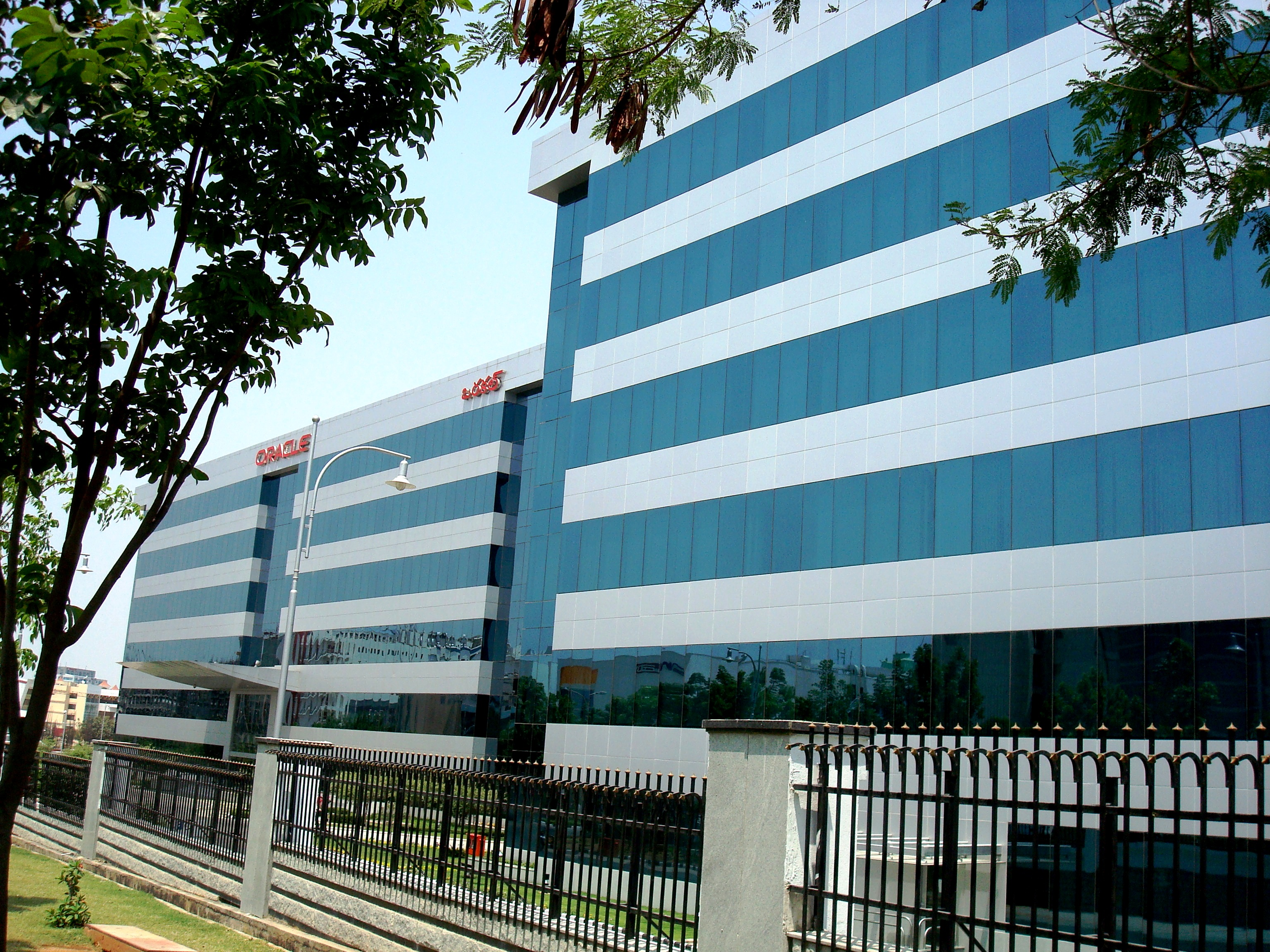
Oracle Campus

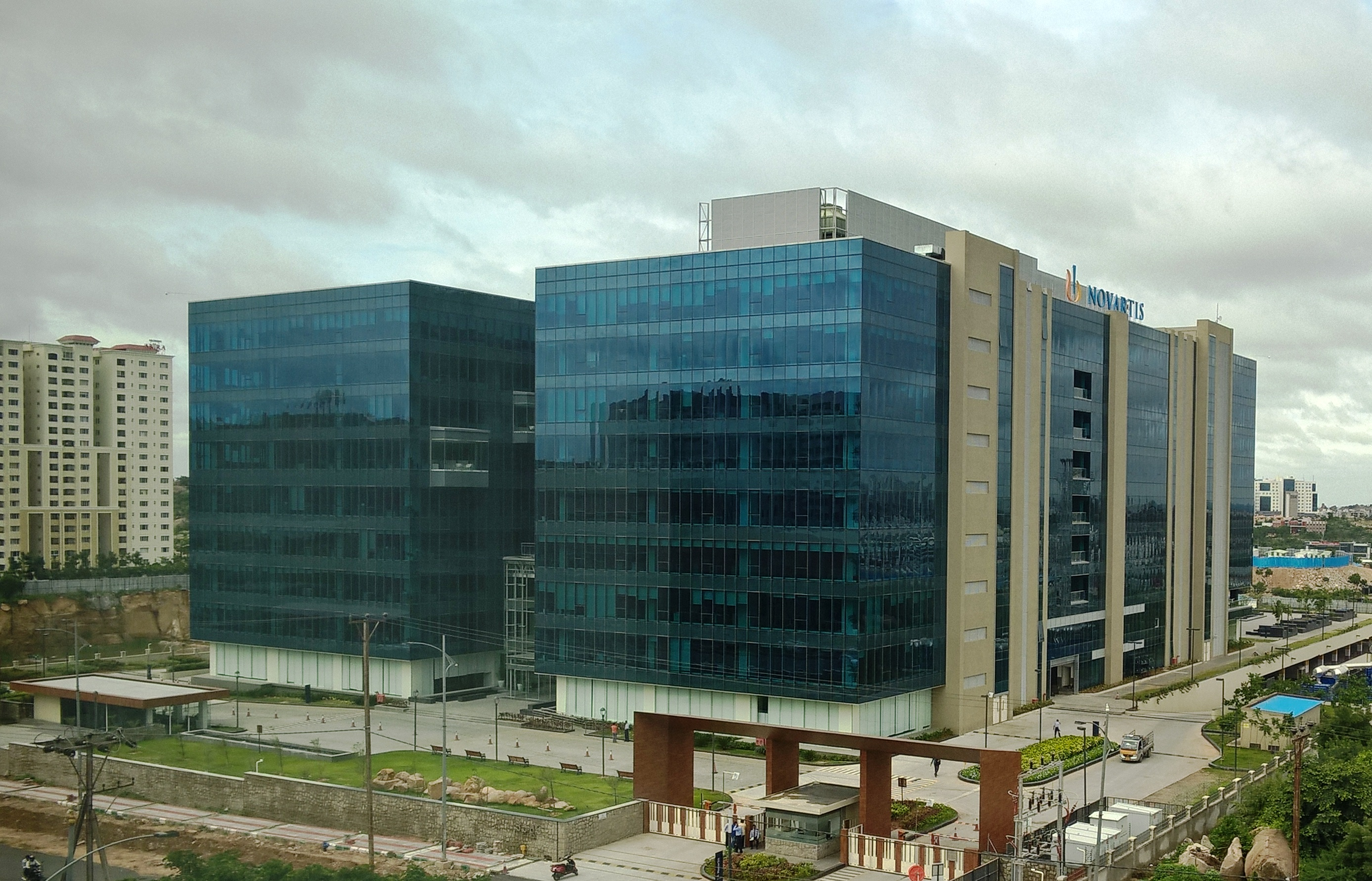
Novartis India headquarter campus

Oracle Campus, HITEC City Microsoft R&D Campus in Gachibowli, Hyderabad.

Several companies have opened built to suit facilities in and around HITEC city. Some of these are:

- Tecreos Overseas Education Consultants
- Ananth Technologies
- Aurobindo Pharma, Water Mark Building
- Computer Maintenance Corporation
- Convergys Campus
- Cyient Campus
- NetCracker Technology Corp.
- DELL Campus
- CyberCity I.T. Campus
- E-Park I.T. Campus (Currently leased by TCS)
- Franklin Templeton campus
- Honeywell Campus
- Hindustan Petroleum Corporation Limited. IT Data Centre
- HSBC Campus
- Capgemini Campus
- iLabs Centre
- Infosys Campus
- Login4ITES Network
- Microsoft Campus
- Motorola Campus
- Oracle Campus
- Polaris Campus
- Tech Mahindra Cyber Space Campus
- Tech Mahindra Infocity Campus
- Reliance Communications
- Sierra Atlantic Campus
- SoftSol Campus
- Tata Consultancy Services (TCS) Campus (Deccan Park)
- UBS (now Cognizant)
- ValueLabs Campus
- VSNL campus
- WIPRO Campus (Gachibowli)
- Zensar technologies Ltd
- Simply Write Consulting Services

== The V, an Ascendas IT Park ==
The V is spread across 20 acres (8 ha) and has five multi-tenant buildings with a gross floor area of 1.65 million sq ft (90,000 m^{2}) having close to 100% occupancy.

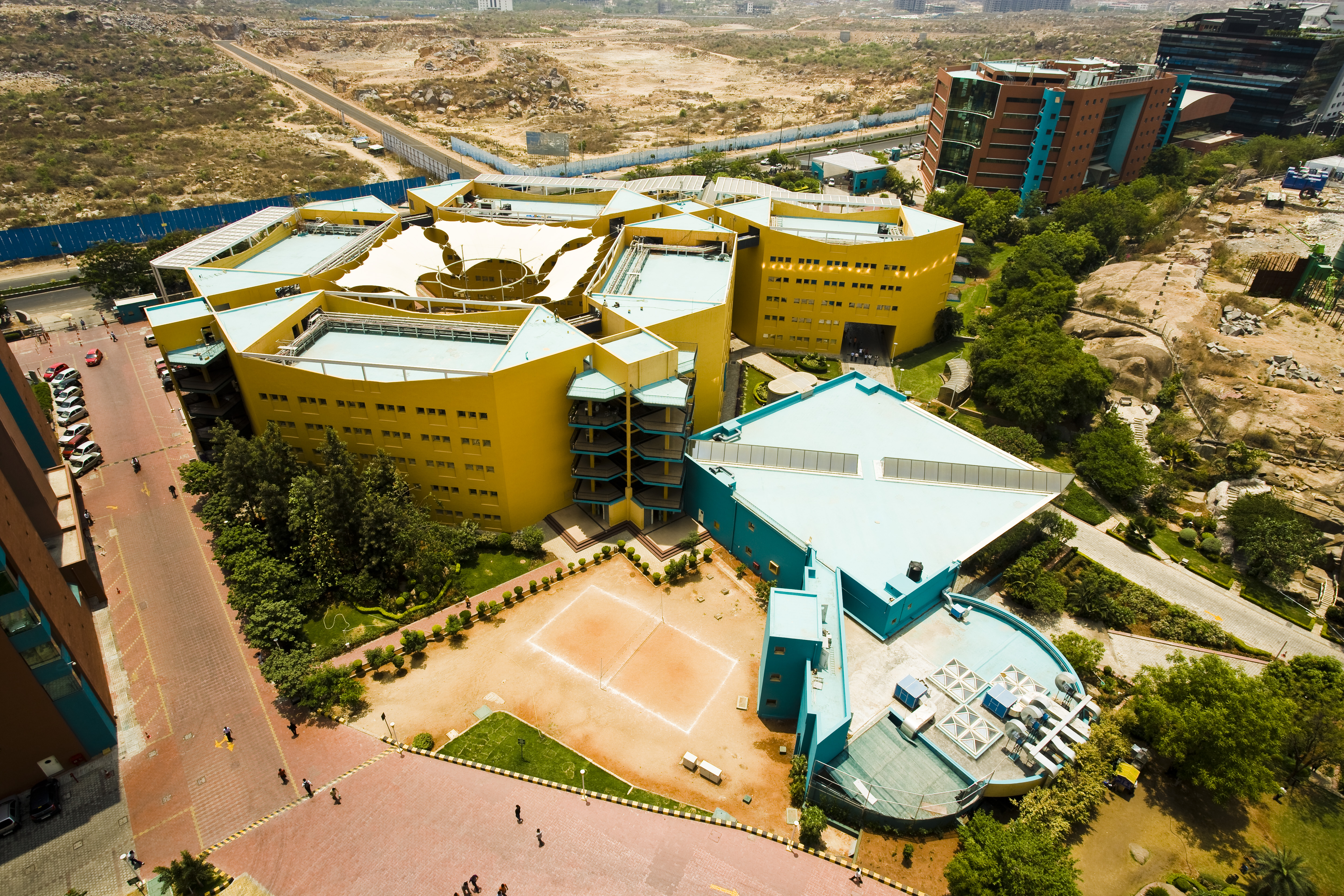
V, an Ascendas IT Park at Hitec city

With over 10 acres (4 ha) of open space, it is a green township with landscaped gardens. Most of the large rock formations have been left untouched, with the buildings designed around the natural landscape. The V is the first IT park which is completely operational. It accommodates about 15,000 IT professionals.

It is about 10 km from the city center and 14 km from the airport, both being within an hour's drive. The nearest local train station is around 3 km from the campus.

The V is composed of five buildings.

- Mariner
- Auriga
- Orion
- Capella
- Vega

== The TCS Deccan Park Campus ==
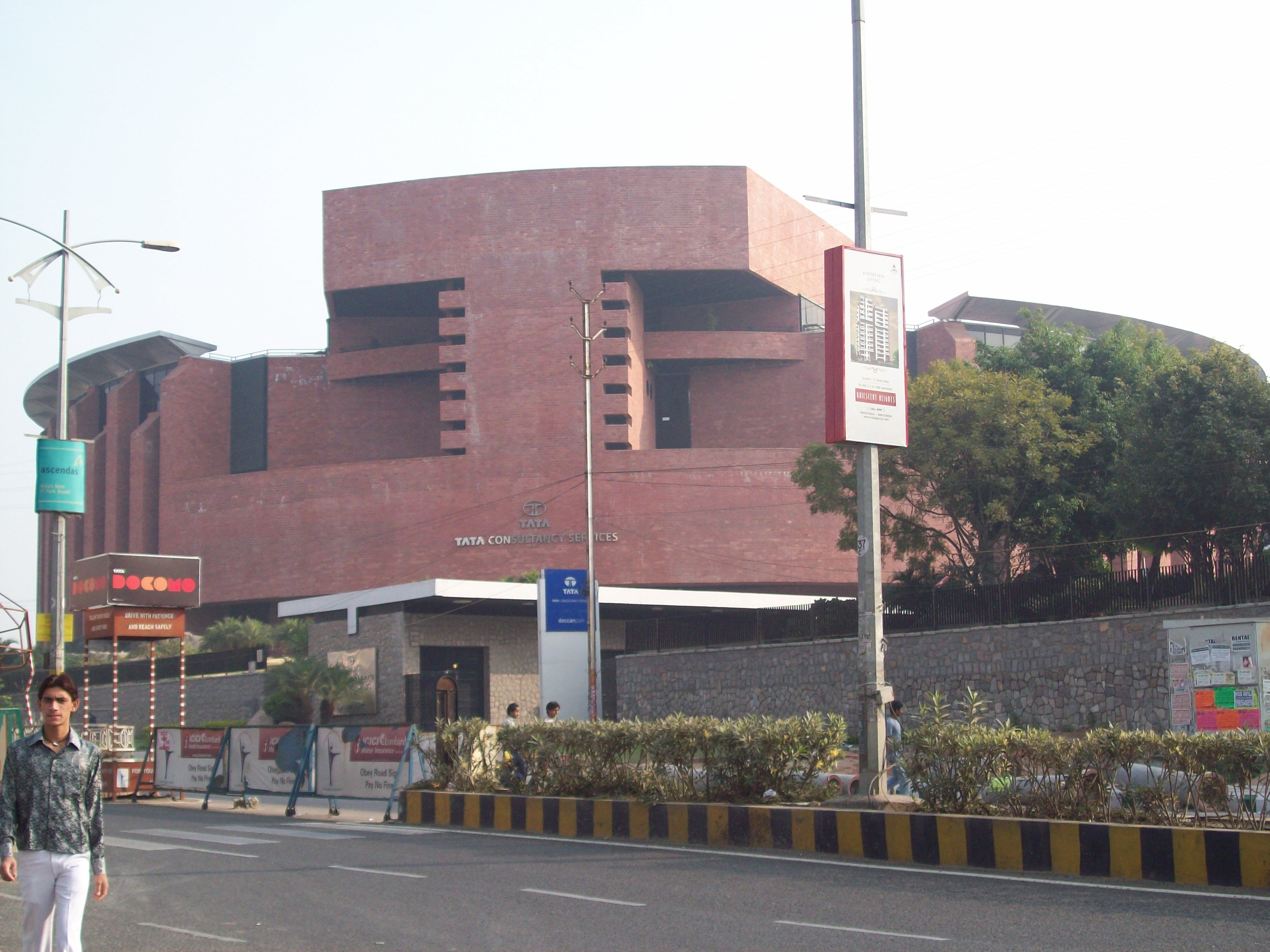
Tata Consultancy Services, Hyderabad

The Deccan park is the largest global development centre of the Tata Consultancy Services opened in 2003. The facility was designed by Swiss architect Mario Botta. The Deccan Park has been set up with an estimated investment of ₹15 billion with recreation and sporting facilities, which houses more than 2,200 professionals. The centre has been set up in 11 acres (4.5 ha) of land, with a built-up area around 320,000 ft^{2} (30,000 m^{2}) on 9 floors. The centre works in domain areas such as telecommunications, e-governance, biological sciences, ports, and shipping and also deploy technologies including .Net, opensource billing and bioinformatics.

== RMZ Futura IT Park ==
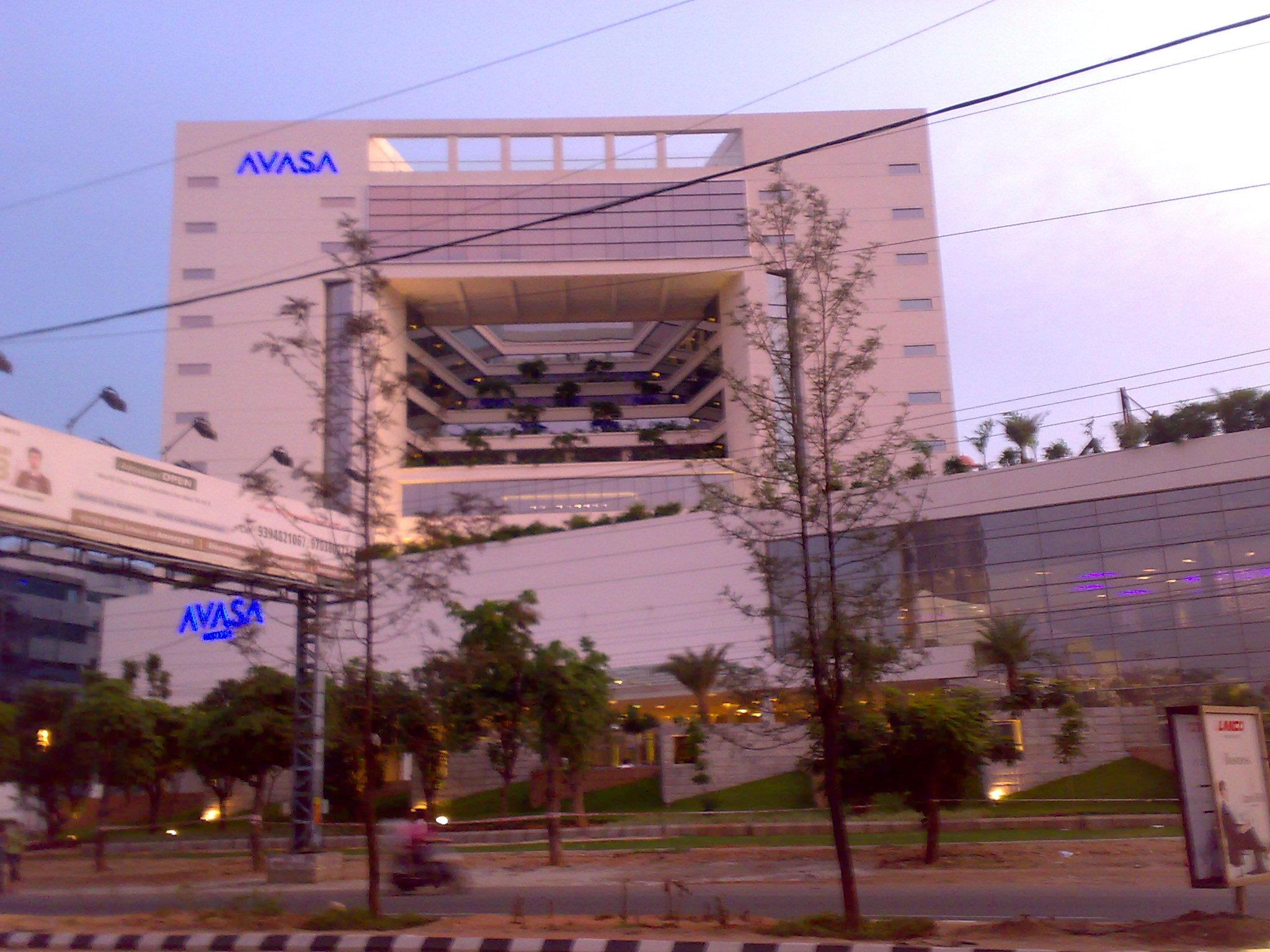
Avasa Hotel in HITEC City

RMZ FUTURA is an exclusive independent/built-to-suit facility set amidst HITEC city owned by RMZ Corp, adjacent to Cyber Gateway. The state-of-the-art structure comprises four independent blocks spread across the entire site.

The RMZ FUTURA IT Park is composed of four buildings. All four buildings have been occupied.

- CGI on the fourth floor; other floors constitute Deloitte Block A
- Deloitte Block B
- Deloitte Block C
- Deloitte Block D

== Shilpakala Vedika ==
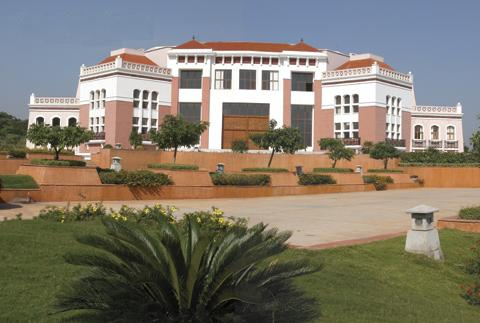
Shilpakala Vedika

Shilpakala Vedika, constructed under the government of N. Chandrababu Naidu, is located in a 60,000 sq ft (5,600 m2) plot, on a 5 acres (20,000 m2) land, with a seating capacity of 2,500. It is a state-of-the-art facility comprising a press room, cafeteria, modern multi-media projection system, luxurious green rooms, good acoustics and exquisite ethnic decor. This auditorium was held by M/S Sanpra Group and M/S Alif Group under a BOOT contract.

== See also ==
- Financial District, Hyderabad
- Genome Valley
- Fintech Valley Vizag
