= Economy of Hyderabad =

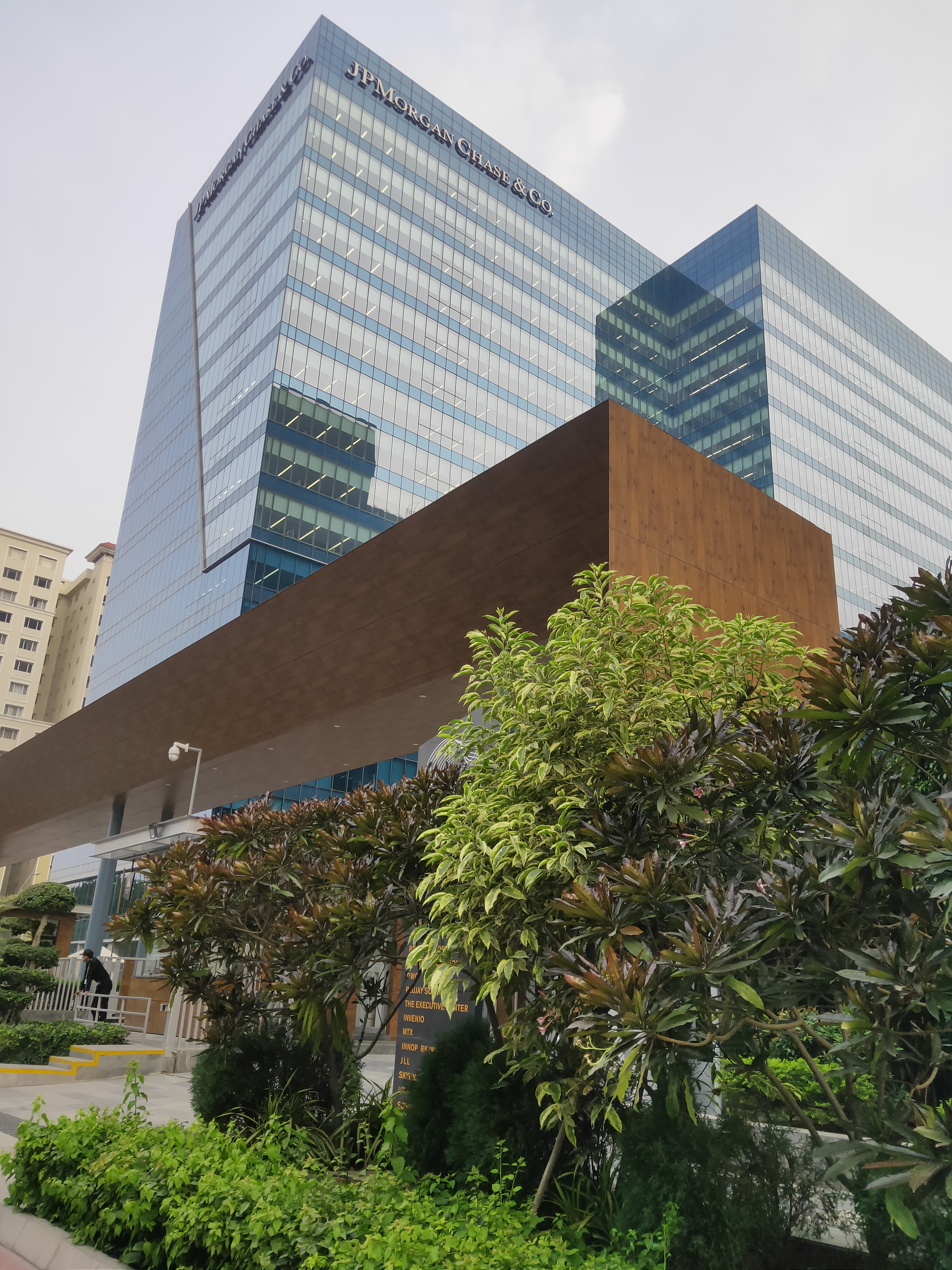
JP Morgan Tower, Hyderabad.

The economy of Hyderabad, the capital of Telangana, India, is based on traditional manufacturing, the knowledge sector and tourism. Starting in the 1990s, the economic pattern of the city changed from a primary service hub to a more diversified economy, but the service industry still remains a major contributor. As of 2006, the largest employers of Hyderabad are the governments of Andhra Pradesh and India, with 113,000 and 85,000 employees, respectively.

Since its inception in 1591, Hyderabad has been a global trade center in multiple areas, including its status as the world's only diamond market. City-based handicrafts were sold in the Middle East and Western countries. During the rule of the Nizam's in the 1930s, industrial growth started with the establishment of a diversified industrial zone, which grew in parallel with traditional manufacturing.

In the 1930s and 1940s, city-based industries started importing technology from the western world for industrial manufacturing. With the introduction of the railways, the city became well connected with the port cities of Bombay (now Mumbai), Madras (now Chennai), Calcutta (now Kolkata), and Karachi (now in Pakistan). During the 1950s and 1960s, most of the Indian premier public enterprises—BHEL, NMDC, HMT, BEL, IDPL, ECIL, DRDO, and HAL—were established in Hyderabad, changing the economical pattern of the city from a traditional manufacturing to a cosmopolitan industrial service sector.

Hyderabad, being the capital of Telangana, is the largest contributor to the state's GDP (Gross domestic product) and state tax. In 2011, Hyderabad generated revenues of ₹700,000 million (US$7.5 billion) and contributed a third of the state's tax revenue. In 2023, the GDP was US$ 83.5 billion, ranking it as the seventh most productive metro area in India. Hyderabad and its suburbs house the highest number of special economic zones among India's cities.

In the 1970s, the pharmaceutical and electronic industries were established in the city because of its strategic location in south-central India, for which it is known as the gateway to south-central India. Since the 1990s, the economic patterns of the city have changed it from a primary service hub to a more diversified spectrum, with the growth of IT enterprises, biotech, insurance, and financial institutions, and a strong employment base in ancillary activities such as trade and commerce, transport, storage, communication, real-estate and retail, which employ three times more people than the IT industries. As of 2022, Hyderabad has 7,78,121 employees in the IT/ITES sector, working in more than 1500 companies. The service industry in this arena remains dominant, with 90% of the workforce. As of 2005, out of every 1000 people of working age, 770 males and 190 females are employed. As of April 2026, the Hyderabad hosts 350–400+ Global Capability Centers; GCCs in Hyderabad employ over 300,000 professionals and capturing ~20% of India’s total GCCs. It accounted for 41–46% of all new GCC setups in 2025–early 2026, overtaking Bengaluru in greenfield expansions.

GCCs dominated office leasing in 2025, taking 38–45% of India’s record 31+ million sq ft nationally. Hyderabad alone absorbed ~5.1–6 million sq ft in GCC space while contributing strongly to the city’s 10–11+ million sq ft annual absorption., there are 875 Global capability centers in Bengaluru, compared to around 360 GCCs in Hyderabad, although recent trend shows that Hyderabad is attracting more GCCs set up in India.

== Tourism ==
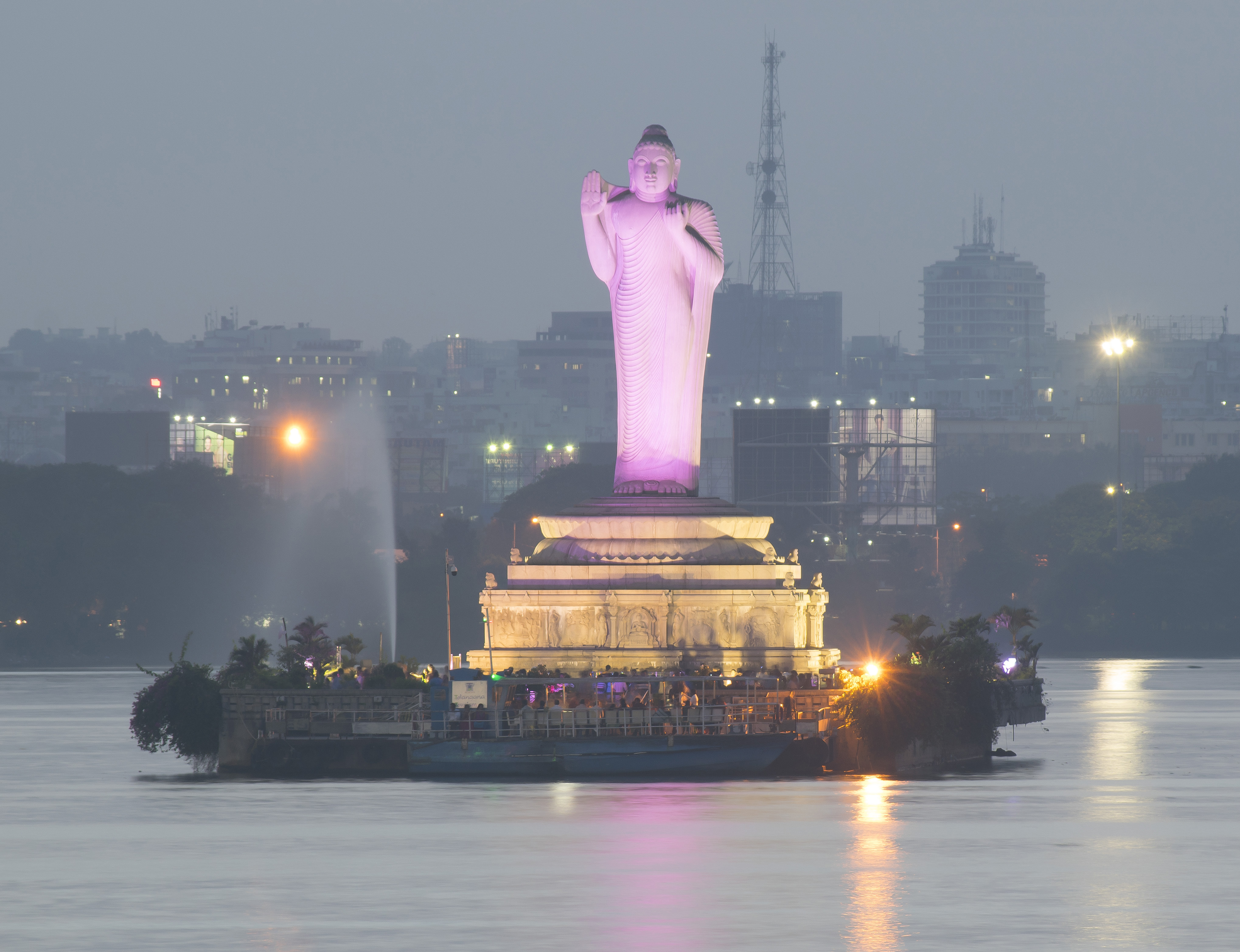
Buddha Statue in Hussain Sagar

In March 2012, The Indian Union Tourism Ministry declared Hyderabad as the first ever "Best Heritage City of India".

Hyderabad was the World's third best city to visit in 2013, according to Lonely Planet. In 2011 the city was ranked nineteenth in the world by The New York Times in The list of 41 Places to Go in 2011, the only Indian City in the list. Hyderabad is known as the City of Pearls, due to the presence of pearls trading industry—until the 18th century the city was the only global trade center of large diamonds. Many traditional and historical bazaars are located in the city. The Laad Bazaar and nearby markets have shops that sell pearls, diamonds and other traditional ware and cultural antiques.

Hyderabad emerged as a pharmaceutical and biotechnology hub and is known as India's pharmaceutical capital and "Genome Valley of India". In 2008–2009, Hyderabad's bio-pharmaceuticals exports reached US$3.1 billion. The south—central location of Hyderabad, and the incorporation of Indian Drugs and Pharmaceuticals Limited (IDPL) in 1961 proved to be a foundation of pharmaceutical industry in Hyderabad, later in the 1990s the expansion in the industry took place with the formation of Indian Institute of Chemical Technology, National Institute of Pharmaceutical Education and Research, the Centre for Cellular and Molecular Biology and National Institute of Nutrition along with the regional institutions making Hyderabad the hub of pharmaceutical and biotechnology in India.

The establishment of the public sector in biotechnology and the Genome Valley, Fab City and the Nano Technology Park established significant infrastructure in bio-technology. These attributes attracted regional companies and MNCs to set up offices, warehouses, research and development centres in the city. In 2012, the city hosted the Convention on Biological Diversity (2012 COP 11).

The commercial market structure of Hyderabad is defined into 4 sectors—The Central Business Districts (CBD), the sub-central business centres, the neighbourhood business centres and local business centres. Since 2007, the retail industry in Hyderabad is on the rise, and several central business districts are spread across the city.

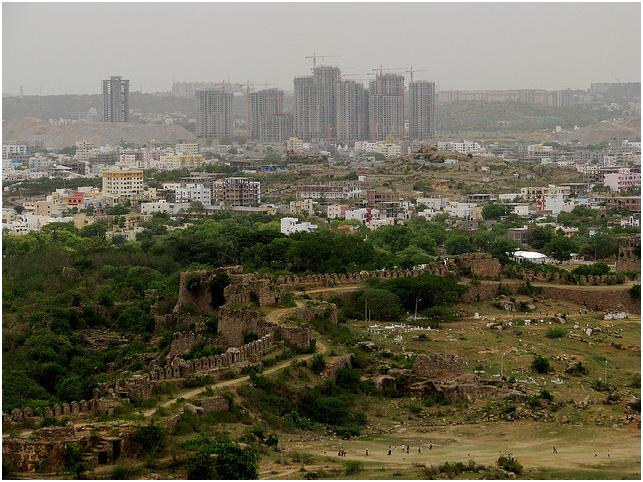
A view of 16th century ruined city of Naya Qila

== Retail and real estate ==
The World Bank Group ranked the city as the second-best Indian city for doing business in 2009. In 2020, the economic analysis group GaWC ranked Hyderabad in its second tier (Beta- World City) of cities by importance. In 2011, DTZ ranked Hyderabad as world's third most affordable office location, while Business Today ranked Hyderabad as the fourth best city to live in India. Hyderabad witnessed a high growth in the real estate business, making it among the top five concentrated cities for housing in India. In 2007–08, the city's prime residential areas of Banjara Hills and Jubilee Hills reached the highest growth percentage in India. The Economic Times evaluated Banjara Hills to be worth US$20.7 billion.

Hyderabad experienced a significant construction boom beginning in the lata 2010s, especially concentrated in the western areas near its IT corridor. The growth was fuelled by the arrival of numerous tech companies, rising levels of foreign investment, and a growing upper-middle-class demographic. State-driven initiatives like the Telangana Building Permission Approval and Self-Certification System (TS-bPASS) played a key role in this expansion by simplifying the process of getting approvals for high-rise developments.

By 2025, Hyderabad had the second-largest number of skyscrapers in India, after Mumbai. The city has at least 61 skyscrapers exceeding 150 metres (492 ft) in height, with SAS Crown as the tallest building in Hyderabad. SAS iTower in Khajaguda is the world’s largest skyscraper by floor area and the fourth-largest office building in the world. The skyline continues to reflect its rapid development and evolution into one of the biggest economic hubs in India.

== Information technology ==
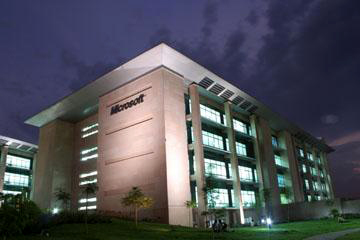
Microsoft R&D Campus

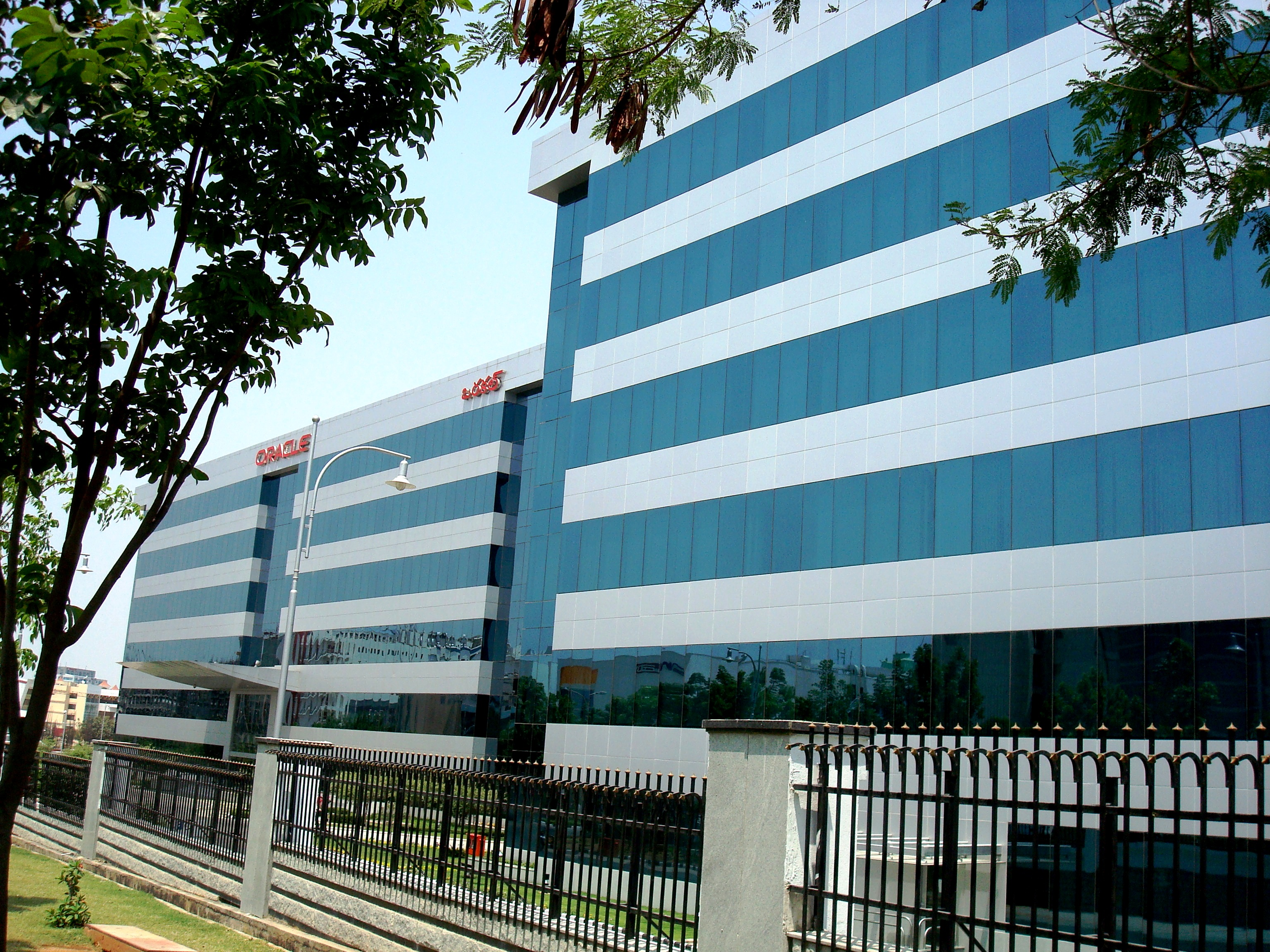
Oracle Campus, HITEC City

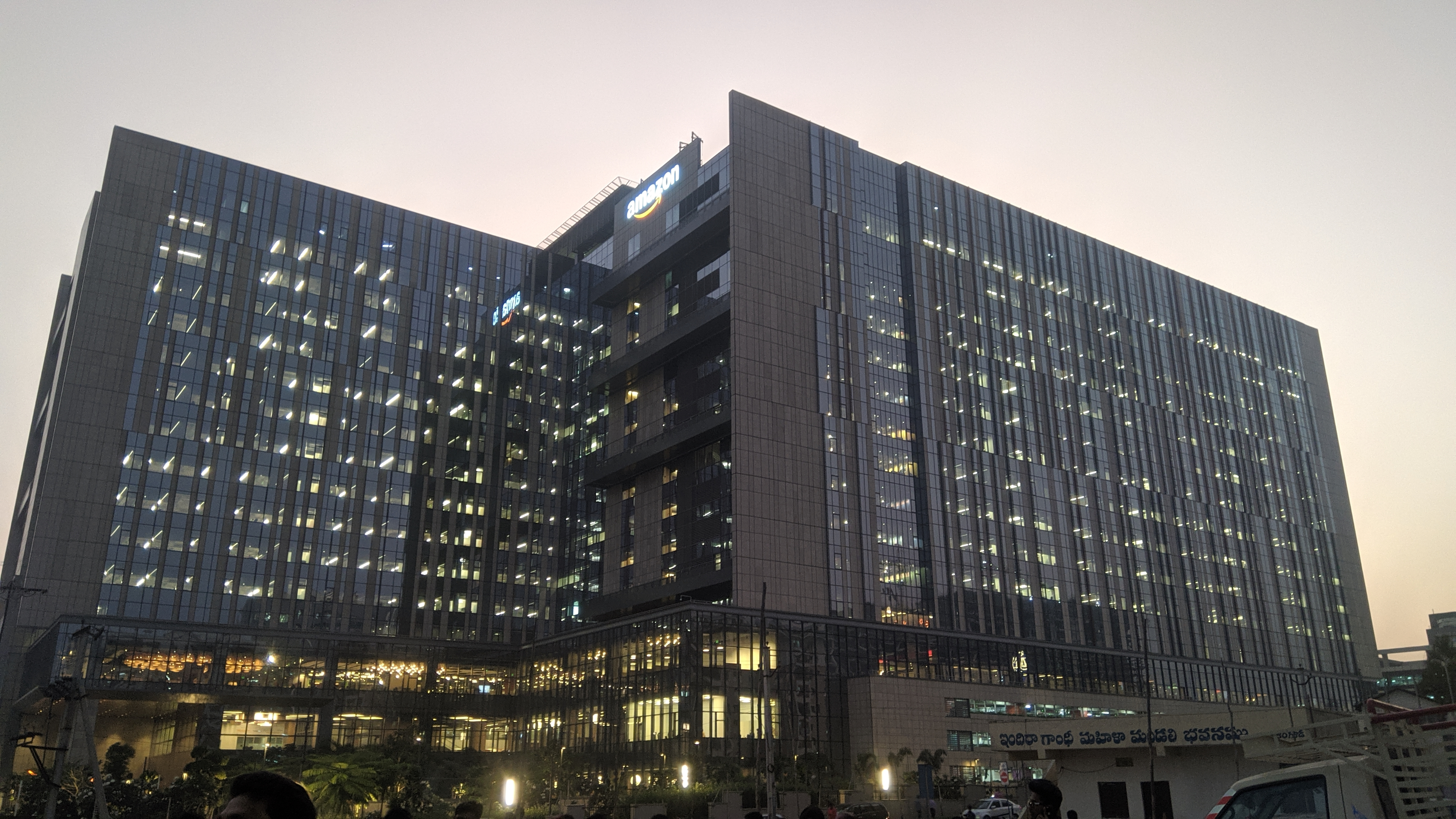
Amazon Campus in Financial District

Hyderabad is among the global centres of information technology for which it is known as Cyberabad (Cyber City). The city's IT sector includes the IT-enabled services, business process outsourcing, entertainment industries, and Financial services. During 2008–09, Hyderabad's IT exports reached US$ 4.7 billion, and 22% of the NASSCOM's total membership is from Hyderabad. The development of a township with related technological infrastructure called HITEC City prompted global and particularly US—based companies to establish their operations in Hyderabad. The Deloitte, Franklin Templeton Investments, GE Capital, Accenture, HSBC, Bank of America, ABN AMRO, S&P Global, Ernst & Young, KPMG, Capgemini, Genpact are some of the financial services companies with offices in the city. In Hyderabad, the central region of the business happens in Nanakramguda Financial District, HITECH City, the Madhapur suburb, Kokapet SEZ (Neopolis) and Salarpuria Sattva Knowledge City.

As of 2022, Hyderabad has 778,121 employees in the IT/ITES sector, working in more than 1500 companies. Hyderabad added two companies in unicorn startup list in first two months of 2022. The IT exports from Hyderabad (Telangana) stood second in India at ₹183,569 crore (US$23 billion) in FY 2021-22 improving from previous year. The major multinational IT firms located in Hyderabad are Microsoft (the largest R&D campus outside the US), Google, Thoughtworks, CA Technologies, Amazon, IBM, Motorola, Samsung, Agilent, ADP, Oracle Corporation, Yahoo!, Dell, Texas Instruments, Hewlett-Packard, Virtusa, Kewill, Facebook and others. The major Indian firms with development centres in the city are Tech Mahindra, Infosys, Wipro, Cognizant, Recykal, Tata Consultancy Services, Polaris, and others. The main areas where such IT and ITeS campuses have been set up are Madhapur, Gachibowli, Kondapur and Uppal. Apple announced the opening of a new office in Hyderabad that will focus on development of its Maps product.

=== Information Technology Investment Region (ITIR) ===
The Information Technology Investment Region (ITIR), Hyderabad is an upcoming IT investment region jointly being developed by the government of India and Government of Telangana. The union government has given in-principle approval on Sept 8th, 2012 for the Information Technology Investment Region (ITIR) for development of self-contained integrated knowledge clusters for growth of IT and electronic hardware manufacturing in 50,000 acres in and around Hyderabad. The project which is modeled along the lines of Shenzhen SEZ in China, is aimed at attracting an investment of Rs 2.19 trillion ($44 billion) in the IT, ITES and electronics sectors and providing direct employment to 1.5 million people.

Under the mega project, special economic zones (SEZs), industrial parks, free trade zones, warehousing zones and export-oriented units would come up in three corridors around the city which includes the areas Madhapur, Gachibowli, Uppal, Mamidipalli, Raviryal, Adibatla and Maheswaram, and Pocharam. The Indian government proposed to develop the infrastructure for ITIR at an estimated cost of over Rs 2.19 lakh crore.

On 20 September 2013 the central government gave the official approval for the ITIR project

In April 2016, the central government informed Telangana state government that it would revise the entire plan. This, according to sources, may lead to the delay in the estimated investments of Rs 3 lakh crore and creation of nearly 60 lakh jobs. No explanation was given as why such a revision was required.

== Automobiles ==
In 1942, Hyderabad Allwyn was established in Hyderabad as city's first auto-components manufacturing and assembling unit. The cities strategic geographical location had attracted national and multinational companies to start up there operations, manufacturing, research and development centers in and around the city, transforming Hyderabad into emerging hub of the automobile industry that includes the electric vehicle industry.

In present times, the Hyderabad economic zone houses national and multinational companies such as; Hyundai, Hyderabad Allwyn, Praga Tools, HMT Bearings, Ordnance Factory Medak, Tata Boeing Aerospace, Deccan Auto and Mahindra & Mahindra. Fiat Chrysler Automobiles, Maruti Suzuki and Triton Energy will invest in Hyderabad.

== See also ==
- Category:Companies based in Hyderabad, India
- Christian Chamber of Commerce and Industry
- Economy of Bangalore
