= Software industry in Telangana =

Software industry in the Indian state of Telangana

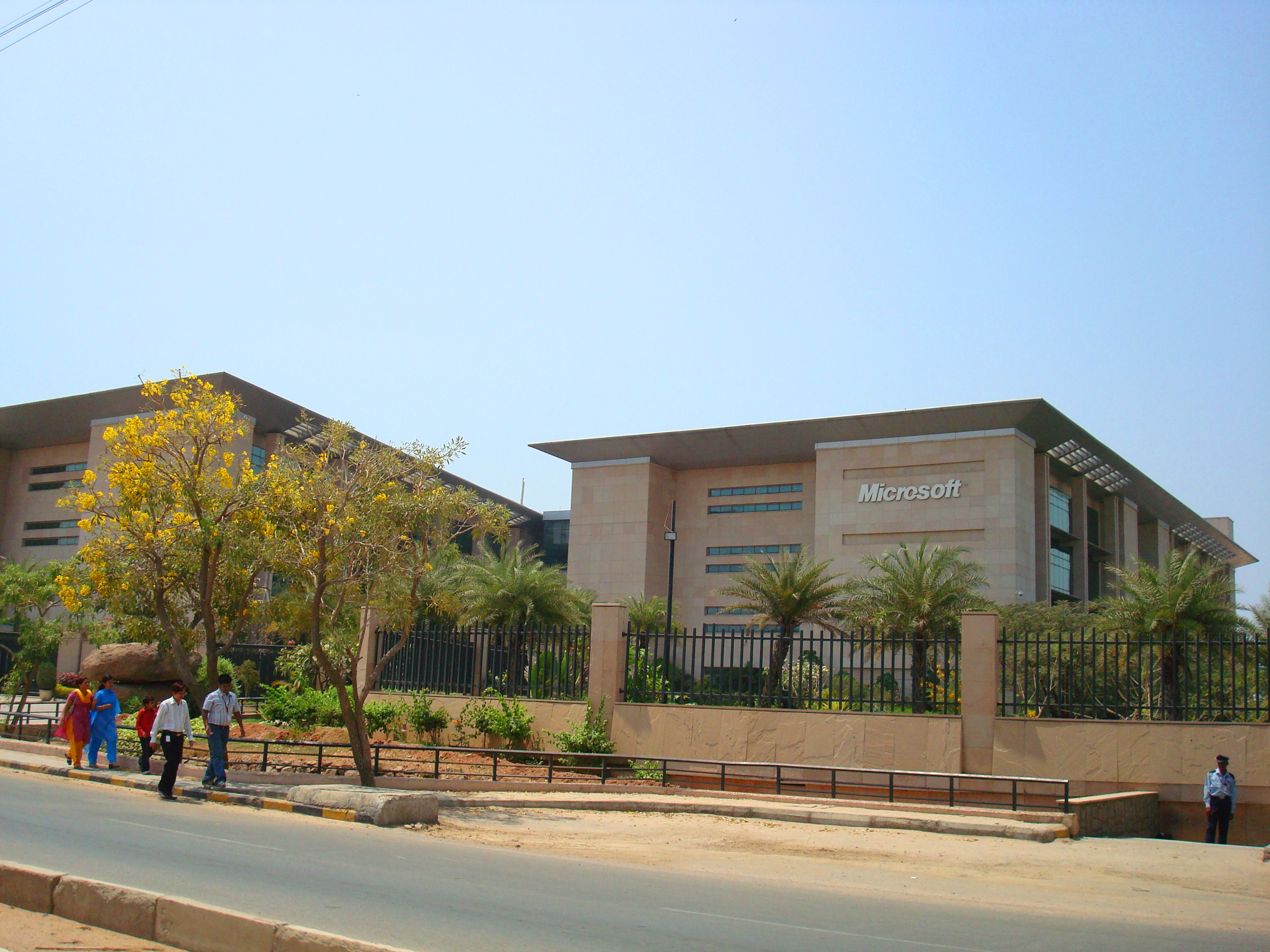
Microsoft campus at Hyderabad

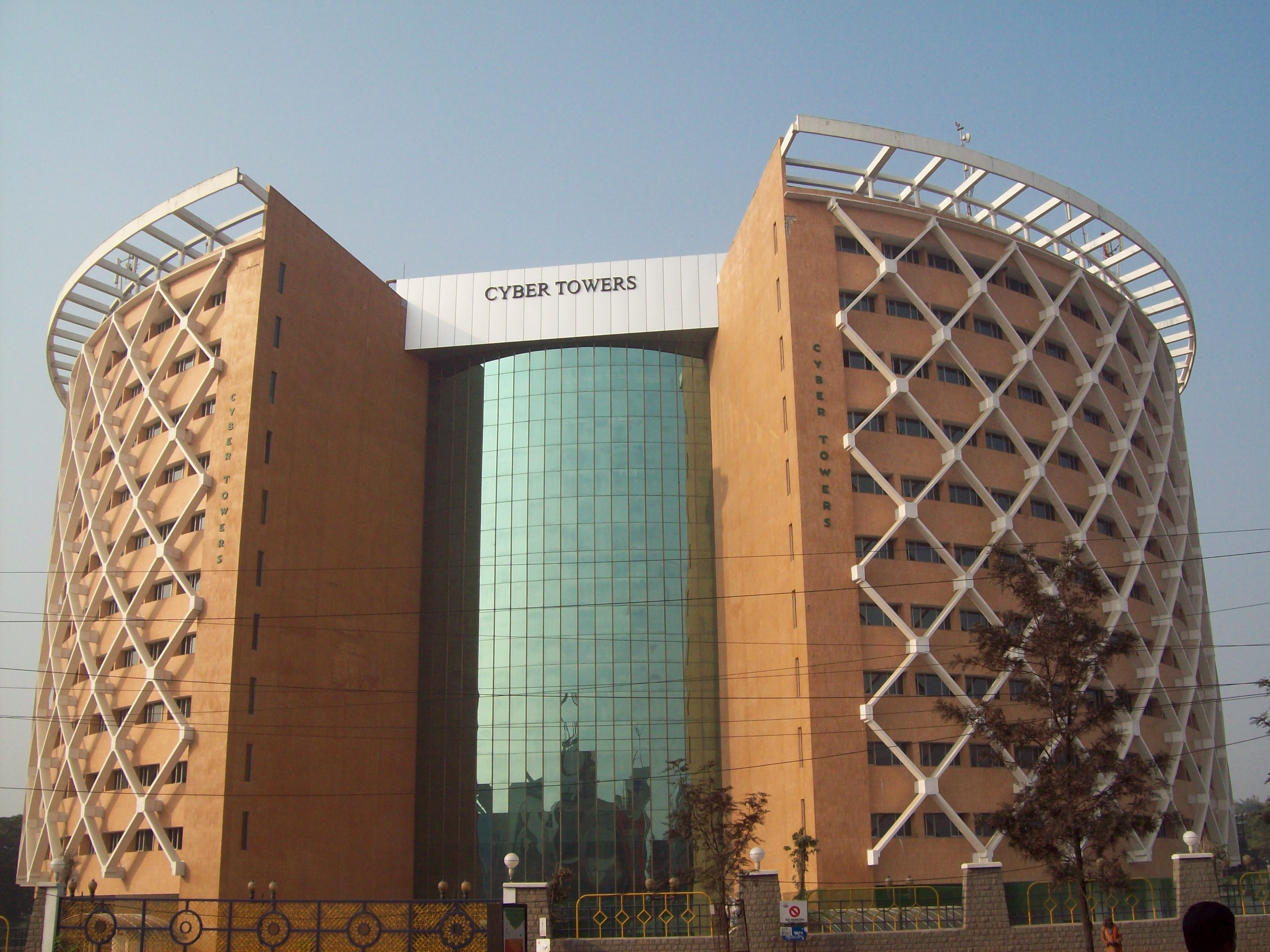
Cyber Towers, HITEC City

During the 2022–23 fiscal year, the Indian state of Telangana recorded a 31.44% year-on-year growth rate in software exports, contributing to roughly 15% to 16% of India'stotal software exports. While the majority of the industry is concentrated in Hyderabad, other cities are also becoming significant IT destinations in the state. Hyderabad houses the largest campuses of tech giants like Microsoft, Amazon, and Google outside of the US. In Hyderabad, the central region of the business happens in Financial District, HITECH City, the Madhapur suburb, Kokapet SEZ (Neopolis) and Salarpuria Sattva Knowledge City. As of 2023, Hyderabad had 9,05,715 employees in the IT/ITES sector, working in more than 1500 companies. The number of startups in Telangana increased from 400 in 2016 to 2,000 in 2022. Hyderabad added two companies to the unicorn startup list in the first two months of 2022. As of 2026, there are 950+ Global capability centers in Bengaluru, compared to around 450+ GCCs in Hyderabad, although recent trend shows that Hyderabad is attracting more GCCs set up in India.

The IT exports from Hyderabad (Telangana) stood second in India at ₹2,68,233 crore (US$ 32.23 billion) in FY 2023-24, improving from the previous year. IT sector exports from Telangana account for 50 per cent of total exports from the state. Telangana contributed to 16.77 per cent of Indian IT sector employment as of FY 2023.

== History ==
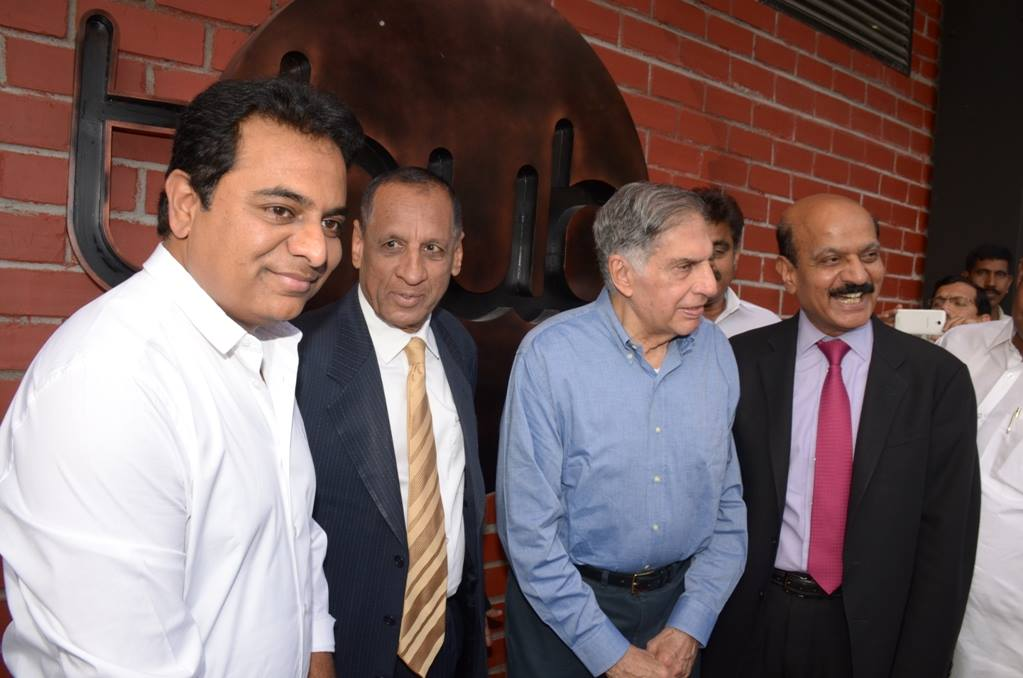
T-Hub launch by Ratan Tata

The first IT tower in Hyderabad was established by the name Intergraph in Begumpet in 1986. The initiation of this Software Industry in Hyderabad was done by N. Chandrababu Naidu in 1995. HITEC City, nicknamed Cyberabad, was set up with the collaboration of Larsen & Toubro. N. Chandrababu Naidu developed a slogan of "Bye Bye Bangalore" and "Hello Hyderabad" during his tenure and worked hard to bring International companies like Microsoft, CA Technologies, Deloitte and went on to create Vision 2020. Naidu persuaded Bill Gates to establish a Microsoft development center in Hyderabad, making it the only Microsoft development center outside the USA at that time. He also worked diligently to bring biotechnology companies to Hyderabad, developing Genome Valley, a high-end technology park commissioned in 1999 as S. P. Biotech Park. This was done through a public-private partnership with Bharat Biotech International and its founder, Krishna Ella, along with private infrastructure companies like Shapoorji Pallonji Group and ICICI Bank. During his tenure, N. Chandrababu Naidu also created master plans for an international airport and an outer ring road. D. E. Shaw & Co. was the first multinational company to open its office in Hyderabad in 1996.

== Financial District ==
Financial District is an IT, real estate and architectural suburb, spread across Nanakramguda and Gachibowli, Hyderabad. WaveRock is a 2.5 million square feet (sqft) Information Technology-Special Economic Zone (IT-SEZ) in Nanakramguda spread over 12 acres (approx). WaveRock SEZ houses over 25 IT companies including marquee clients such as Apple, GAP, Accenture, Development Bank of Singapore, DuPont among others, and has close to 25,000 to 30,000 employees working out of the premises. In December 2019, WaveRock was bought by the Shapoorji Pallonji Real Estate Fund (SPREF II) for Rs 1,800 crore from Tishman Speyer.

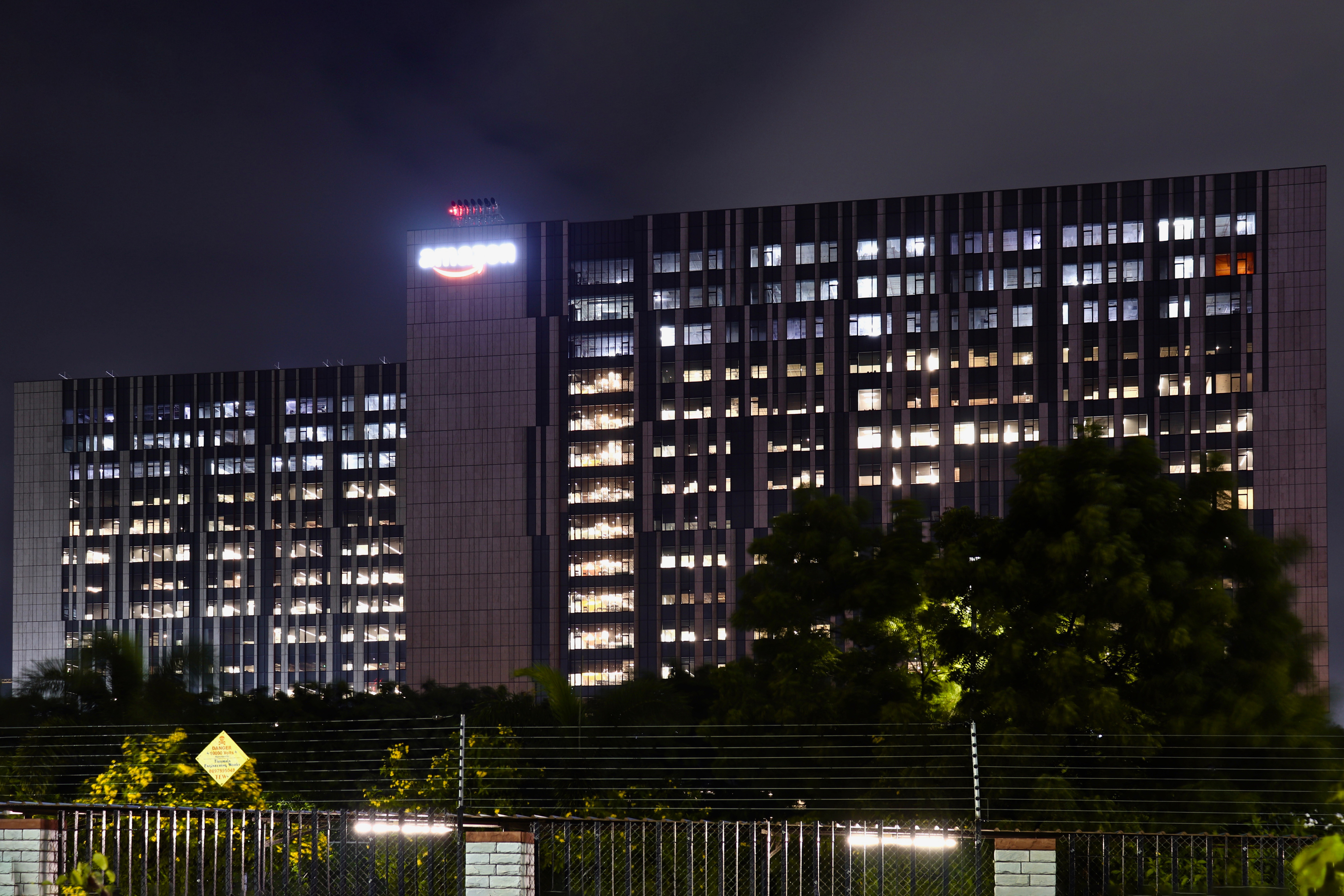
Amazon campus in Financial District

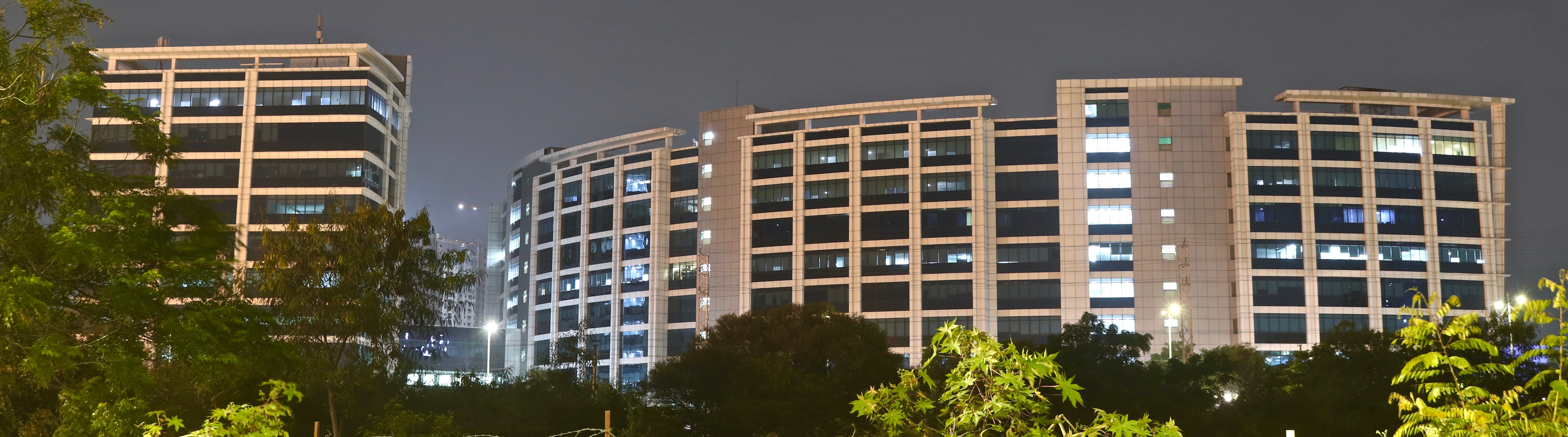
Q-city

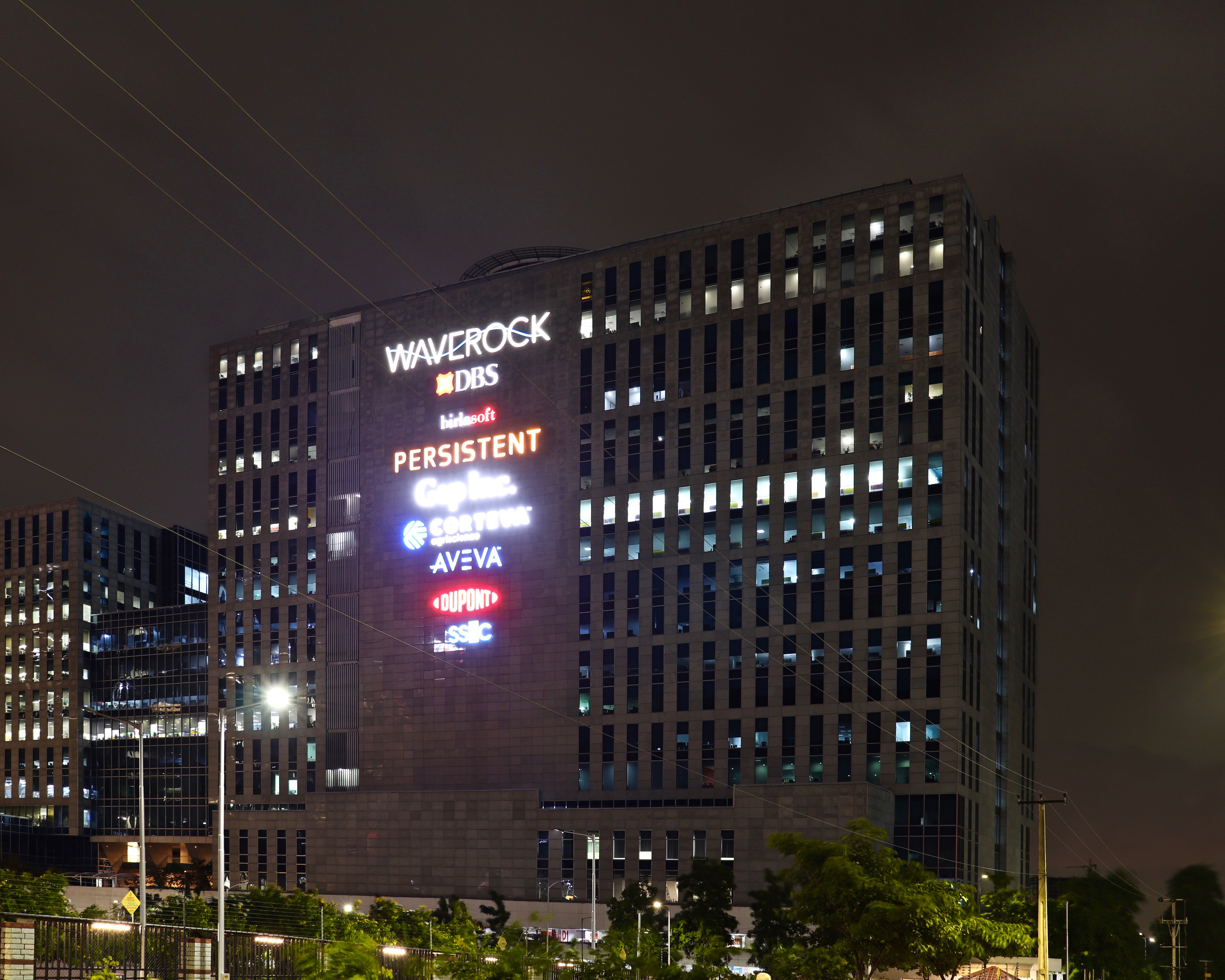
Waverock buildings

== HITEC City ==
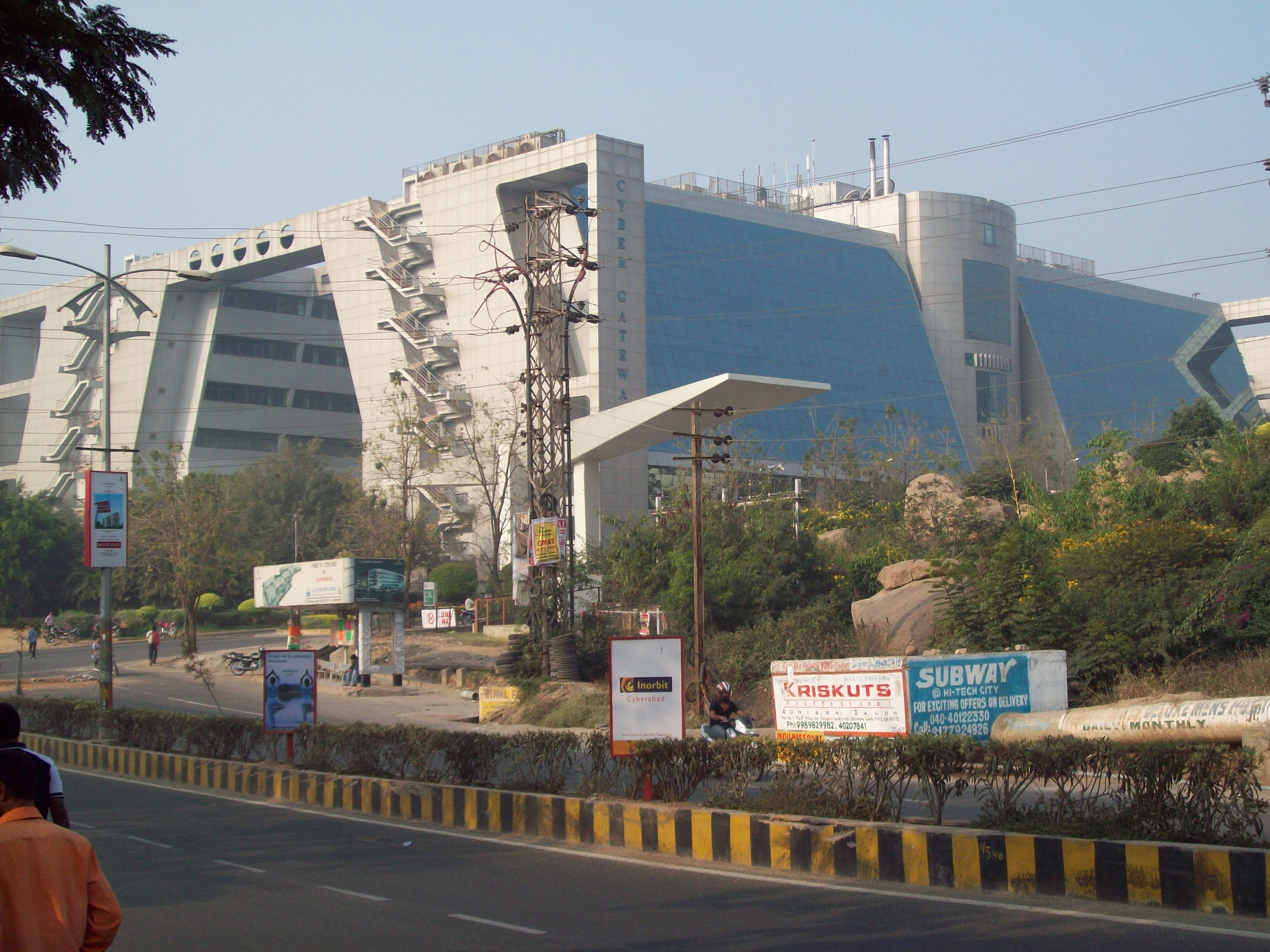
Cyber Gateway Madhapur Hyderabad near Raheja Mindspace

The IT industry initiative of the TDP government, involved setting up Larsen & Toubro in collaboration with the policy maker APIIC. This led to the creation of a special economic zone called Hyderabad Information Technology Engineering Consultancy City, or simply HITEC City. It started the era of software and IT in Hyderabad.

== Salarpuria Sattva Knowledge City ==
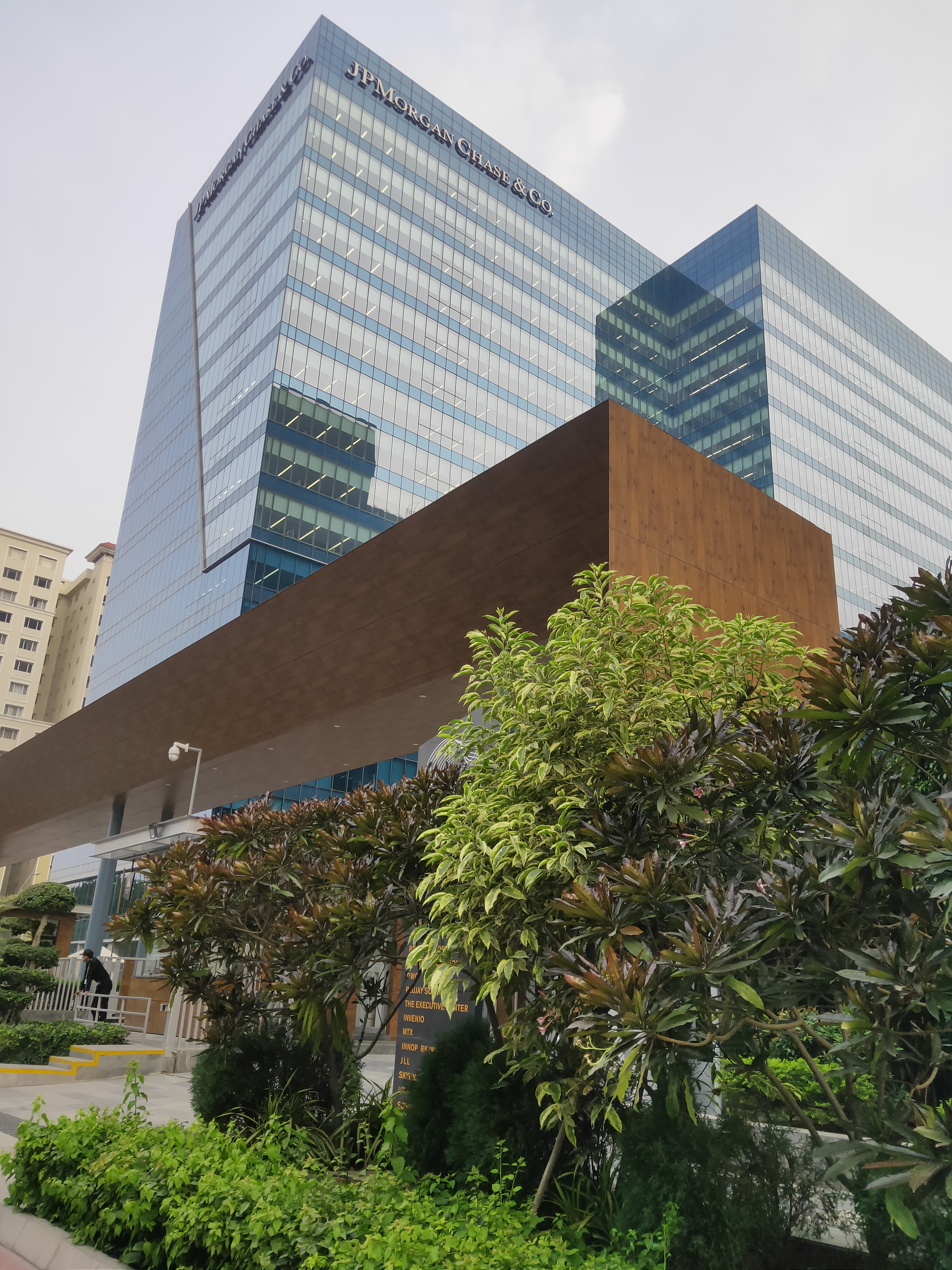
JP Morgan Chase & Co. Tower, Hyderabad

Salarpuria Sattva Knowledge City is a 7.5 million sq ft IT park spread across 30 acres and five megatowers. It is home to global behemoths like JP Morgan, Intel, Microsoft, Goldman Sachs, Novartis Healthcare, Synchrony Financial, AMD and KPMG. The Bengaluru-based builder, Salarpuria Sattva partnered with Blackstone recently to develop a 7 million sq ft IT park in Hyderabad.

== IT industry in districts ==
In February 2016, Telangana Information Technology, Electronics and Communications Minister K. T. Rama Rao laid the foundation stone for IT incubation centre at Madikonda, Warangal. In January 2020, two major companies namely Tech Mahindra and Cyient have inaugurated their campuses employing about 2,000 people. Softpath, Quadrant started their operations in the Warangal IT Tower/Incubation Centre.

Outside of Warangal, the state has set up similar IT hubs in Tier-2 towns and cities like Khammam, Karimnagar, Adilabad, Ramagundam, Mahbubnagar, Nizamabad, Nalgonda, Siddipet, and Suryapet.

== See also ==
- List of companies based in Hyderabad
- The Information Technology Investment Region (ITIR), Hyderabad
- Information technology in India
- List of Indian IT companies
