= Raheja =

Raheja is an Indian surname. Notable people with the surname include:

- Chandru Raheja (born 1941), Indian billionaire businessman
- Dinesh Raheja (born 1957), Indian author, columnist, TV scriptwriter, film historian
- Gloria Goodwin Raheja, American anthropologist
- Lachmandas Raheja, Indian businessman
- Mishal Raheja, Indian actor
- Tushar Raheja (born 1984), Indian storyteller and researcher
