= Meera Shenoy =

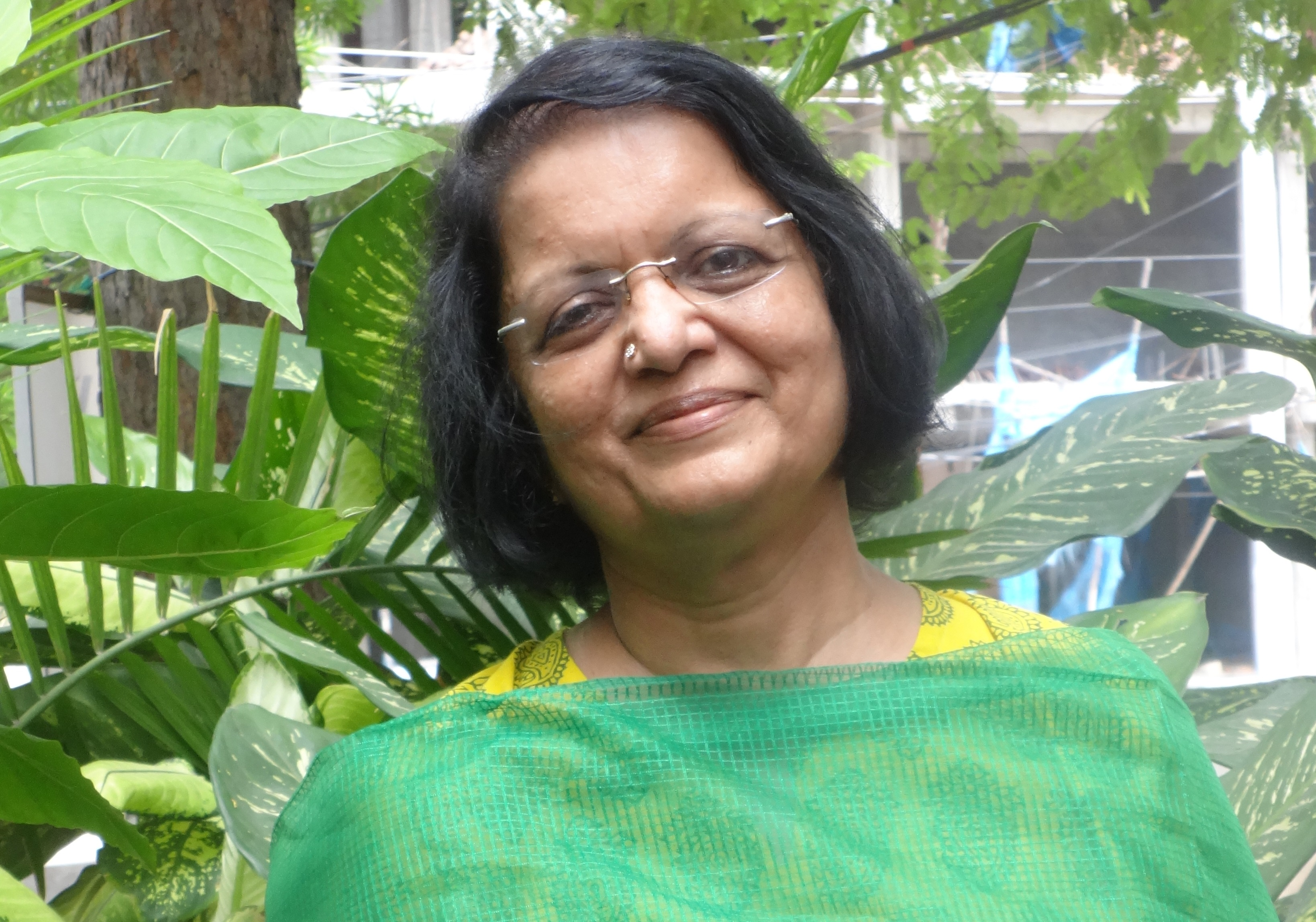
- Born: 4 February; Chennai, Tamil Nadu, India
- Occupation: Social entrepreneur
- Known for: Running training centers for persons with disabilities from rural India
- Title: Founder, CEO
- Board member of: SCPwD, CII
- Spouse(s): Dr. Subodh R, Shenoy
- Children: Suchitra Shenoy (daughter)

Academic background
- Education: University of Hyderabad
- Website: http://www.youth4jobs.org/

Meera Shenoy is founder of Youth4Jobs. She works on policy, both with central and state governments, and has implemented projects in scale. Her recent assignment was Senior Advisor UNDP, Skilling & Employment and supporting Mr. Subramaniam Ramadorai, Advisor to the Prime Minister on Skilling, in his capacity as chairman, NSDA.

== Early life ==
Meera Shenoy was born to a middle-class family in Chennai. Her mother has been an inspiration. One of the first women to get a seat in Vellore Medical College, she had to give up her education to marry an eligible only son. Meera's mother learnt the intricacies of the stock market in the 70s, and grew her small inheritance to ensure little niceties which the three daughters wanted were always given. Growing up in a joint family, she was influenced by her grandfather, a district medical officer in the British rule India, who lived simply but donated generously to the needy.

== Family and personal life ==
She is married to Dr. Subodh R, Shenoy, who is the son of India's first market economist, B. R. Shenoy. She was born in Chennai and grew up in an upper middle class family and her father was an ophthalmologist. She was second of four children and very bright. The family led a value based life and helped those in need.

== Pioneer: Starting & Scaling India’s First Jobs Mission ==
Meera Shenoy began her work in skilling as executive director of EGMM (Employment Generation & Marketing Mission) For the first time, her work made companies realize rural youth can be placed in entry-level jobs when short-term customized training is given. When she left after six years, it had trained 2, 20,000 youth with 70% placements. A unique IT architecture linked to e-payment was put in place for transparency. Her work was featured in Knowledge@Wharton and the Wall Street Journal.

== Consultant, World Bank ==
She then worked as a specialist for the World Bank. In Bihar, she has worked closely with the Jeevika project to support the government in skilling strategy, capacity building of staff and its unique migration initiative. She has given invited talks in national and international forums including addressing students for their convocation.

== Founder, Youth4Jobs ==
Meera Shenoy is founder of Youth4Jobs. Youth4Jobs has a purchasing power parity (PPP) with the Society for Elimination of Rural poverty, Andhra Pradesh government called Centre for Persons with Disabilities'(PwD's) Livelihoods.

For the retail sector, Y4J has co-created a brand called "Pankh" in partnership with TRRAIN founded by B Nagesh, chairman, Retail Association of India. She was commissioned to do the ILO country strategy for disability and labour markets. She has worked with NSDC and Ministry of rural development develop their guidelines for skilling youth with disability.

Meera Shenoy's book of inspirational stories associated with disability supported by Fetzer Institute, was launched at the Jaipur Literary Festival, the largest literary festival in the world. It is in its second edition and a Hindi version has just been published. Opening the very first training center in Hyderabad, Telangana Youth4Jobs was scaled up to 24 cities across 14 states in India.

== Honours and awards ==
Awards include:

- NCPEDP-Shell Helen Keller Award 2011
- Winner of the 2014 Bihar Innovation Forum II Award under Skills Development category
- Invited to speak about Youth4Jobs at the prestigious TEDxBerkeley 2015
- Inducted into the Happiness Hall of Fame 2015 in a function held at Stanford, the only Indian to be inducted at the ceremony.
- Winner of Access Livelihoods Asia 2015 Award. Youth4Jobs also included into the Access Livelihoods Asia Case Study Compendium
- Youth4Jobs was invited to present their case study of best practices at the UN Office in Vienna, Austria at the prestigious Zero Project Conference in 2016 and 2017.
- Youth4Jobs was the double winner of Americares SPIRIT OF HUMANITY Awards in 2016. Y4J was awarded in two categories: Livelihoods and Disability.
- National Award for Empowerment of Persons with Disabilities (Divyangjan)-2017 conferred by the President of India on World Disability Day (3 December 2017)
