= Chandru Raheja =

Indian businessman and billionaire

- Born: Chandru Lachmandas Raheja; 1941 (age 84–85)
- Education: University of Mumbai
- Occupation: Businessman
- Title: CEO, K Raheja Corp
- Spouse: Jyoti C. Raheja
- Children: 2 sons
- Parent: Lachmandas Raheja
- Relatives: Gopal L. Raheja (Brother) Kishore L. Raheja (Brother)

Chandru Lachmandas Raheja (born 1941) is an Sindhi Indian billionaire businessman, and the chairman of K Raheja Corp which is involved in developing IT parks, hotels, malls, and running department store chains including Shoppers Stop.

Raheja led his company to diversify into different businesses ever since the family businesses were split in 1996.

As per Forbes list of India’s 100 richest tycoons, dated OCTOBER 09, 2024, Chandru Raheja is ranked 59th with a net worth of $5.4 Billion.

== Early life ==
Chandru Raheja was born in 1941 in Sindh to a Sindhi Hindu family, the son of Lachmandas Raheja, and has four brothers. He has a bachelor's degree in law from the University of Mumbai. His cousin Rajan Raheja is also a billionaire.

== Career ==
Raheja established his own real estate firm in 1996 when the business was divided into three groups between Gopal Raheja, chairman of K Raheja Constructions, Suresh Raheja, chairman of K Raheja Universal and Chandru Raheja, the chairman of K Raheja Corp, and Shoppers Stop Ltd. In the book India's New Capitalists: Caste, Business, and Industry in a Modern Nation, Harish Damodaran stated that Raheja-owned K Raheja Corp has emerged as the biggest business of the various entities which were formed after the split.

Under Raheja's leadership, K Raheja Corp had made major progress in the residential and commercial real estate space and ventured out into other segments. With the departmental store chain Shoppers Stop, established in 1991 under the banner of K Raheja Corp, the group expanded into building malls like InOrbit in 2004. He guided K Raheja Corp for the development of the brand Mindspace which was dedicated to acquiring land for the construction of IT Parks.

Apart from expanding the company, Raheja has been involved in sustainability through green buildings under the brand Mindspace.

== Personal life ==
Raheja is married to Jyoti C. Raheja, they have two children, Ravi and Neel, and live in Mumbai. Ravi and Neel Raheja are group presidents of K Raheja Corp.
