= Gopal L. Raheja =

Indian billionaire

Gopal Raheja
- گوپال راهيجا
- Born: 1934
- Died: 18 March 2014 (aged 79–80)
- Occupation: Owner of K Raheja constructions
- Father: Lachmandas S. Raheja
- Relatives: Chandru Raheja (brother) Rajan Raheja (cousin)

Gopal L. Raheja (1934-2014) was a Sindhi Indian billionaire businessman.

== Early life ==
Gopal was born in Karachi Sind and studied at Bombay, Sangli and Poona. His brother Chandru Raheja and his cousin Rajan Raheja are also billionaires.

== Career ==
Gopal inherited K Raheja constructions from his father Lachmandas S. Raheja. Raheja was known for several residential developments in central Mumbai. The group is one of the biggest private landowners in Mumbai. Raheja and his group had completed 2000 construction projects across India. He was also the co-founder of S L Raheja Hospital, L S Raheja School of Architecture & Arts, L S Raheja College of Arts & Commerce, and L S Raheja Technical Institute. At the time of his death Gopal was worth Rs. 11,000 crore (approximately $1.8 billion).
