= HyperCity =

Indian supermarket chain

- Type: Hypermarket
- Industry: Retailing
- Founded: 2006; 20 years ago
- Headquarters: Mumbai, Maharashtra, India
- Area served: India
- Parent: Future Group

HyperCity (styled HyperCITY) was a supermarket chain which operates 20 stores throughout India as of today. The main area of focus is food, home, and fashion.

== History ==
Founded in 2006, HyperCity Retail India Ltd. was part of the K Raheja Corp, which also owns Shoppers Stop. HyperCity opened its first large-format hypermarket in Malad, Mumbai, spanning over 120,000 square feet and stocking a wide array of products including groceries, food, home needs, apparel, and consumer durables.

In 2017, Future Group acquired HyperCity for ₹655 crore. Following its acquisition by Future Retail, HyperCity's operations became deeply entangled in the parent group's subsequent financial collapse and debt defaults.

== See also ==
- List of hypermarkets in India
