= Government Vellore Medical College =

College in Tamil Nadu, India

Coordinates: 12.843551°N 79.135627°E

Government Vellore Medical College Hospital
- Motto: Learn to Heal
- Type: Medical college and hospital
- Established: 2005; 21 years ago
- Affiliations: The Tamil Nadu Dr. M.G.R. Medical University
- Dean: Dr. Rohini Devi
- Undergraduates: 100
- Postgraduates: 50+
- Location: Vellore, Tamil Nadu, India
- Campus: Urban
- Nickname: GVMCians
- Website: https://velloremedicalcollege.in/

Government Vellore Medical College (GVMC) or Government Vellore Medical College Hospital (GVMCH) is a National Medical Commission recognised medical college located at Adukkamparai, Vellore city in Tamil Nadu. It is about 8 km from Vellore Town Bus Terminus. Established in 2005, it is a relatively new medical college in Tamil Nadu offering an NMC recognised Bachelor of Medicine, Bachelor of Surgery (MBBS), MD in General Medicine/ Anesthesiology /Emergency Medicine/ Dermatology/ Pediatrics and MS- General Surgery/ ENT/ Ophthalmology/ Orthopedics / obstetrics and gynaecology and Mch - Neurosurgery (3 years).

== History ==
The hospital site had previously hosted a tuberculosis sanatorium, when plans for starting the college began in 1997. The college began admitting students in 2005. The medical college is affiliated to the Tamil Nadu Dr. M.G.R. Medical University.

== Admissions ==
Every year, students are admitted through a counselling process conducted by The Directorate of Medical Education, Tamil Nadu. Total number of students admitted per year are 100, with 15% of seats reserved for admissions through all India quota.

== Popularity ==
GVMC has been listed in top ten emerging medical colleges in India, by a survey conducted by India Today. GVMC is ranked 6 among top ten colleges.

== Services ==
Special investigative facilities available in the hospital are magnetic resonance imaging, X-ray computed tomography, echocardiography, and cardiac stress test. Other available services are comprehensive emergency maternal and obstetrics and neonatal care, anti-retroviral therapy and an integrated counselling testing centre, Neonatal Intensive Care Unit, Pediatric Intensive Care Unit, Tamil Nadu Accident and Emergency Initiative.

== Notable alumni ==
- Meera Shenoy
