= Industrial Policy Frame work for State of Telangana 2014 =

The Industrial Policy Framework for the State of Telangana recognizes that Industrialization is recognized as a key source of the economic growth and development of the Indian state of Telangana. This framework came into force on 1 December 2014.

== Vision ==
The stated vision for industrialization is: "Research to Innovation, Innovation to Industry and Industry to prosperity." The policy encompasses fourteen thrust areas with a plan to develop six industrial corridors and common infrastructure. The cornerstone to the policy is zero graft and zero corruption - in pursuit of a secure and progressive business environment. While large companies such as ITC, Tata Motors and Mahindra are planning to expand their business in the newly developed state(s), this policy has also gained significance in the investment community.

== History ==
On 5 May 2011 the Andhra Pradesh administration introduced guidelines to drive industrial promotion in the state. This policy was successful in attracting corporations such as PEPSI and the Siri City project. This also boosted the growth of the service sector in Hyderabad, transforming it into anIT logistics hub. After bifurcation, both states sought investments that could increase employment and standard living. Telangana's policy framework was introduced on 27 November 2014 and came into effect on 1 December 2014. Telangana govt sets a record with new industrial policy and clears 17 projects worth Rs 1500 crore within 15 days of the launch.

== Core values ==
- Facilitate industrial growth
- Increase employment rates.
- Inclusively facilitate social equality
- Marginally effect the socially disadvantaged sections

=== Minimum inspection and maximum facilitation ===
Each industrial unit is to be inspected once every nine months; as established in advance. Occasional random inspections may occur with written permission of the department manager. Maximum facilitation encompasses an effective system beyond a single window anchor. Self-certification and automatic renewal will be encouraged along with an online E-Helpline system.

=== Single-window mechanism ===
Main article: TS-iPASS

The industrial clearance system shall be beyond a single-window system, and shall be called Telangana State Industrial Project Approval and Self-Certification System (TS-iPASS). This operates at three levels: very large projects, large industries and SMEs.

== Thrust areas ==
Core Sectors Include:

- Life Sciences
- IT hardware including bio-medical devices, electronics, and cellular communication
- Precision engineering including aviation and aerospace
- Food processing
- Automobiles, tractors and farm equipment
- Textiles and apparels
- Plastics and polymers
- Fast-moving consumer goods and domestic appliances
- Engineering and capital goods
- Gems and jewelry
- Waste management and green technologies
- Renewable energy and solar parks
- Mine-based and wood-based industries
- Transportation, logistic hub, and inland ports

=== Special support ===
The proportion of entrepreneurs among the Scheduled Castes/Scheduled Tribes and women population is very low. Policies like TS-PRIDE shall be implemented to encourage Dalit entrepreneurs.
