= HomeStop =

Home furnishing store in Mumbai

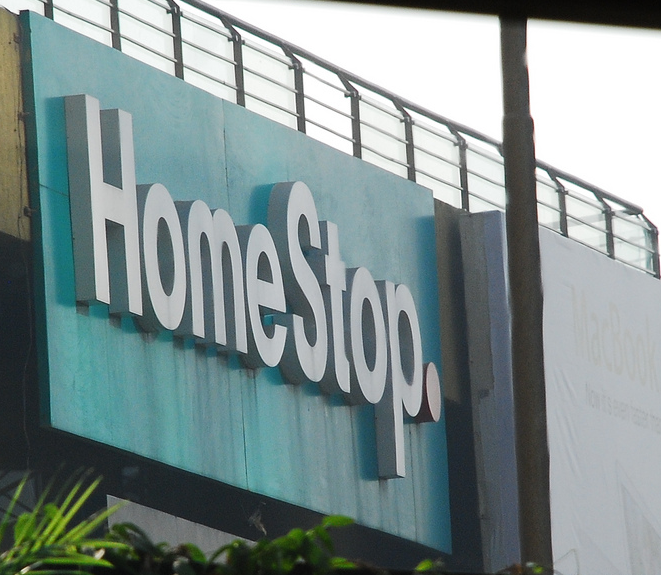
- Industry: Retail
- Founded: 2005; 20 years ago in Mumbai
- Number of locations: 15
- Area served: India
- Products: Home furnishings
- Website: corporate.shoppersstop.com/Brand/Homestop.aspx

HomeStop is a home furnishing store based in Mumbai that offers home products such as decor, furniture, and accessories. HomeStop is part of the Shoppers Stop department chain, Goods sold are often imported.

== Products ==
Homestop carries products from domestic and international brands. Products available include home decor & furnishings, modular kitchens, and health equipment.

== Store Locations ==
HomeStop is currently located in 15 Indian cities including Bengaluru, Coimbatore, Mumbai, Delhi, Navi Mumbai and Chennai

== See also ==
- List of department stores by country
- Department store
