= Gloria Goodwin Raheja =

American anthropologist

Gloria Goodwin Raheja is American anthropologist who specializes in ethnographic history. She is the author of several historical works where she explores the concepts of caste and gender in India, colonialism, politics of representation, blues music, capitalism in the Appalachia and other diverse topics. Raheja argues that caste stratification in India was influenced by British colonialism. Monographs on ethnographic history and India have been considered "acclaimed" by the Journal of the Royal Anthropological Institute.

She is professor in the College of Liberal Arts at the University of Minnesota.

== Education ==
Raheja attended Chatham College, graduating in 1971 with a bachelor's in anthropology. She received her master's degree from the University of Chicago in 1976 and also earned her PhD from the same institution in 1985. Between 1993 and 1997, she was the Chair of the Department of Anthropology at the University of Minnesota. She was also the Director of the Institute for Global Studies at the University of Minnesota between 1998 and 2001.

== Career ==
Raheja is the author of the book The Poison of the Gift, a village ethnography. According to a review by Declan Quigley, Reheja has "established herself as a force to be reckoned with in the anthropological study of Hindu society."

She has written the book Listen to the Heron's Words : Reimagining Gender and Kinship in North India with Ann Grodzins Gold. Listen to the Heron's Words analyzes songs of women from the rural mountain regions of Uttar Pradesh and Rajasthan which turn up an alternative morality relating to women's concepts of kinship and gender roles. Songs, Stories, Lives: Gendered Dialogues and Cultural Critique studies the "social dynamics in the songs and folktales" of India.

She is currently working on a book titled Logan County Blues: Frank Hutchison in the Sonic Landscape of the Appalachian Coalfield and analyzes the music of coal miners in Appalachia in relation to the economic and environmental transformations that occurred in the late nineteenth centuries. Frank Hutchison, the first white guitarist to record blues, will be featured in this book.

A 2nd book in progress is Scandalous Traductions: Landscape, History, Memory and is a combination of ethnographic history, memoir, and poetry in Appalachian coal mining counties.

== Awards ==
- 2006 - National Endowment for the Humanities Award for participation in NEH Institute on Appalachian studies
- 1996 - American Philosophical Society Fellowship
- 1993 - McKnight Research Award
- 1986 - Marc Perry Galler Prize for Most Distinguished Dissertation in the Division of the Social Sciences, University of Chicago

== Publications ==
The following books have been published by Gloria Goodwin Raheja:

- 2003 Songs, Stories, Lives: Gendered Dialogues and Cultural Critique
- 1994 Listen to the Heron's Words: Reimagining Gender and Kinship in North India
- 1988 The Poison in the Gift: Ritual, Prestation, and the Dominant Caste in a North Indian Village

She is also the author of the following articles:

- 1988 Caste, Kingship, and Dominance Reconsidered Annual Review of Anthropology Volume 17. pp 497– 522
- 1989 Centrality, Mutuality, and Hierarchy: Shifting Aspects of Intercaste Relationships in North India. Contributions to Indian Sociology (N.S.) 23:79-101
- 1993 Caste Ideologies, Protest, and the Power of the Dominant Caste Social Analysis 34:17-33.
- 1996 The Limits of Patriliny: Kinship, Gender, and Women’s Speech Practices in Rural North India In M.J. Maynes et al. eds., Gender, Kinship, Power: A Comparative and Interdisciplinary History. pp. 149–174. New York and London: Routledge.
- 1996 Caste, Colonialism, and the Speech of the Colonized: Entextualization and Disciplinary Control in India. American Ethnologist 23(3):494-513
- 1997 Negotiated Solidarities: Gendered Perspectives on Disruption and Desire in North Indian Expressive Traditions and Popular Culture. Oral Tradition 12(1):173-225.
- 1999 The Ajaib-Ghar and the Gun Zam-Zammah: Colonial Cartographies and the Elusive Politics of 'Tradition' in the Literature of the Survey of India South Asia Research 19(1):29-51.
- 1999 Colonial Subjects: Essays on the Practical History of Anthropology
- 2010 A Splendid Thing for the Empire: Some Reflections on Ethnography and Entextualization in Colonial India In Karen Isaksen Leonard, Gayatri Reddy, and Ann Grodzins Gold, eds. Histories of Intimacy and Situated Ethnography. New Delhi: Manohar Publishers. pp. 259–304.
- 2016 Ethnography Above the Coal Measures Anthropology and Humanism 41(2). pp. 212–213.
- 2016 You Can Tell the Company We Done Quit: The Destruction and Reconfiguration of Trust in the Appalachian Coalfields in the Early Twentieth Century In Trusting and its Tribulations: Interdisciplinary Engagements with Intimacy, Sociality and Trust, edited by Vigdis Broch-Due and Margit Ystanes. New York: Berghahn. pp. 235–257.
- 2017 Hear the Tale of the Famine Year’: Famine Policy, Oral Traditions, and the Recalcitrant Voice of the Colonized in Nineteenth-Century India Oral Tradition 41(2).
