= Retailers Association of India =

Indian trade association

- Abbreviation: RAI
- Formation: 2004; 21 years ago
- Type: Non-governmental trade association
- Purpose: Policy advocacy
- Headquarters: Mumbai, India
- Location: India
- Fields: Retail
- CEO: Kumar Rajagopalan
- Chairman: Bijou Kurien
- Vice Chairman: Kulin Sanjay Lalbhai
- Website: rai.net.in

Retailers Association of India (RAI) is an Indian retail trade association. A not-for-profit organization, it represents the rights of Indian retailers. Its members include chain store retailers, independent retailers, e-commerce retailers and retail service providers across India. RAI is involved with retail advocacy, organizing conferences, knowledge-sharing initiatives and training programs.

As of 2021, the association represents 500,000 stores across the nation. It has requested the Government of Maharashtra to allow malls and shopping centres in Maharashtra to operate with the necessary precautions to save employment and improve the economy.

== Affiliations ==
RAI is a member of the Federation of International Retail Associations (FIRA), National Retail Federation, US, which enables knowledge sharing and transfer of international standards and best practice into the Indian retail sector.

RAI works with Trust for Retailers and Retail Associates of India (TRRAIN) to engage the industry and to celebrate Retail Employees Day on 12 December.
