= K Raheja Corp =

Indian Real Estate Developer

- Industry: Real estate
- Founded: 1956
- Founder: Chandru Lalchand Raheja
- Headquarters: Mumbai, Maharashtra India
- Area served: India
- Key people: Ravi Chandru Raheja, Neel Chandru Raheja
- Products: Residential; Commercial; Hospitality; Malls
- Website: krahejaprojects.com

K Raheja Corp is a property developer in India with interests in commercial and residential projects, malls and hospitality across multiple cities in the country. It owns the brands Mindspace, Commerzone, Crossword Bookstores and Shoppers Stop, and is the second largest commercial developer in India. Under the Mindspace banner, K Raheja Corp also operates Mindspace Office Parks, which is a real estate investment trust (REIT).

== History ==
Founded in 1956 by Chandru Raheja, K Raheja Corp was formed after a split between Raheja brothers as a separate group.

== Businesses ==
=== Commercial Real Estate ===
K Raheja Corp operates its commercial business under the brands Mindspace and Commerzone with projects in Mumbai, Hyderabad, Pune and Chennai. As of 2017, K Raheja Corp had 20 million square feet (1.9 million m^{2}) of office space, making it the second largest commercial developer in the country. The real estate group is leading the process of buying Citi Centre, a 100,000 sq ft (9,300 m^{2}) commercial property in Bandra Kurla Complex, Mumbai, which housed the headquarters of Citibank.

=== Residential ===
The residential business of K Raheja Corp spans multiple projects in Mumbai, Pune and Hyderabad. The group has commenced luxurious residential projects like Artesia and Vivarea in Mumbai, and have developed other luxury projects in Mumbai, Pune and Hyderabad.

=== Hospitality ===
The group's hospitality business is focused on hotels and convention centres for business and leisure needs. K Raheja Corp promotes Chalet Hotels – a high end hotel chain in India with established global brands such as Sheraton (Starwood Hotels and Resorts), Westin and JW Marriott. In 2017, the Group declared plans to invest ₹ 3000 crores over 4–5 years to double its current portfolio of 2,800 rooms, and touch other tier 1 cities like Bengalaru, Goa, NCR and Pune.

=== Retail ===
Multi-brand lifestyle store Shoppers Stop and its subsidiary bookstore company Crosswords are part of K Raheja Corp. The ₹5,113 crore company Shoppers Stop has currently been reviving its model to improve profit in its businesses to compete with online marketplaces.

Founded in 2006, HyperCity Retail India Ltd. was part of the K Raheja Corp, which also owns Shoppers Stop. In 2017, Future Group acquired HyperCity for ₹655 crore.

=== Shopping Malls ===
K Raheja runs Inorbit mall which is present in Hyderabad, Mumbai, and Vadodara.

=== Power Distribution ===
K Raheja Corp invested in clean energy, it has gone partial green by installing Solar roof top plant at Mindspace Business Park, Madhapur, Hyderabad in September 2016. The total installed capacity of the plant is 1.6MW which is considered one of the largest solar roof top plants in Telangana. The plant has helped the environment & will continue to do so till useful life of the plant.

== See also ==
- Chandru Raheja
- Raheja Mindspace
- Real estate
