= B. S. Nagesh =

- Born: 12 April 1959 (age 67); Bangalore, Karnataka, India
- Education: Benaras Hindu University
- Occupation: Businessman
- Title: Founder of the Trust for Retailers and Retail Associates of India
- Spouse: Shailaja Nagesh
- Children: 2

B. S. Nagesh (born 12 April 1959) is an Indian businessman and the founder of the Trust for Retailers and Retail Associates of India (TRRAIN). He is the chairman of the department store chain Shoppers Stop, having been with the company since its inception in 1991. He has been the guiding force since the opening of the first store in Andheri, Mumbai, and the chain now has 74 stores in 35 cities across India.

== Career ==
Commencing his career in 1982 with Blow Plast Ltd - the manufacturers of VIP luggage and Leo toys, Nagesh has also worked with Orson sales Ltd (1986-1988) and Carona Ltd (1988-1991). He joined the K. Raheja Group in 1991 as a general manager, to set up the Group's retail business. He subsequently went on to be the managing director and CEO of Shoppers Stop from 1997 to 2009. He is the chairman at Shoppers Stop. Nagesh was the founder chairman of Retailers Association of India.

== Awards and recognition ==
- 'One among the Top 33 Indians driving philanthropic initiatives in India' as per an article by Economic Times.
- 'Most admired Apparel Retail Professional of the Year' at the inaugural Images Fashion Awards 2000.
- 'Top CEO Award 2001' instituted by Institute of Marketing Management.
- Inducted into the Retail Hall of Fame at the World Retail Congress in 2008.
