= Crossword Bookstores =

Chain of bookstores in India

Crossword Bookstores Ltd.
- Type: Subsidiary
- Industry: Retail
- Founded: 1992
- Headquarters: Mumbai, India
- Parent: K Raheja Corp
- Website: www.crossword.in

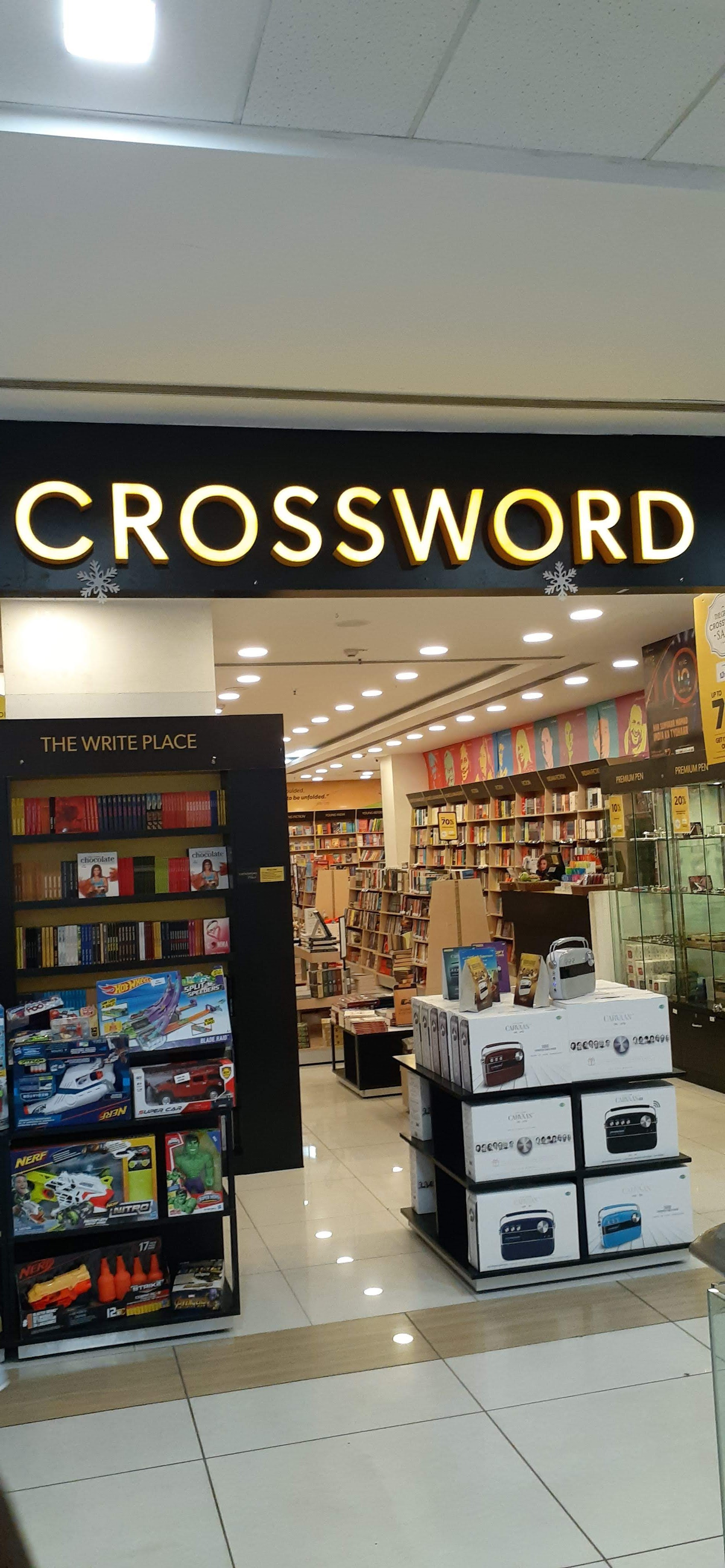
Crossword Bookstores, in Chennai, Tamil Nadu, India

Crossword Bookstores Ltd. is an Indian chain of bookstores headquartered in Pune. As of today, Crossword has stores in more than 40 cities, Amritsar, Ahmedabad, Bhopal, Bengaluru, Chennai, Delhi, Gandhinagar, Goa, Hyderabad, Indore, Jaipur, Kochi, Kohima, Kolkata, Kanpur, Kozhikode, Lucknow, Mangalore, Mumbai, Thane, Navi Mumbai, Noida, Kalyan, Nagpur, Nashik, Raipur, Ranchi, Siliguri, Surat, Silicon Oasis , Thiruvananthapuram, Udaipur, and Vadodara. The chain also founded and sponsors the Crossword Book Award.

The first bookstore opened on October 15, 1992, in Kemps Corner, Mumbai. In 2005, Crossword became a wholly owned subsidiary of Shopper's Stop Ltd.

Crossword has received wide recognition for its achievement. The Advertising Age magazine named Crossword one of the Marketing Superstars for 1994. The Bookseller has described it as "being on the cutting edge of retailing" in India.
