= Hyderabadi pearls =

Pearls from the city of Hyderabad, India

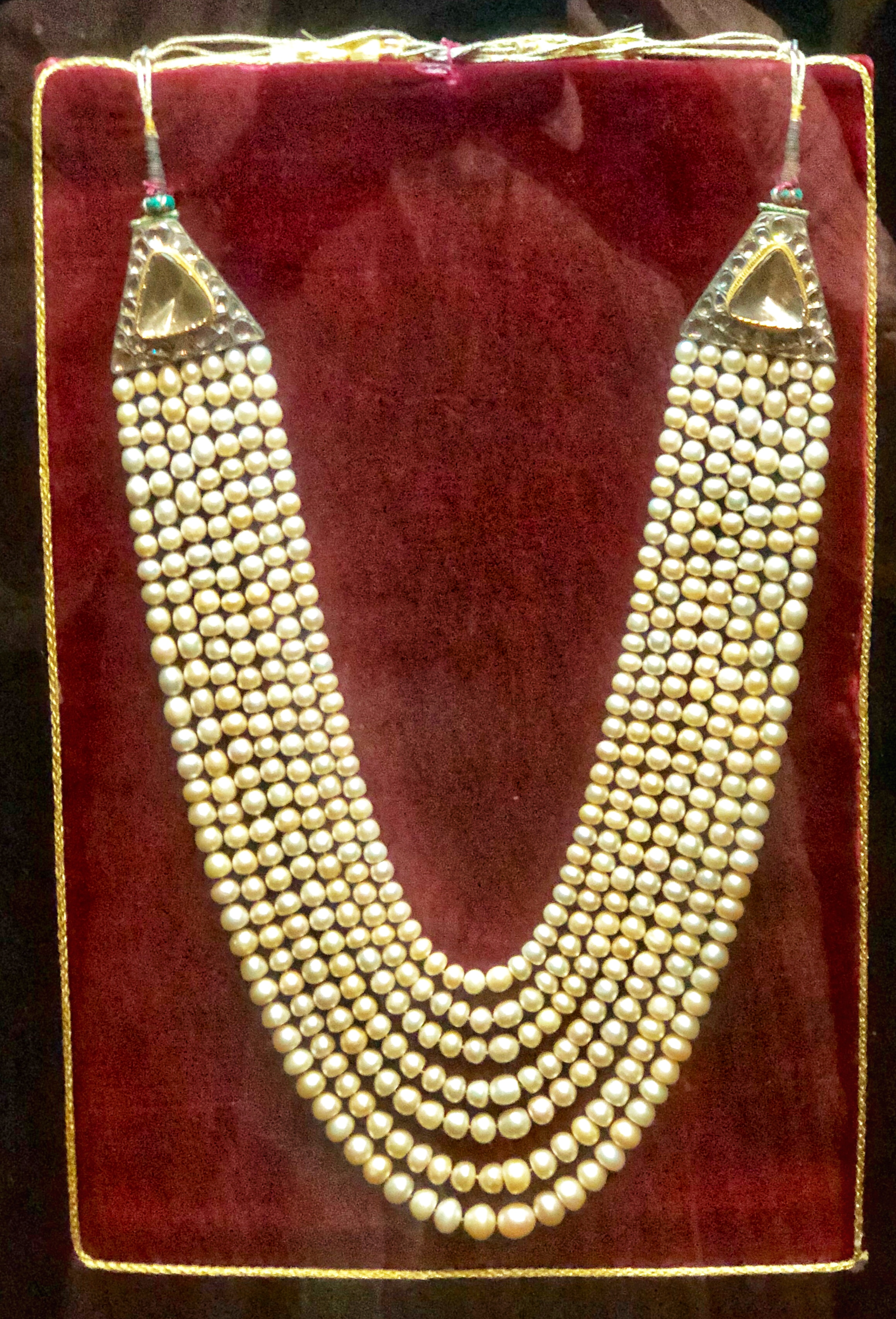
A Satlada is a traditional Hyderabadi necklace which can contain more than 400 pearls

Hyderabad is considered the main pearl trading centre in India, because of which the city is also known as the "City of Pearls". The most notable area devoted to the trade is the village called Chandanpet just outside Hyderabad, wherein almost the entire population is engaged in the delicate art of drilling pearls, a skill they have practiced for generations. This practice also makes the city one of the largest pearl drilling locations in India.

== Background ==
The pearl industry in Hyderabad flourished due to the patronage of the Qutub Shahi kings and the Asaf Jahis, who were said to have an affinity for sparkling jewels. The pearls were not only part of the traditional regalia of this royal clientele but the pearls' crushed form are also believed to have healing and beautifying properties. Princesses were said to be weighed against their pearls during their birthdays while Mir Osman Ali Khan, who is considered the richest among the Nizams, was said to have hoarded sacks of pearls in the basement of his palaces.

Prior to the pearl trade in Hyderabad, pearls were sourced from Basra, Iraq. The pearls from this city were prized for its hardness unlike those found in the Bay of Bengal, which are softer and, thus, less durable. However, the discovery of oil and the later establishment of the oil industry polluted the Persian Gulf, led to the decline of pearl trade in Basra. Henceforth, pearl merchants gravitated towards Hyderabad. Many pearl artisans from Basra have also moved to Hyderabad centuries ago.

== Processing ==
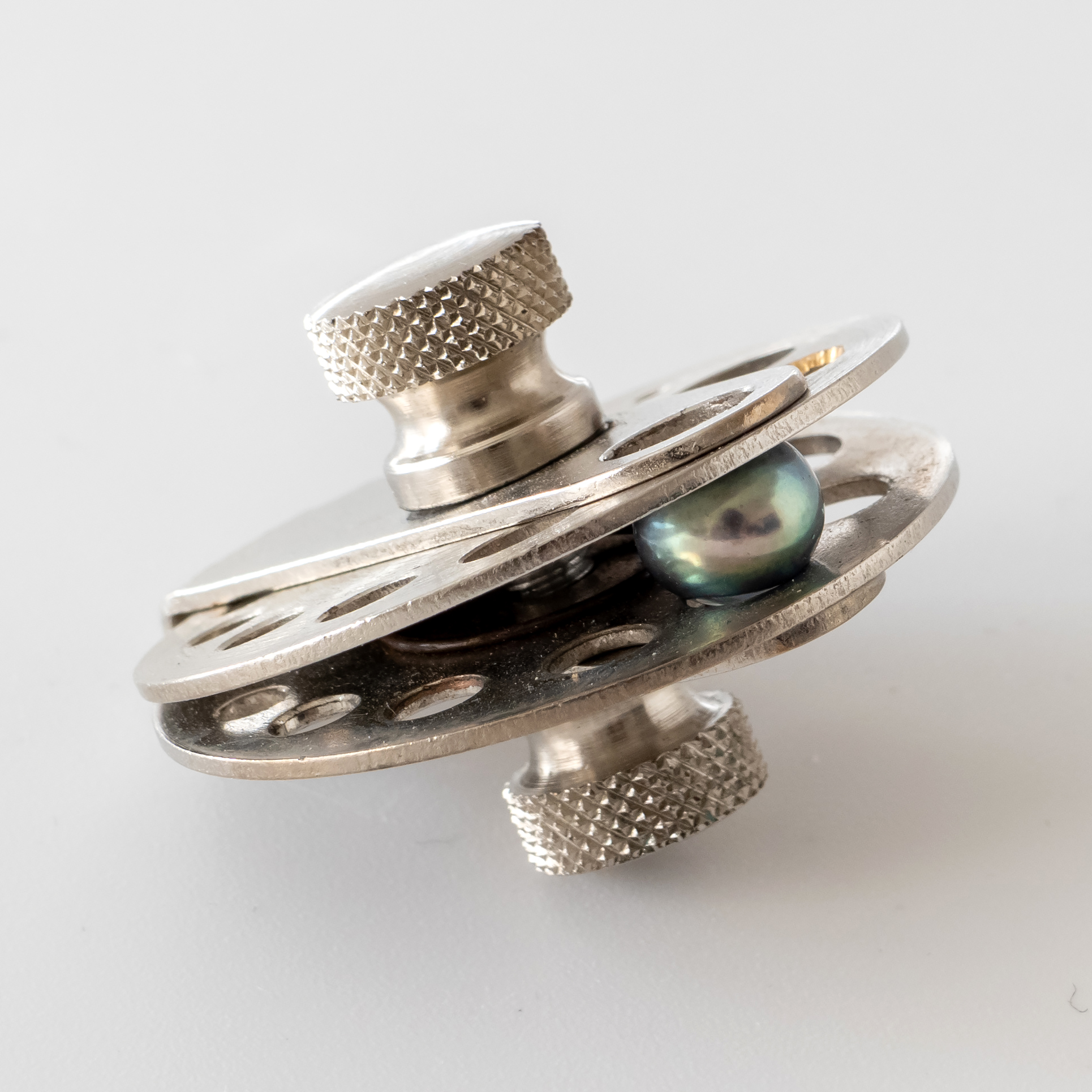
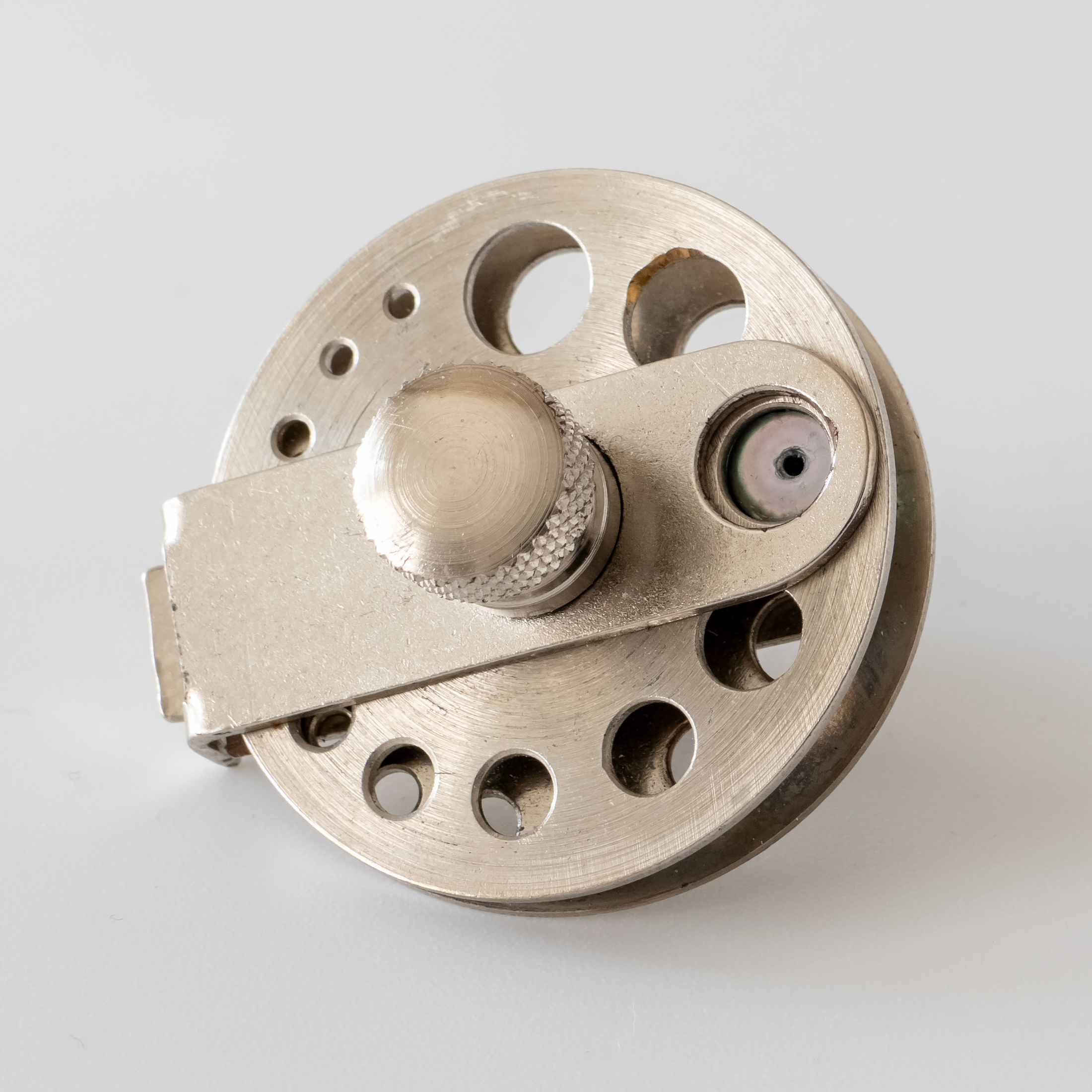
Pearl drilling clamp, a jewelry tool, for pearls of different sizes. A peacock-colored pearl is held in it and drilled.

Once the pearls are drilled, they are boiled for about four days to bleach them and rid them of their dark color. They are placed in glass bottles containing hydrogen peroxide, water, and ether. Then they are sunned for four or five days in glass sun boxes with a mirror base. Finally they are washed and separated through series of different shapes and sizes.

Pearls are also graded according to color. While pink pearls and black pearls are also considered to be of good quality, white pearls have traditionally been most popular. A good quality white pearl reflects a lovely sky blue color under ultraviolet light while a poor quality one has a green or mustard-colored sheen. Black pearls that have a green sheen and baroque (irregular shaped) pearls that reflect a rainbow of colors are also amongst the more valuable varieties. While black and pink pearls are also rare and beautiful, most traditional Hyderabad jewellery is made with white pearls.

Recently, several pearl makers are exporting processed pearls to markets in Europe and the US. With the capital that they gain from this marketing, they are able to purchase machinery for advanced refinement. In particular, equipment that uses enzymes present in thermophiles is able to substantially improve the process of refining pearls.
