= Adukkamparai =

Town in Tamil Nadu, India

Coordinates: 12.848708°N 79.136145°E

Adukkamparai is a small town in Vellore City. Vellore district, Tamil Nadu, India. It is situated on the Vellore to Cuddalore highway (8.9 km) from Vellore.. There is a government hospital and medical college located at Adukkamparai.
