= Ann Grodzins Gold =

American anthropology (born 1946)

Ann Gold
- Citizenship: American
- Education: University of Chicago
- Known for: Indology; South Asian Studies
- Awards: American Association for the Advancement of Science Fellow (2025); Guggenheim Fellowship (2014)
- Scientific career
- Fields: Anthropology
- Workplaces: Syracuse University; Cornell University
- Website: Official Website

Ann Grodzins Gold is the Thomas J. Watson Professor Emerita of Religion and Professor of Anthropology at Syracuse University. Gold is known for her research on ethnographic engagement with religion and culture in provincial North India.

== Career ==
Gold attended University of Chicago where she earned B.A., M.A., and PhD. in anthropology. She spent eight years at Cornell University and joined the faculty at Syracuse University in 1993, until her retirement. In 2011, she was named the Thomas J. Watson Professor of Religion.

== Awards ==
In 2011, Gold was awarded the Fulbright-Hays Faculty Research Abroad Fellowship, enabling her to live in Jahazpur during the 2010-11 academic year. She was awarded the Guggenheim Fellowship in 2014. Gold was also named the fellow of the National Humanities Center in 2014.

In 2025, she was elected as Fellow of the American Association for the Advancement of Science.

== Books ==
- Fruitful Journeys: The Ways of Rajasthani Pilgrims (1988 & 2000) Waveland Press.
- Listen to the Heron's Words: Reimagining Gender and Kinship in North India (1994 ) University of California Press
- In the Time of Trees and Sorrows: Nature, Power, and Memory in Rajasthan (2002). Duke University Press
- Shiptown: Between Rural and Urban North India (2017) University of Pennsylvania Press.
