= Christian Chamber of Commerce and Industry =

Indian business organisation

Christian Chamber of Commerce and Industry is an organisation of Christian businesspeople in India. It was set up in 2010 to act as platform for Christian businesspeople so that they may benefit from networking and achieving a higher rate of growth. Its headquarters is in Hyderabad, India.
