= Microsoft India (R&D) Pvt Ltd =

Microsoft was established in 1996, and is the largest campus of Microsoft in India. It houses Microsoft's biggest research and development facility outside the United States. Microsoft's offices in India are in Hyderabad, Bangalore, Delhi, Pune and Mumbai.

== Building ==
Microsoft's campus in Hyderabad is spread over an area of 54 acres.
