= Lachmandas Raheja =

Indian businessman

Lachmandas S. Raheja
- Occupation: businessman

Lachmandas S. Raheja was an Sindhi Indian businessman.

Lachmandas Raheja founded the K. Raheja Group in 1956. He had three sons. Gopal L. Raheja (died March 2014) who owned K. Raheja Constructions and K. Raheja Hospitality, Chandru Raheja owns K. Raheja Corp and Shoppers Stop and Suresh Raheja owns K. Raheja Universal.

The L S Raheja School of Architecture in Bandra, Mumbai is named after him.
