= Recykal =

Indian digital technology company

- Company type: Private
- Industry: Waste management, Recycling
- Founded: 2016
- Founder: Abhay Deshpande
- Number of locations: 4 (Hyderabad, Mumbai, Pune, Bangalore)
- Website: www.recykal.com

Recykal is a digital technology company based in Hyderabad, Telangana, India, specializing in waste management and recycling. It was founded in 2016 by Abhay Deshpande, Abhishek Deshpande, Ekta Narain, Vikram Prabakar, and Anirudha Jalan.

== History ==
In 2017, Recykal launched its marketplace platform to connect waste collection centers with recyclers. By 2018, the platform enabled the recycling of over 30,000 metric tons (33,000 short tons) of plastic waste across 25 states in India, preventing the waste from reaching landfills.

In 2019, Recykal shifted towards a B2B model, providing services for brands to streamline their Extended Producer Responsibility (EPR) registration, compliance, and fulfillment processes. EPR mandates that producers are responsible for the entire lifecycle of their products, including disposal and recycling.

By 2020, Recykal expanded its services to over 30 states and union territories in India, collecting and recycling over 200,000 metric tons (220,000 short tons) of waste by 2021. The company was honored with the 3R Award for Excellence in Waste Management. In 2022, the company received the Digital India Award for implementing India's first digital deposit refund system (DRS) in Uttarakhand. Recykal was also recognized with Tech4Good Awards.

The company was recognized as a Tech Pioneer by the World Economic Forum in 2022 and was included in the Fortune Change the World 2023 list. The Economic Times named Recykal India's No. 1 Growth Champion in 2023. Google featured Recykal in a case study titled "CircularNet: How Recykal built Asia’s largest circular economy marketplace using Google AI" in 2023.

By 2023, the company channelled over 1 million metric tons (1.1 million short tons) of waste and collaborated with over 620 brands, 675 recyclers, 12,000 businesses, and 5,000 service providers and aggregators. Recykal prevented 12 billion plastic bottles, over 100,000 metric tons (110,000 short tons) of metal, and 90,000 metric tons (99,000 short tons) of paper and e-waste from reaching landfills.

In 2024, Recykal was featured in the FT High-Growth Companies Asia-Pacific list and recognized as the Most Trusted Brand of 2024–25. It was named one of the Top 10 Climate Innovators by the Indo-Pacific Economic Framework for Prosperity.

=== Samudra Manthan Initiative ===
Launched in December 2023, the Samudra Manthan initiative aimed at reducing plastic pollution in oceans. This initiative collects plastic waste within a 10-kilometre (6.2 mi) radius of the coastline and sends it for recycling. As of 2024, Samudra Manthan has collected 70,000 metric tons (77,000 short tons) of plastic from 207 districts in 19 states.
