= Trust for Retailers and Retail Associates of India =

The Trust for Retailers and Retail Associates of India (TRRAIN), founded by B. S. Nagesh in 2011, is headquartered in Mumbai and partners with various other non-governmental organizations and corporate entities to provide employment opportunities to the abled and disabled.

== Organisation ==
Ameesha Prabhu is the chief executive officer of the Trust. IL&FS Trust Company is the sole corporate trustee of the Trust.

== Initiatives ==
=== TRRAIN Retail Awards ===
The TRRAIN Retail Awards is an initiative aimed at judging the customer service stories of retail associates in the industry. The first edition of the TRRAIN Retail Awards was held in 2011 in Mumbai, and the latest edition was held in the year 2013. The 2013 edition had more than 3,500 retail associates participating, of whom 20 were recognised and awarded for Excellence in Customer Service.
