= Global capability centre =

Type of offshore business entity

A global capability centre (GCC) is an offshore or nearshore entity established by a multinational corporation (MNC) to take advantage of lower costs or human or technological resources available in other geographies. GCC functions can include back-office operations, finance, taxation, media, business management, knowledge management, IT support, engineering, pharmaceutical marketing, clinical trials, pharmacovigilance, medical and regulatory affairs, health informatics, and health research and development.

GCCs are commonly located in India, which was home to 1,700 GCCs employing as of 2025 1.9 million people in cities like Bengaluru, Pune, Hyderabad, Noida, Gurgaon, Chennai, and Navi Mumbai; their numbers were projected to reach up to 2,200 by 2030. Their initial growth in India was based on India's lower cost structure, but GCCs have added more advanced functions and value beyond the cost arbitrage for MNCs. With higher US fees imposed in 2025 on H-1B visas used by Indian technology workers, expanding GCC capabilities was a strategy that Indian IT firms could use to continue to serve MNCs.
