= Raheja Mindspace =

Brand of commercial and industrial parks

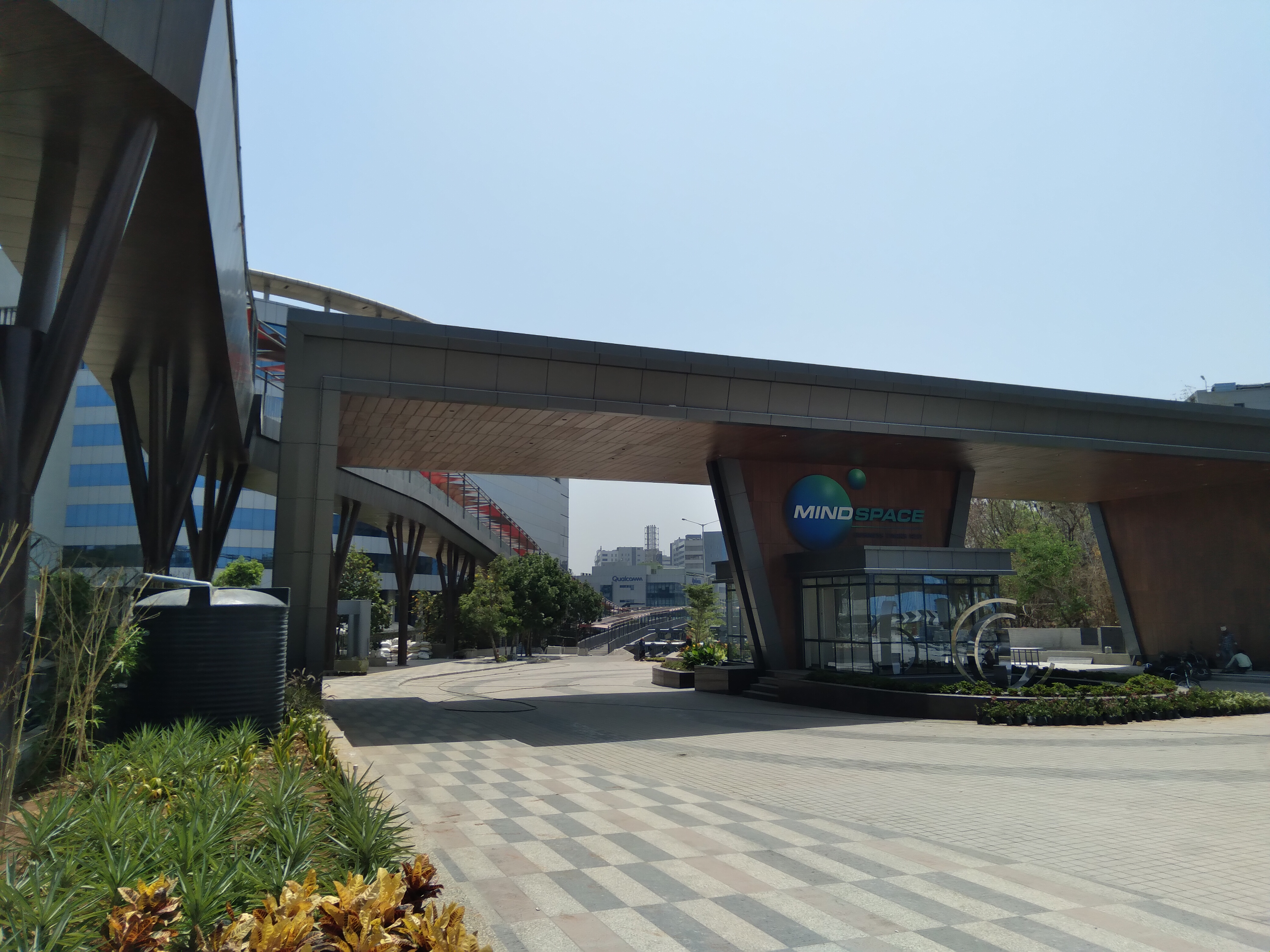

Mindspace is a brand of commercial and industrial parks established by K Raheja Corp. Located in Mumbai, Hyderabad, Chennai and Pune, the industrial hubs offer offices, residential towers, entertainment facilities and other retail businesses. By 2016, the parks developed by Mindspace housed more than 50 businesses in India, including Accenture, L&T Infotech Ltd, Cognizant Technology and Capegemini Group.

The buildings by Mindspace have been minimal environmental impact, which has helped some of its projects to receive recognition, like Madhapur, which was recognized with a gold rating certificate from USGBC. K Raheja Corp also has millions of square feet of building space in green commercial places which have been certified by the Indian Green Building Council (IGBC) and Leadership in Energy and Environmental Design (LEED).

Raheja Mindspace also operates Mindspace Business Parks, a real estate investment trust (REIT).

== Mindspace Malad, Mumbai ==
In 1999-2000, K Raheja Corp developed a suburban park Mindspace, Malad, which was spread across 110 acres. By setting up the technology park in the suburbs, Mindspace was able to meet a huge portion of the commercial space requirement demanded by the IT, ITES industries in Mumbai.

Tenants include JP Morgan Chase and Firstsource. Mindspace Malad was originally designed by Skidmore Owings & Merill LLP.

== Mindspace Madhapur, Hyderabad ==
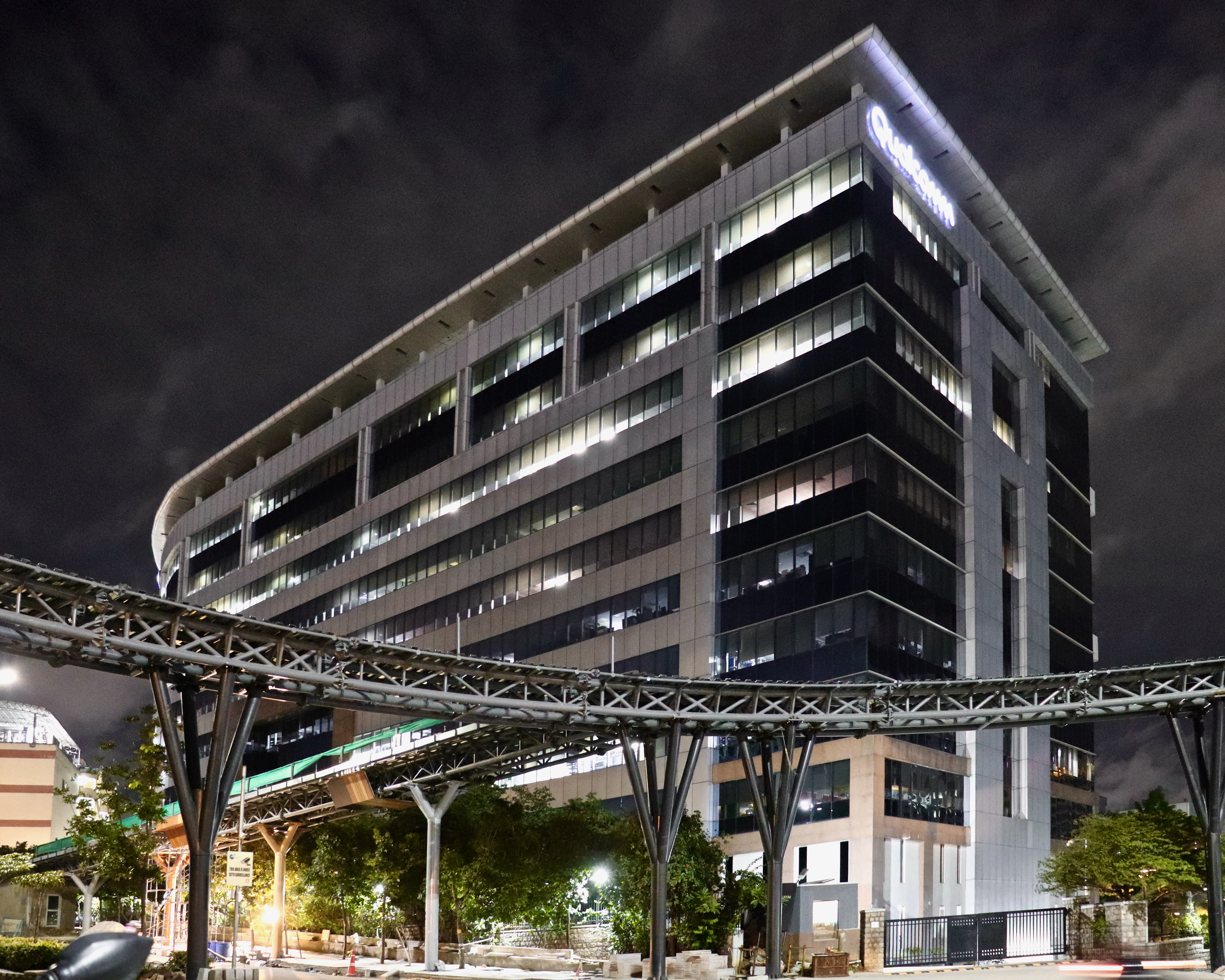
Qualcomm building in techno-park

Raheja's Mindspace developed its first project in Hyderabad on 110 acres of land allotted by APIIC. The techno-campus-cum-park plan in Madhapur was executed in 2004, through a joint venture between the Raheja Group and Andhra Pradesh Industrial Infrastructure Corporation Ltd (APIIC).

With 21 buildings, Mindspace Madhapur is Hyderabad's first and largest Indian Green Building Council Gold Rating Campus, with systems for monitoring indoor air quality, managing rainwater systems, sewage treatment plants, solar panels, etc. The 4-acre reserve green area in Mindspace Madhapur has 3,500 trees within the campus, and consists of an open-air theatre, and tennis courts. In April 2022, a one km long skywalk was opened that connects the Raidurg metro station to the Raheja Mindspace campus.

== Mindspace Pocharam, Hyderabad ==
Mindspace Pocharam is an SEZ & IT Park which was launched in 2006, built in stages and for an eventual built-up space approx. 6 million sft.

== Mindspace Shamshabad, Hyderabad ==
Mindspace Shamshabad is a business district which is spread across 305 acres, which consists of 10 buildings of G+three floors. With 6 completed, the remaining 4 buildings are set to be completed in 2021. Located near Rajiv Gandhi International Airport, Mindspace Shamshabad will be connected by the Hyderabad Metro.

== Mindspace Gandhinagar ==
Mindspace Gandhinagar is Gujarat's first IT Special Economic Zone, and commenced operations in 2012, and houses multiple multinational corporations in the IT sector.

== Mindspace Bengalaru ==
Located in Whitefield's EPIP Zone, Mindspace Bengalaru is workspace featuring several modern amenities and facilities.

== Developer ==
K Raheja Corp is a real estate development company dealing in commercial, residential and retail projects. They are the developers of Mindspace, a commercial real estate project in major metropolitan cities of Mumbai, Hyderabad, Chennai and Pune. The developers have received gold rating certification from the US Green Building Council (USGBC) for Mindspace commercial business park in Hyderabad.

== Controversy ==
There were allegations that Raheja group had caused a dilution of the Andhra Pradesh government's stake in the Mindspace project. The stake was later restored to 11 per cent in accordance with the original memorandum of understanding. Negotiations in 2011 between the Raheja group and APIIC (and the Andhra Pradesh government) sought to restore the state's share in the ownership and rental revenues from the project.

== See also ==
- Software industry in India
