= TG-iPASS =

The Telangana Industrial Project Approval and Self-Certification System (TG-iPASS) is a certification service to establish Industries, manufacturing, and services, in the state of Telangana, India. The process allows a single mechanism for doing business with the state, including obtaining required permissions within stipulated timelines. Twenty-three departments are providing forty types of approvals through the process. Its online facility provides features to applicants to apply for approvals, pay fees, respond to queries, and download the approvals given by the department, eliminating the necessity of direct approach. Common enclosures evolved through process re-engineering has done away with the process of attaching the same documents multiple times.

According to data provided by the Telangana government, between January 2015 and November 2018, over 8,500 projects with a total investment of Rs 1.4 lakh crore have been approved. Of those, over 6,000 projects with an investment of around Rs 60,660 crore have commenced operations. The government claims these projects have generated 2.7 lakh jobs.

== History ==
In 2002, the Andhra Pradesh Legislature passed the Single Window Clearance bill, an implementation of a single-window system, and received the assent of the Governor on 1 August 2002.

This 2002 act was to provide speedy processing for issue of various licenses, clearances and certificated required for setting up of industries, intended to promote of industrial development, and to provide a friendly investor environment. It is expedient to provide for speedy implementation of industrial and other projects in the State, by providing single point clearances to promoters and to ensure early commercial production of such projects.

After the formation of Telangana, the fourth bill passed by the Legislative assembly was the Telangana Industrial Project Approval and Self-Certification System (TG-iPASS) Act, 2014. The bill received the assent of the Governor on 3 December 2014, and the service went online on 1 April 2016.

== The Act ==
The central purpose of the act is to mandate industrial clearances within a pre-established time span, including penalties if clearance applications are not processed within said time span. Provisions are autonomously granted when the processing authority fails to pass the final orders on the application within the stipulated time.
