= Shoppers Stop =

Indian department store chain

Shoppers Stop Limited
- Type: Public
- Traded as: BSE: 532638; NSE: SHOPERSTOP
- Industry: Retail
- Founded: 1991
- Headquarters: Mumbai, India
- Area served: India
- Key people: B. S. Nagesh (Chairman); Kavindra Mishra (ED & CEO)
- Revenue: ▲₹5,228 crore (US$560 million) (FY24)
- Operating income: ▼₹226 crore (US$24 million) (FY24)
- Net income: ▼₹56 crore (US$6.0 million) (FY24)
- Parent: K Raheja Corp
- Website: www.shoppersstop.com

Former logo of Shoppers Stop used prior to 2008

Shoppers Stop is an Indian department store chain, owned by the K Raheja Corp. There are 108 stores across 45 cities in India, with clothing, accessories, handbags, shoes, jewellery, fragrances, cosmetics, health and beauty products, home furnishing, and decor products. Shoppers Stop is listed on the BSE and NSE.

== History ==
The first store was opened in Andheri, Mumbai on 27th Oct 1991.

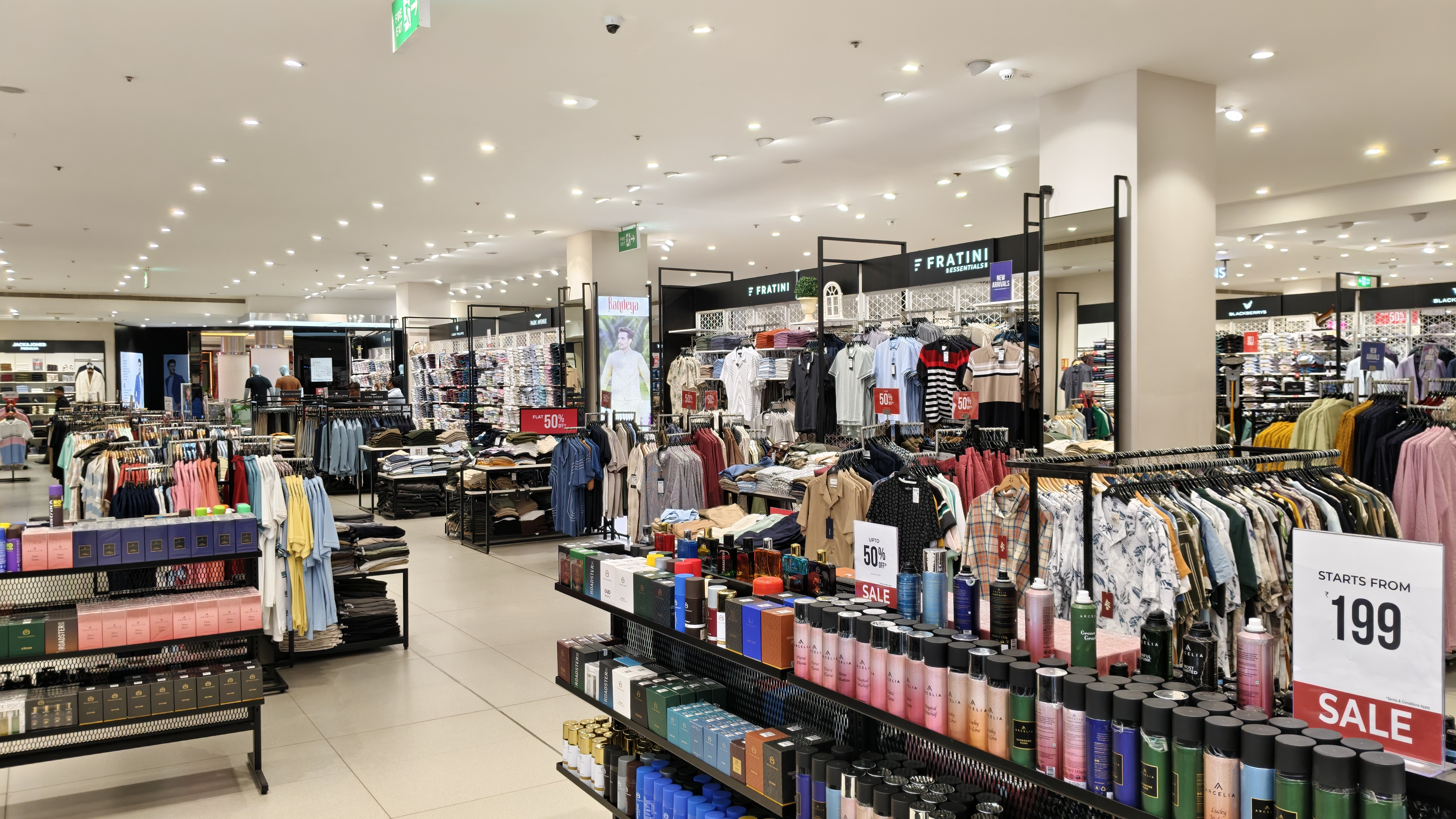
Shoppers Stop store in DB Mall, Bhopal, India

The company opened its 22nd store at Lucknow in 2006. In 2007, it entered into partnership with Nuance Group AG, and opened stores in Mumbai T1 and Bengaluru Airports.

An e-store with delivery across major cities in India was launched in 2008, with a smartphone app in 2016.

In June 2018, the retail chain underwent a board rejig in which promoter Chandru L Raheja resigned as the non-executive chairman after having served for over two decades.

Chandru Raheja was succeeded by BS Nagesh.

== Awards ==
Shoppers Stop Ltd has been awarded "the Hall of Fame" and won "the Emerging Market Retailer of the Year Award", by the World Retail Congress at Barcelona, in April 2008.

== See also ==
- Reliance Centro
- Pantaloons
- HomeStop
- Crossword Bookstores
- Estèe Lauder
- MAC
- Clinique
- Bobbi Brown
