= History of clothing in the Indian subcontinent =

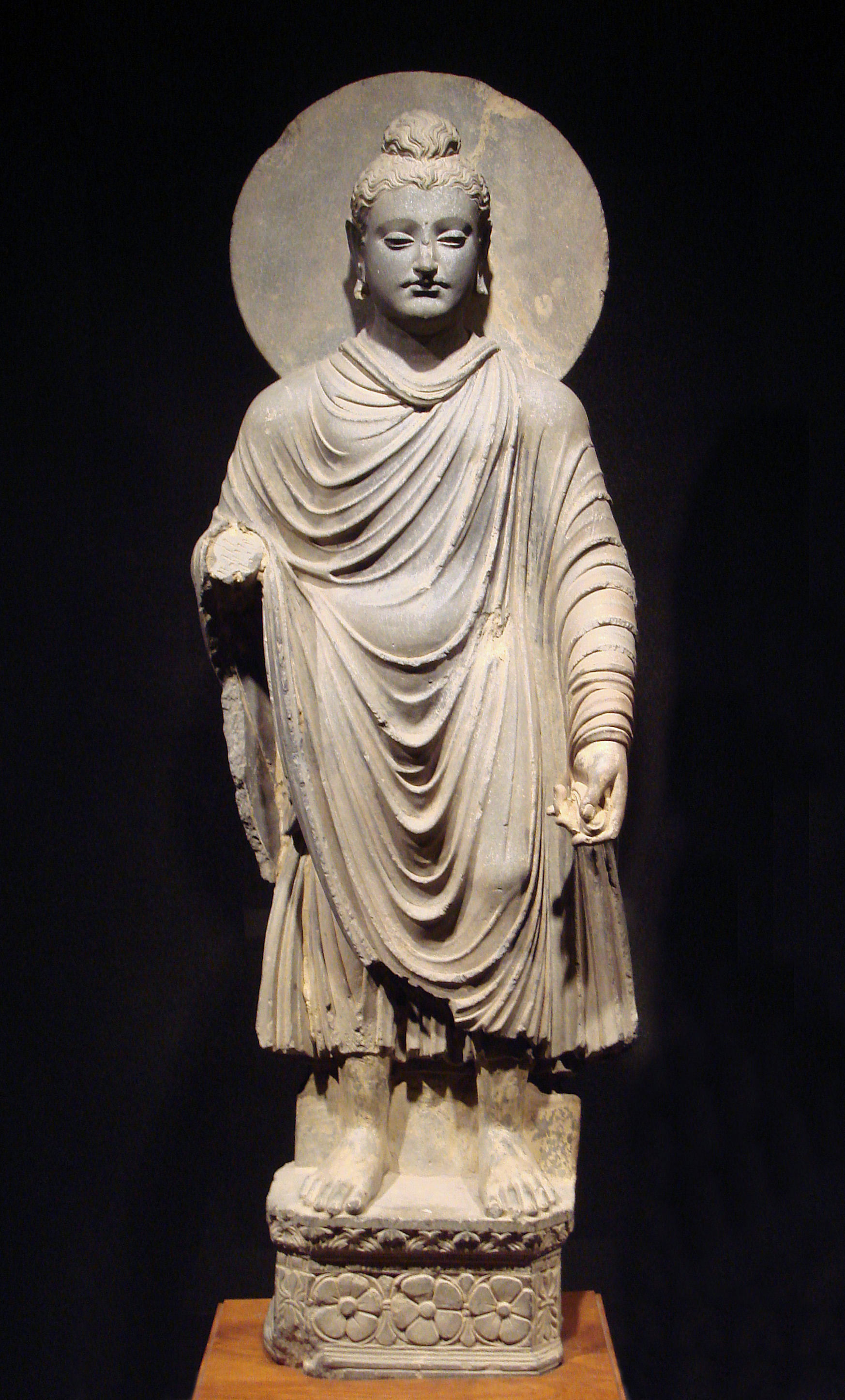
The Buddha wearing kāṣāya robes, Gandhara, 1st-2nd century CE. Height about 1 metre. Tokyo National Museum

History of clothing in the Indian subcontinent can be traced to the Indus Valley Civilisation (3300 BCE-1300 BCE) or earlier. Indians have mainly worn clothing made up of locally grown cotton. India was one of the first places where cotton was cultivated and used even as early as 2500 BCE during the Harappan era. The remnants of the ancient Indian clothing can be found in the figurines discovered from the sites near the Indus Valley civilisation, the rock-cut sculptures, the cave paintings, and human art forms found in temples and monuments. These scriptures view the figures of human wearing clothes which can be wrapped around the body. Taking the instances of the sari, the bandana, to that of the turban and the dhoti; the traditional Indian wears were mostly tied around the body in various ways.

== Indus Valley Civilisation period ==
Evidence for textiles in Indus Valley Civilisation are not available from preserved textiles but from impressions made into clay and from preserved pseudomorphs. The only evidence found for clothing is from iconography and some unearthed Harappan figurines which are usually unclothed. These little depictions show that usually men wore a long cloth wrapped over their waist and fastened it at the back (just like a close clinging dhoti). A turban was worn in some communities as shown by some of the male figurines. Evidence also shows that there was a tradition of wearing a long robe over the left shoulder in higher class society to show their opulence. The normal attire of the women at that time was a skirt up to knee length, leaving the waist bare. Headdresses were also worn by the women. Also women wore long skirts, stitched with tight tunic on their upper body and trousers as well. Inferences from mother goddess statue from Delhi National Museum suggests female wearing a short tunic with a short skirt and trousers. There also evidences of men wearing trousers, conical gown/tunic with an upper waist band. The mother goddess statues show women also wearing heavy earrings which were also pretty common in the historic period of India and also depict with heavy necklaces with overhanging medallion with holes in them for gemstones. Female statues and terracotta arts and figurines like a dancing girl also depict long hair probably braided and draped in cloth.

Fibre for clothing generally used were cotton, flax, silk, wool, linen, and leather. One fragment of coloured cloth is available in pieces of evidence which are dyed with red madder show that people in Harappan Civilisation dyed their cotton clothes with a range of colours.

Both sexes wore jewellery. The ornaments include necklaces, bracelets, earrings, anklets, rings, bangles, and pectorals, which were generally made of gold, silver, copper, stones like lapis lazuli, turquoise, amazonite, and quartz. Many of the male figurines also have their hair dressed in various styles like the hair woven into a booty, hair coiled in a ring on the top of the head, while beards were usually trimmed. Indus Valley Civilisation men are frequently depicted wearing headbands especially to contain hair bun at the back. People have been shown wearing elaborate headdresses like turban, conical hats, pakol hats.

Dressing of Indus Valley Civilisation people show presence of multi-ethnic people of diverse backgrounds. For instance, people have been depicted wearing Pashtun style pakol hat with a chocker like neck ornament as well as Punjabi style pagri and Rajasthani style bangles and necklaces and many other styles prominent in neighbouring regions of the Indian subcontinent.

Some scholars, such as Jonathan Mark Kenoyer, have argued that headdress from the royal cemetery of Ur is an import from Indus Valley Civilisation since similar headdresses have been found to have been depicted in many of its Mother Goddess figurines and actual ones discovered from sites such as Kunal and the floral depiction in gold leaves of species native to Indian subcontinent such as Dalbergia sissoo or pipal, and since no such ornamentation has been shown in Mesopotamian art itself.

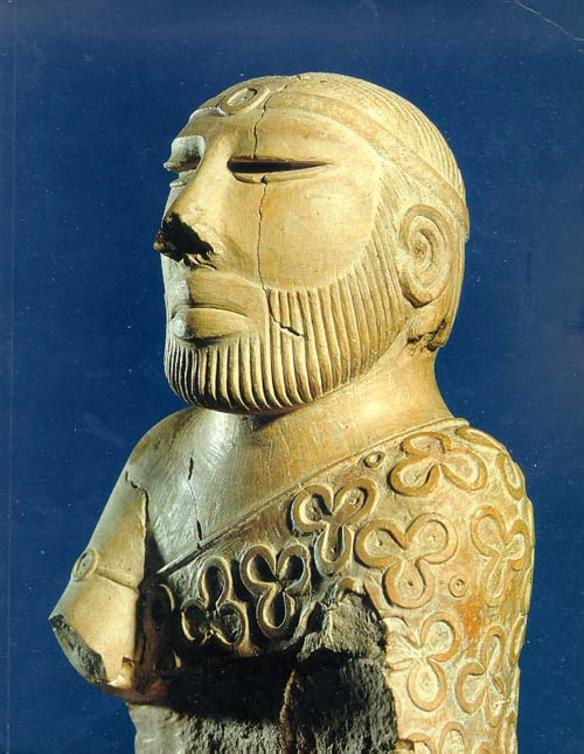
Statue of the "Priest King" wearing a printed robe, Mohenjo-daro, Indus Valley civilisation, c. 2000–1900 BCE

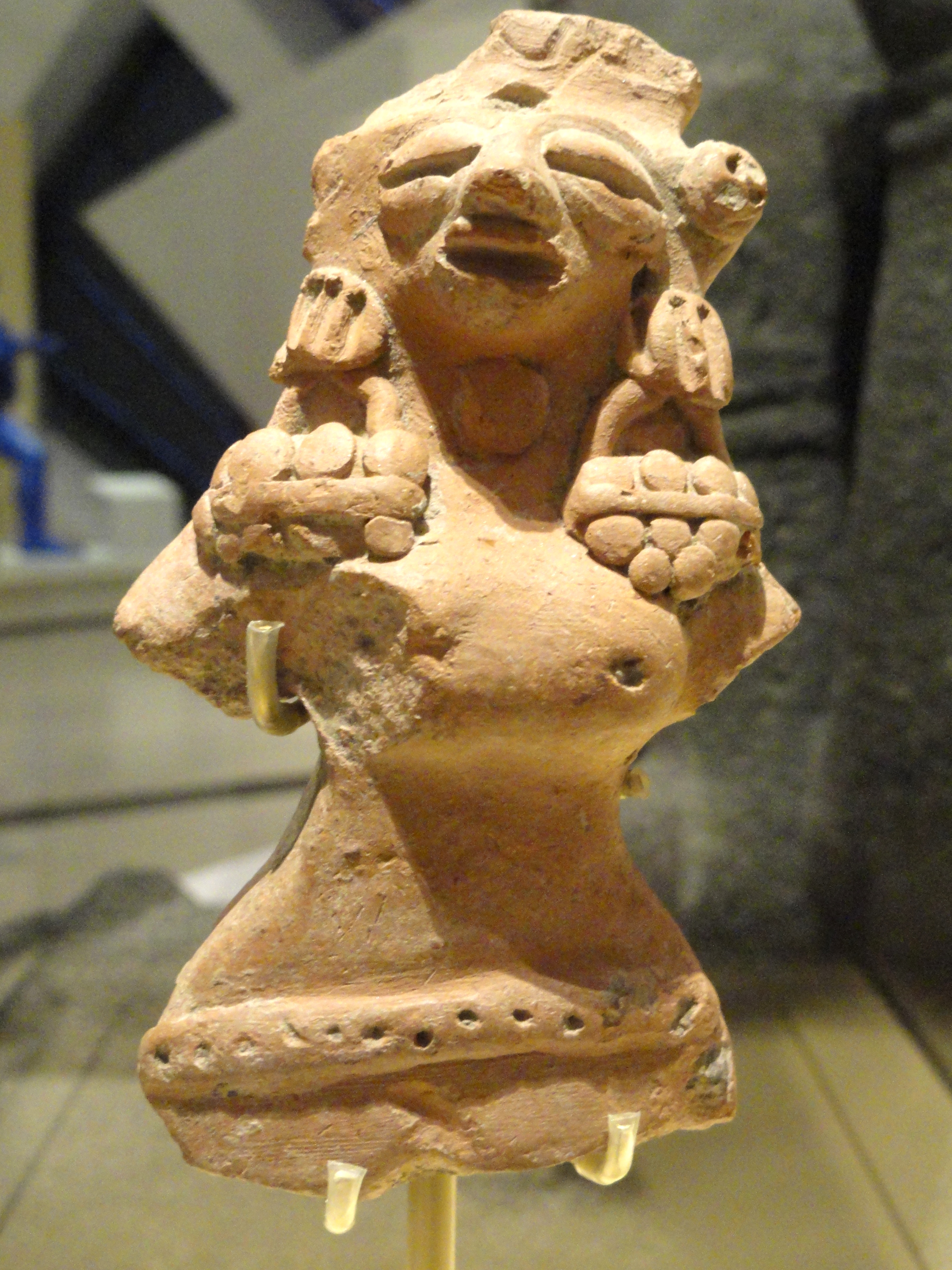
Woman's statue from the Indus Valley Civilisation wearing heavy earrings

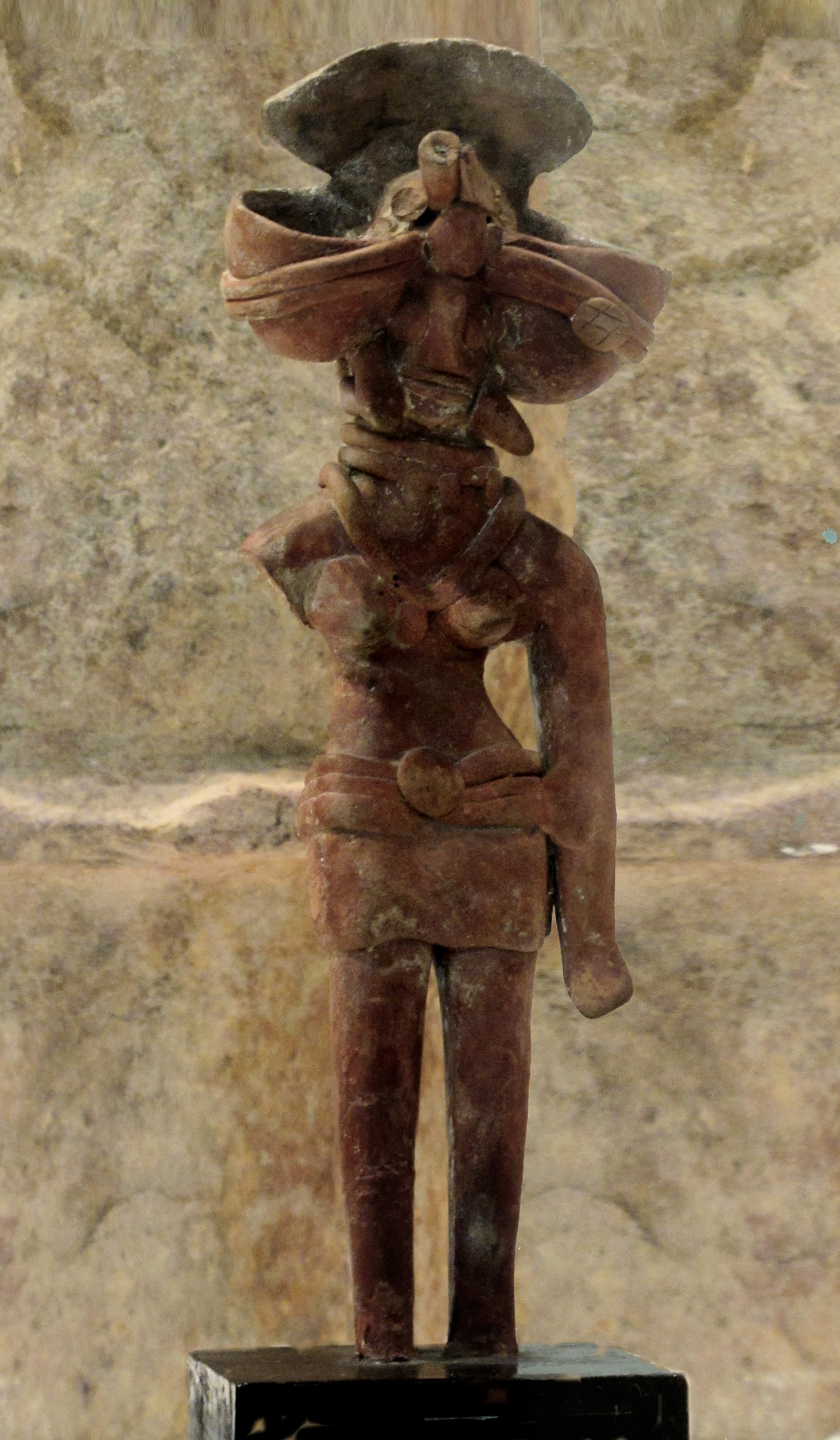
Mother Goddess wearing tight-fitted short skirt part fastened with a broad waistband using a medallion like clasp, necklaces, ear-ornaments, Mohenjo-daro

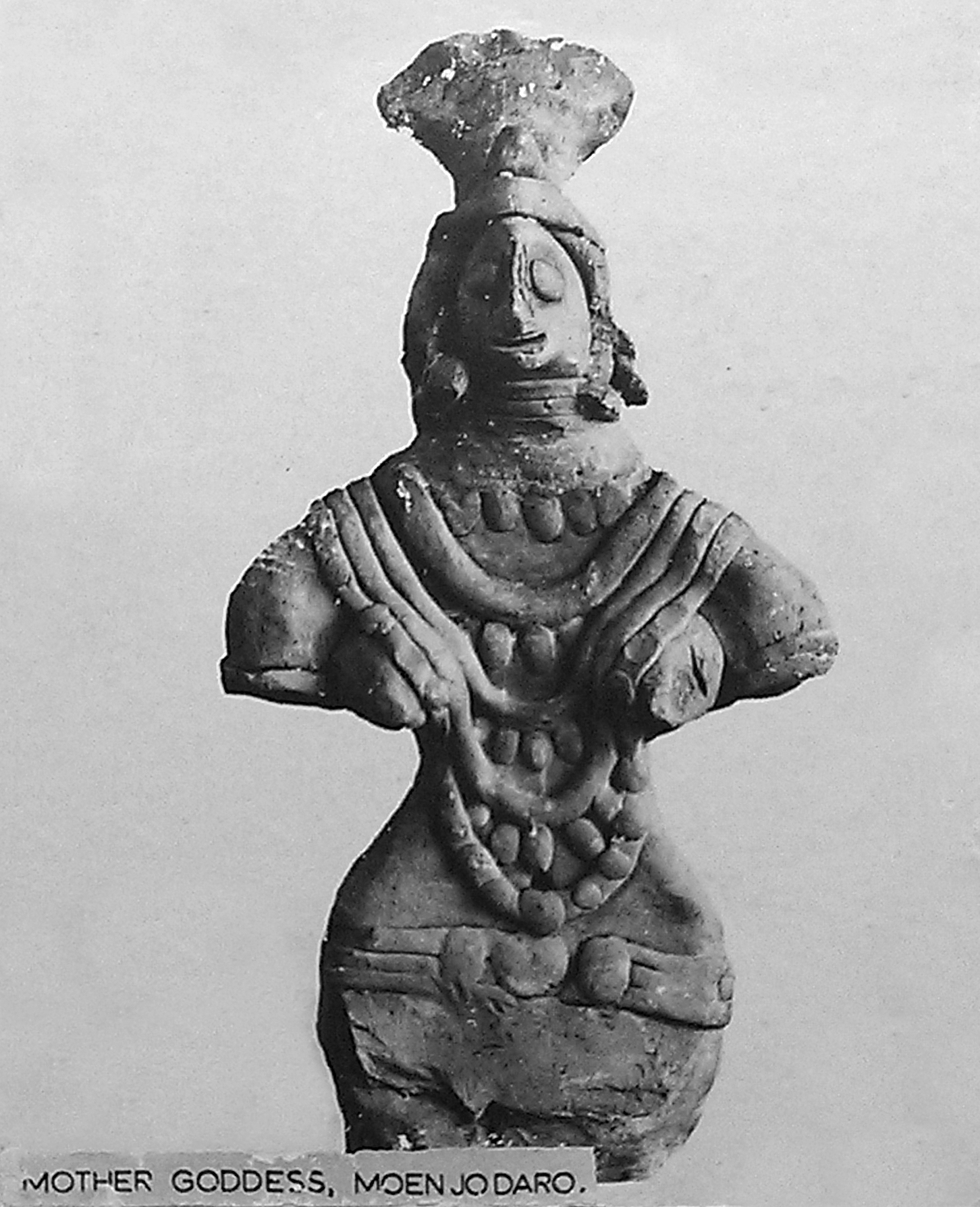
Mother Goddess wearing ornate necklace, Mohenjo-daro

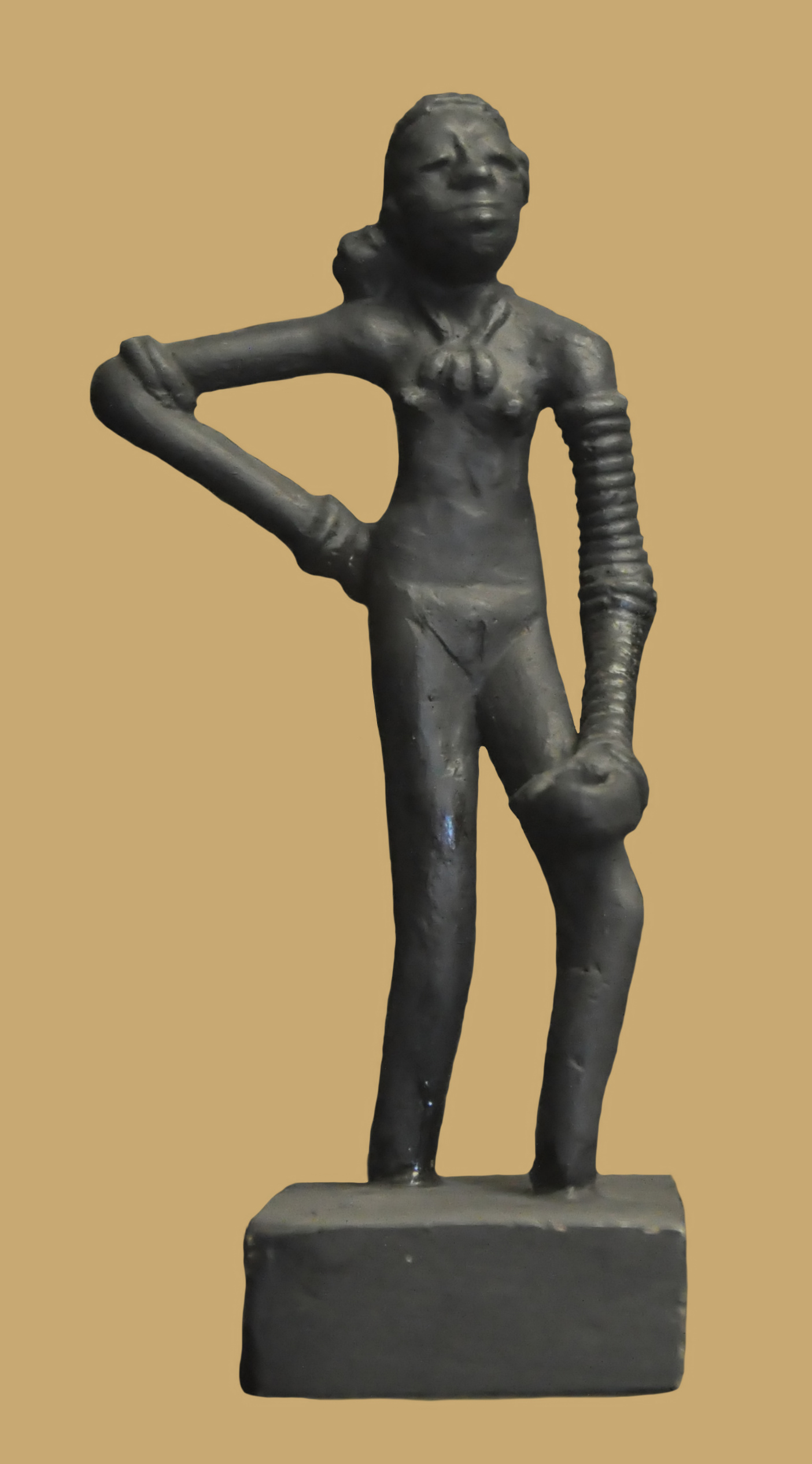
Dancing girl statue from Mohenjo-daro, with one arm completely filled with bangles

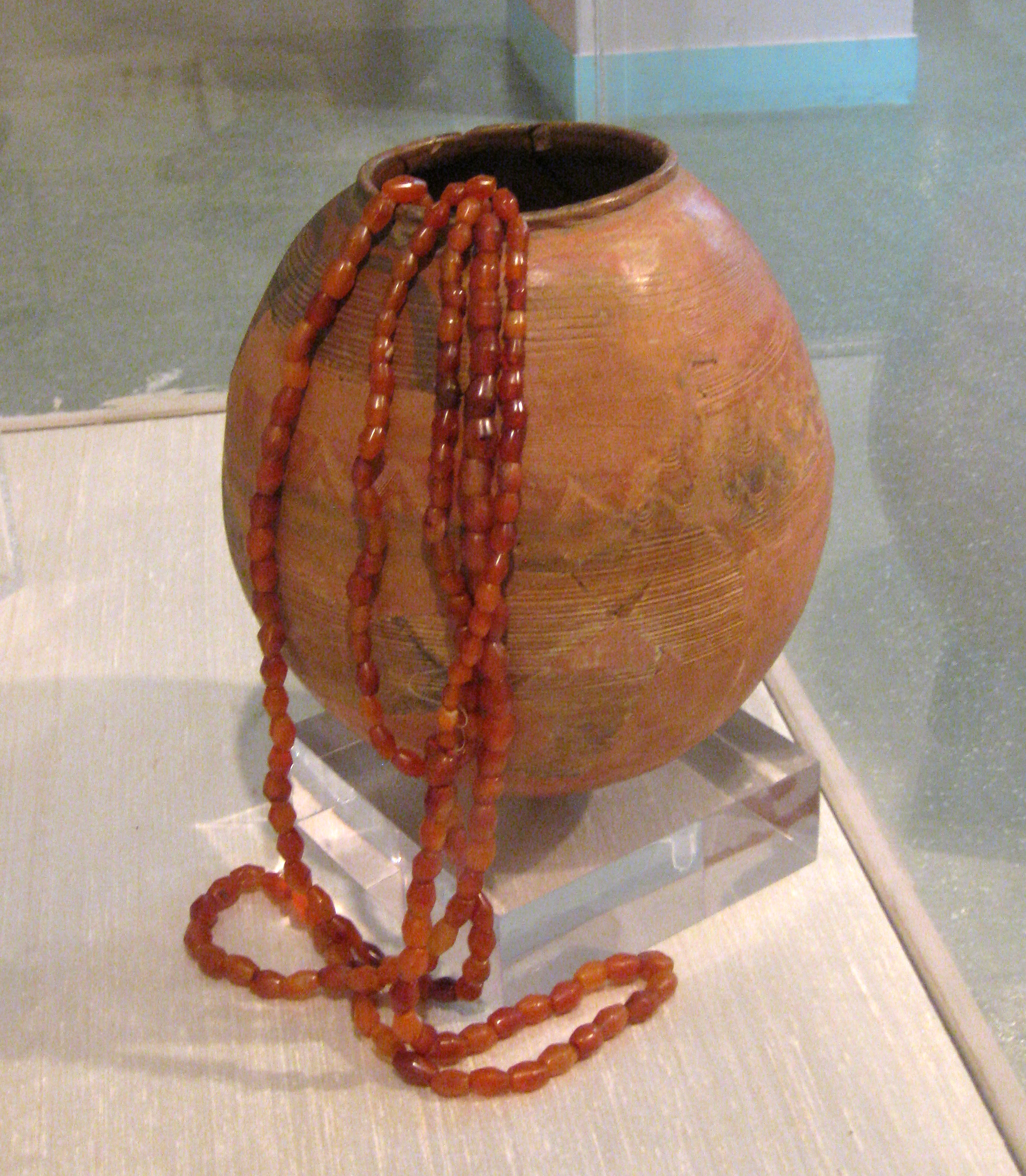
Burnished and Painted Clay Ovoid Vase depicting horned figure, with Round Carnelian Beads in, Burzahom (Kashmir), 2700 BC

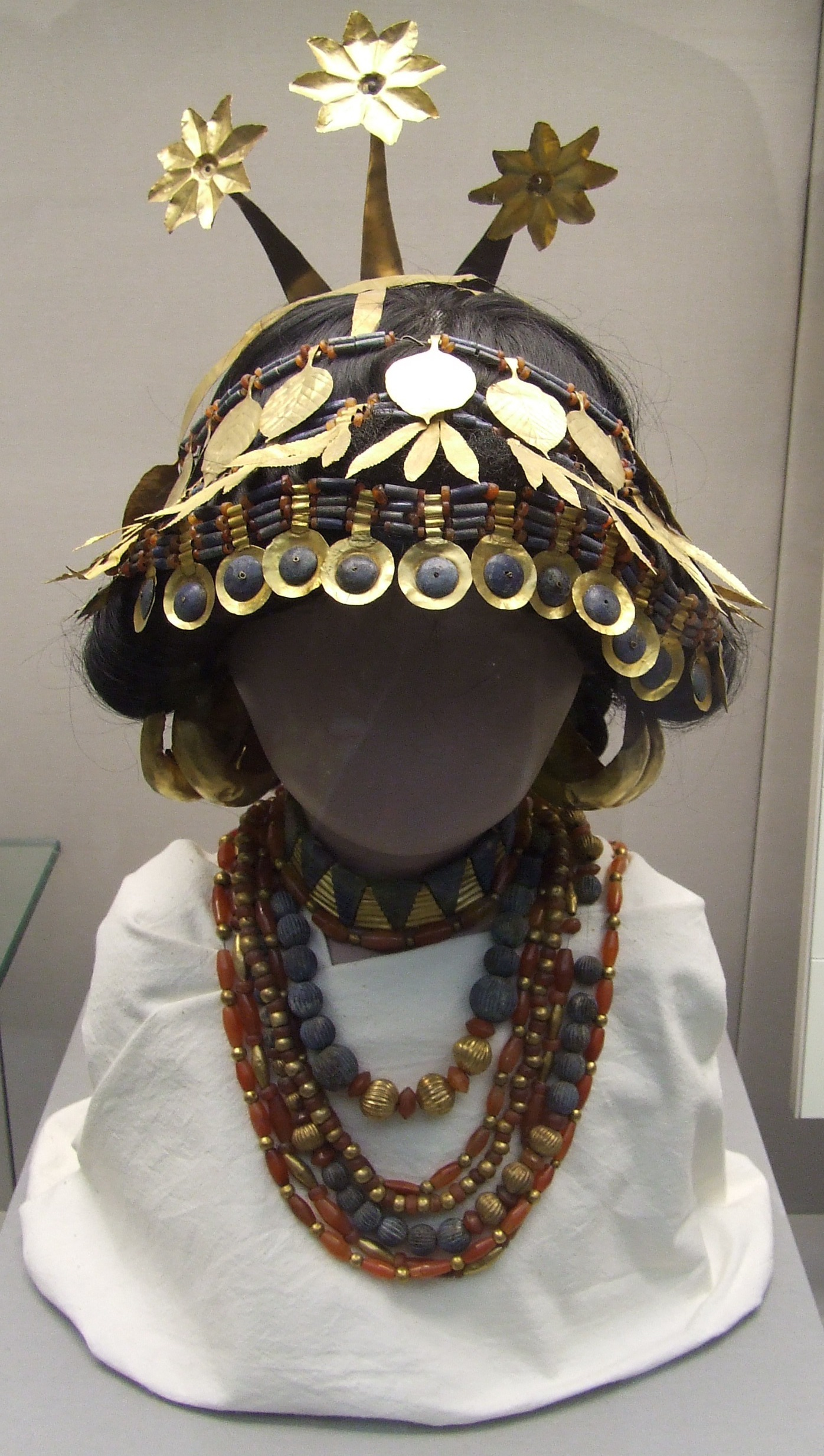
Royal cemetery of Ur headdress according to some scholars is a direct import from Indus valley civilisation and similar headdress has been discovered at site of Kunal.

== Ancient period ==
=== Vedic period ===
The Vedic period was the time duration between 1500 and 500 BCE. The garments worn in the Vedic period mainly included a single cloth wrapped around the whole body and draped over the shoulder. People used to wear the lower garment called paridhana which was pleated in front and used to tie with a belt called mekhala and an upper garment called uttariya (a covering like a shawl) which they used to remove during summers. "Orthodox males and females usually wore the uttariya by throwing it over the left shoulder only, in the style called upavita". There was another garment called pravara that they used to wear in cold weather. This was the general garb of both the sexes, differing only in size of cloth and manner of wearing. Sometimes the poor people wore the lower garment as a loincloth only, while the wealthy would wear it extending to the feet as a sign of prestige.

In the Rig Veda, mainly three terms were described – adhivastra, kurlra, and andpratidhi – for garments which correspondingly denote the outer cover (veil), a head-ornament or head-dress (turban), and part of woman's dress. Many pieces of evidence are found for ornaments like niska or rukma, which were worn in the ear and around the neck; there was a great use of gold beads in necklaces which show that gold was mainly used in jewellery. Rajata-hiranya ('white gold'), also known as silver, was not in that much of use as no evidence of silver is figured out in the Rig Veda.

In the Atharva Veda, garments began to be made of the inner cover, an outer cover, and a chest-cover. Besides kurlra and andpratidhi (which were already mentioned in the Rig Veda), there are other parts, such as nivi, vavri, upavasana, kumba, usnlsa, and tirlta, that also appeared in Atharva Veda, which correspondingly denote underwear, upper garment, veil, and the last three denoting some kinds of head-dress (head-ornament). Also mentioned were updnaha (footwear) and kambala (blanket), mani (jewel) is also mentioned for making ornaments in this Vedic text.

==== Pre-Mauryan era ====
Even though scholars have debated the archaeological evidence from the pre-Mauryan era, a lot of terracotta artifacts by various scholars have been dated to the pre-Mauryan era which shows continuity of the dressing styles leading up to the Mauryan period. The terracotta also contain naturalistic style of depicting human faces just like Mauryan periods. The pre-Mauryan periods have been marked by the continuation of Indus arts and depict elaborate headdresses, conical hats with heavy earring. Bronze rattling mirror excavated from Pazyryk dated to the 4th century BCE also depict Indians wearing typical Indian classical clothing such as the dhoti wrap and tight-fitting half-sleeved stitched shirts like kurta. Another pre-Mauryan archaeological evidence of Indian dressing comes from Saurashtra janapada coins which are one of the earliest representations of Indian pre-Mauryan arts. The coins are dated between 450 and 300 BCE and have been repeatedly over struck just like punch-marked coins.

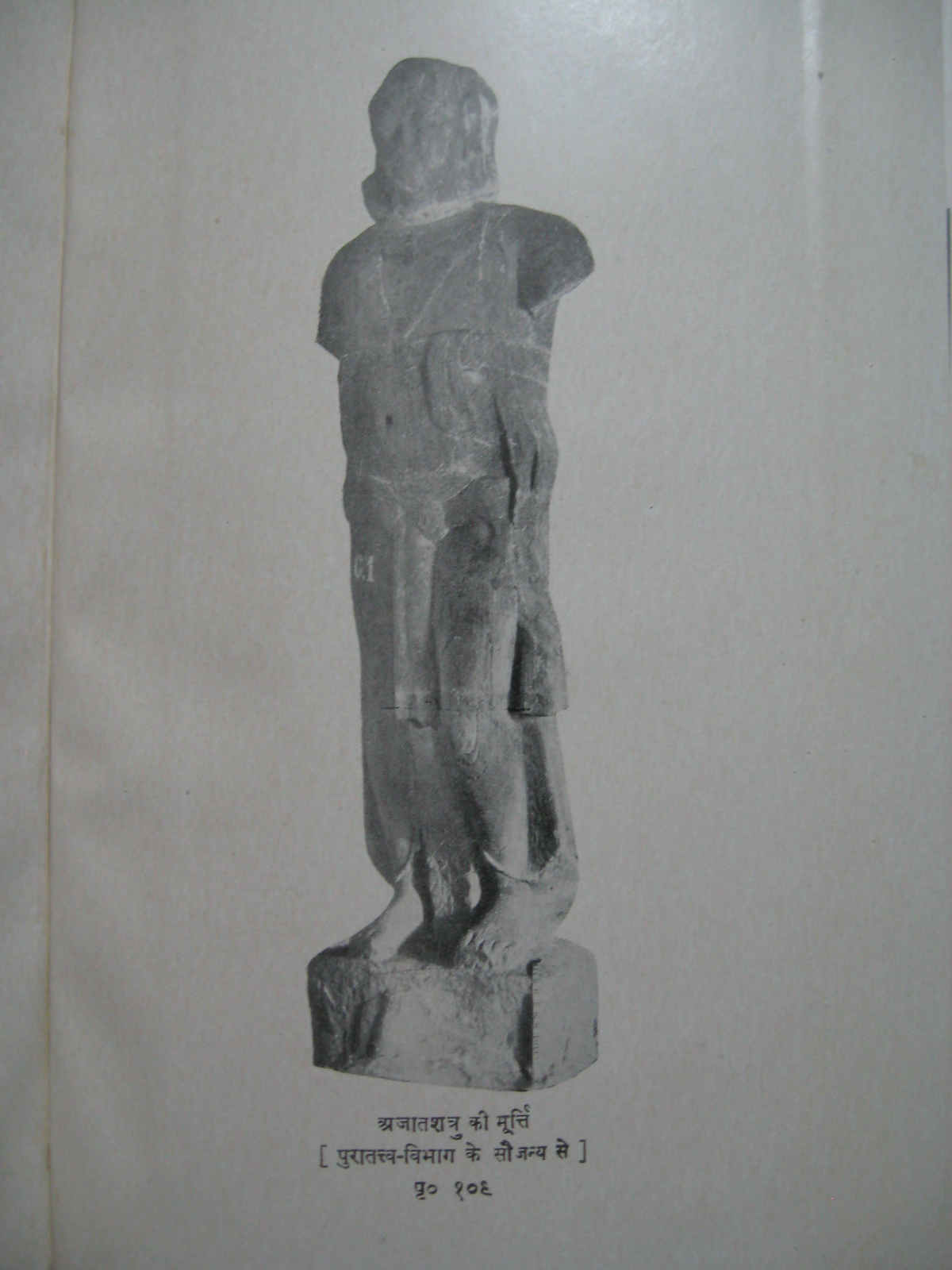
Statue of Magadhan king Ajatashatru wearing drapes

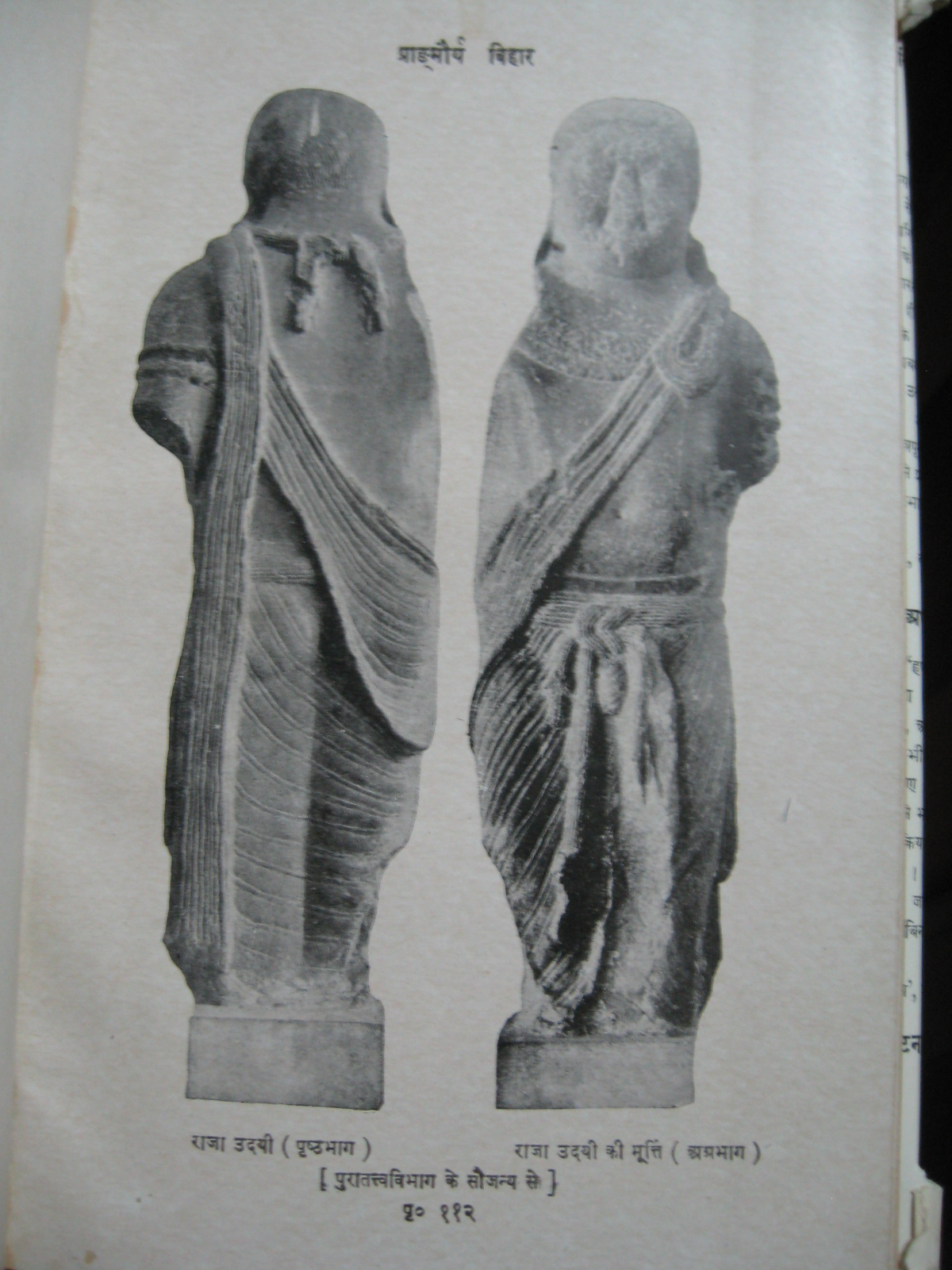
Statue of Magadhan king Udayin wearing drapes

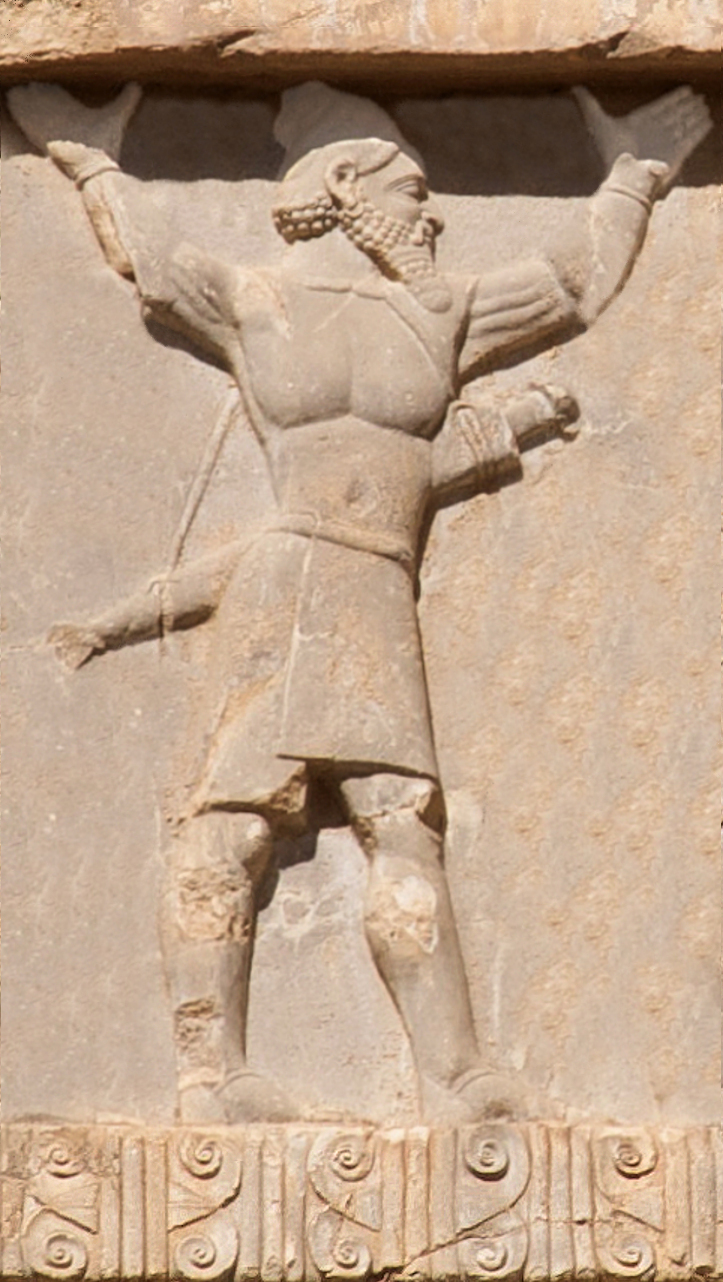
Hindush soldier, wearing a Dhoti and a turban. Tomb of Xerxes I, Naqsh-e Rostam, c. 480 BCE

=== Mauryan period ===
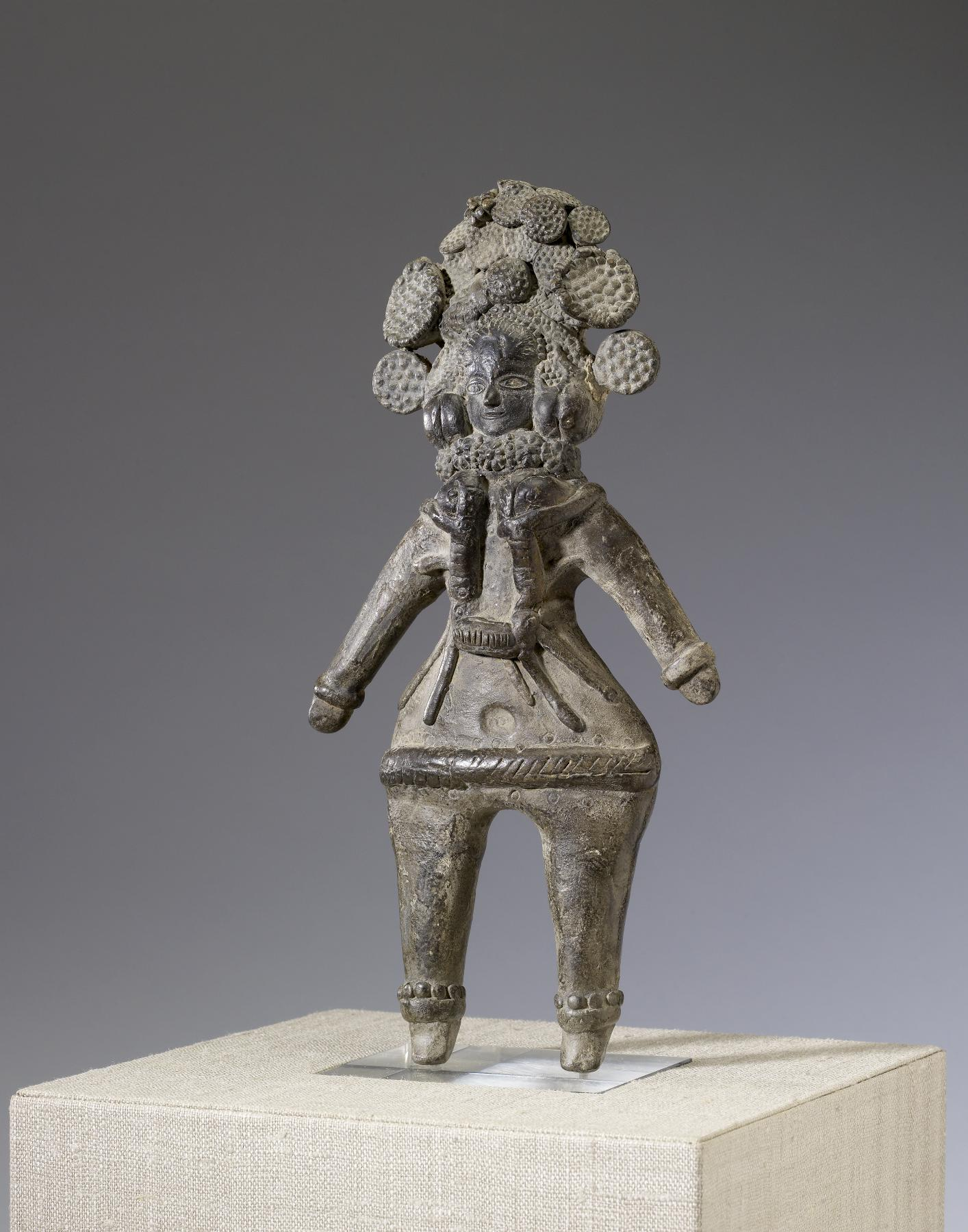
The Woman statue: evidence of stitching, Mathura, 3rd century BCE.

During the Mauryan dynasty (322–185 BC) the earliest evidence of stitched female clothing is available from the statue of a woman (from Mathura, 3rd century BCE). Ladies in the Mauryan Empire often used to wear an embroidered fabric waistband with drum-headed knots at the ends. As an upper garment, people's main garment was uttariya, a long scarf. The difference existed only in the manner of wearing. Sometimes, its one end is thrown over one shoulder and sometimes it is draped over both shoulders.

In textiles, mainly cotton, silk, linen, wool, muslin, etc. are used as fibres. Ornaments latched on to a special place in this era also. Some of the jewellery had their specific names also. Satlari, chaulari, paklari were some of the necklaces.

Men wore Antariya (knee-length, worn in kachcha style with the fluted end tucked in at centre front) and Tunic (one of the earliest depictions of the cut and sewn garment; it has short sleeves and a round neck, full front opening with ties at the neck and waist, and is hip length). A statue of a warrior shows Boots (fitting to the knees cap) and a band (tied at the back over short hair). A broad flat sword with cross straps on the sheath is suspended from the left shoulder.

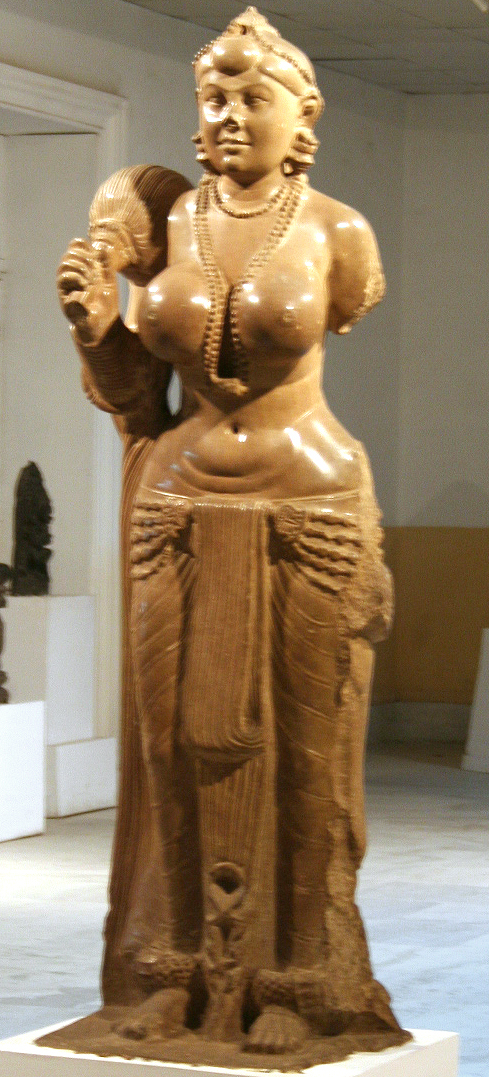
Yakshini wearing dhoti wrap and elaborate necklace, Mauryan period

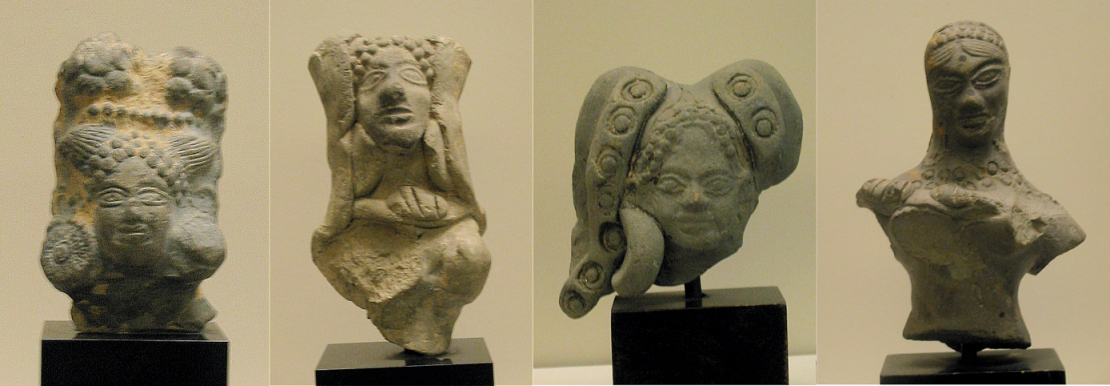
Hair styles of the Mauryan period

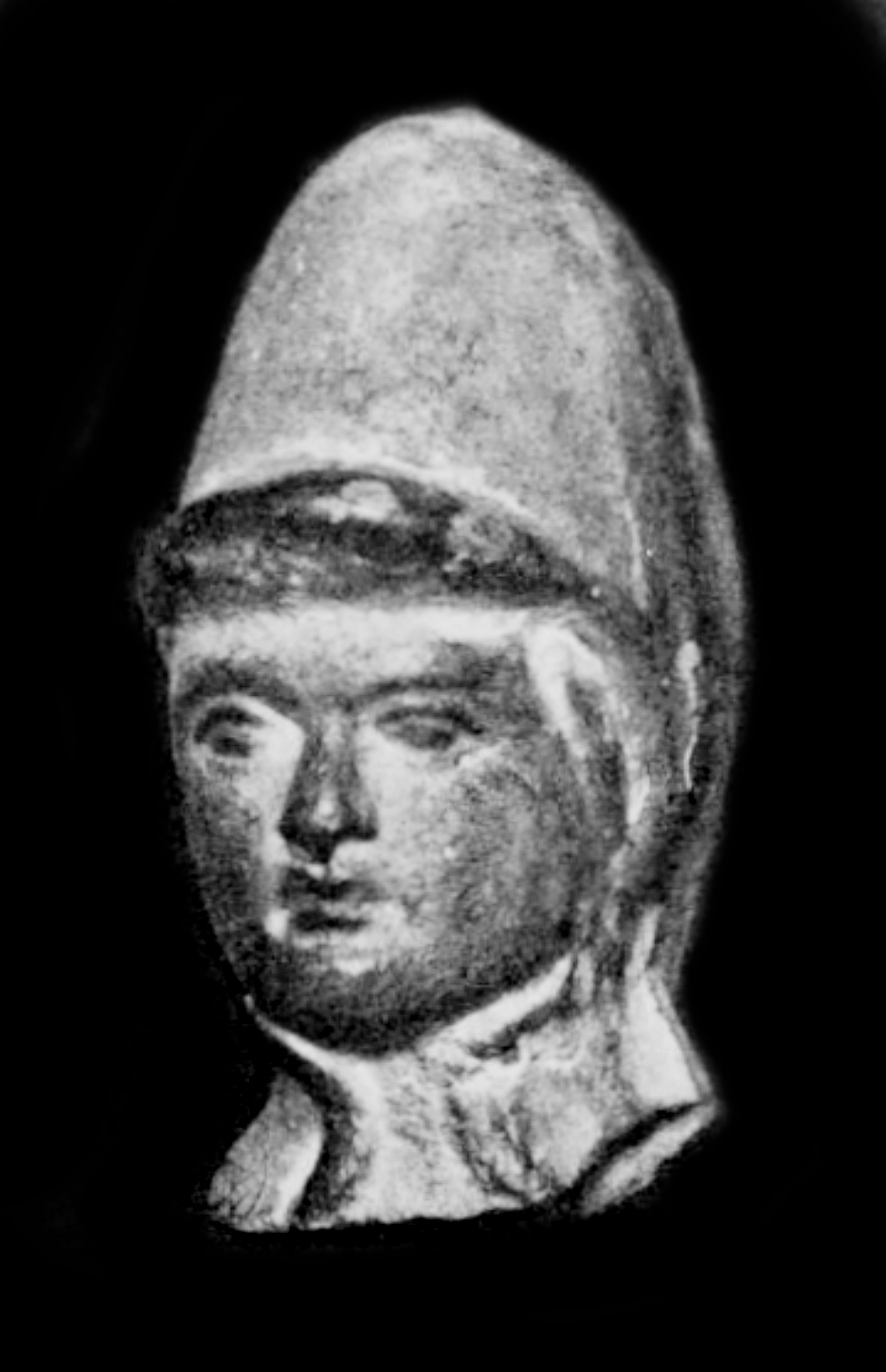
Mauryan head with a conical hat from Sarnath

== Classical period ==
=== Early classical period ===
Early classical period has ample evidence of dresses worn by ancient Indians in several relief sculptures which depict not only the dressing styles, but also architecture and lifestyle of the period. Buddhist reliefs from Amravathi, Gandhara, Mathura, and many other sites contain carved reliefs from Jataka tales and exhibit the fashion of the period between the 2nd century BCE to Gupta periods.

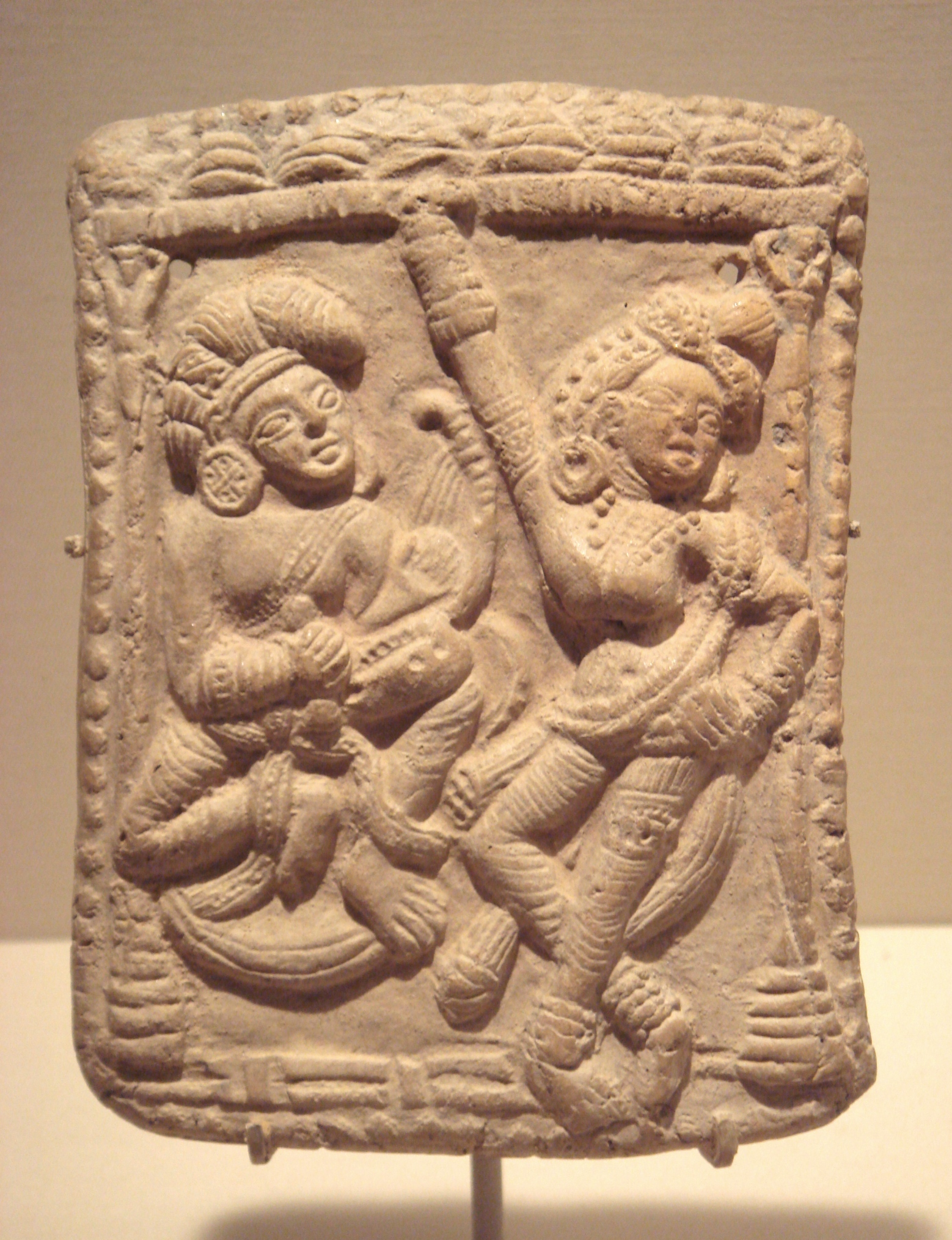
Shunga royal family wearing traditional Indian attire, West Bengal, 1st century BCE

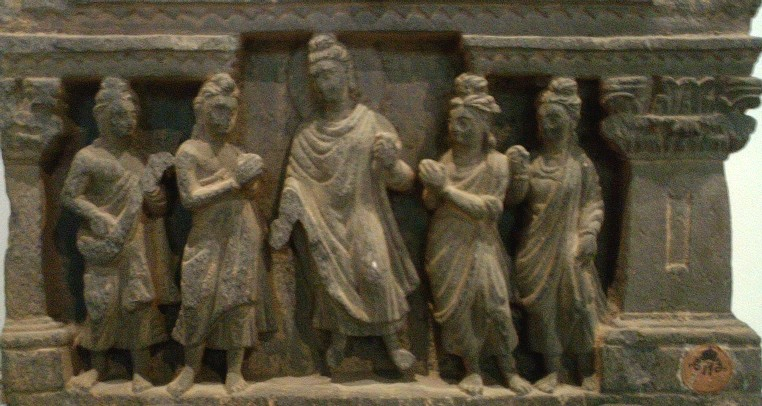
Scene of the life of the Buddha, wearing kāṣāya, Gandhara, 2nd–3rd-century CE (Kushan period)

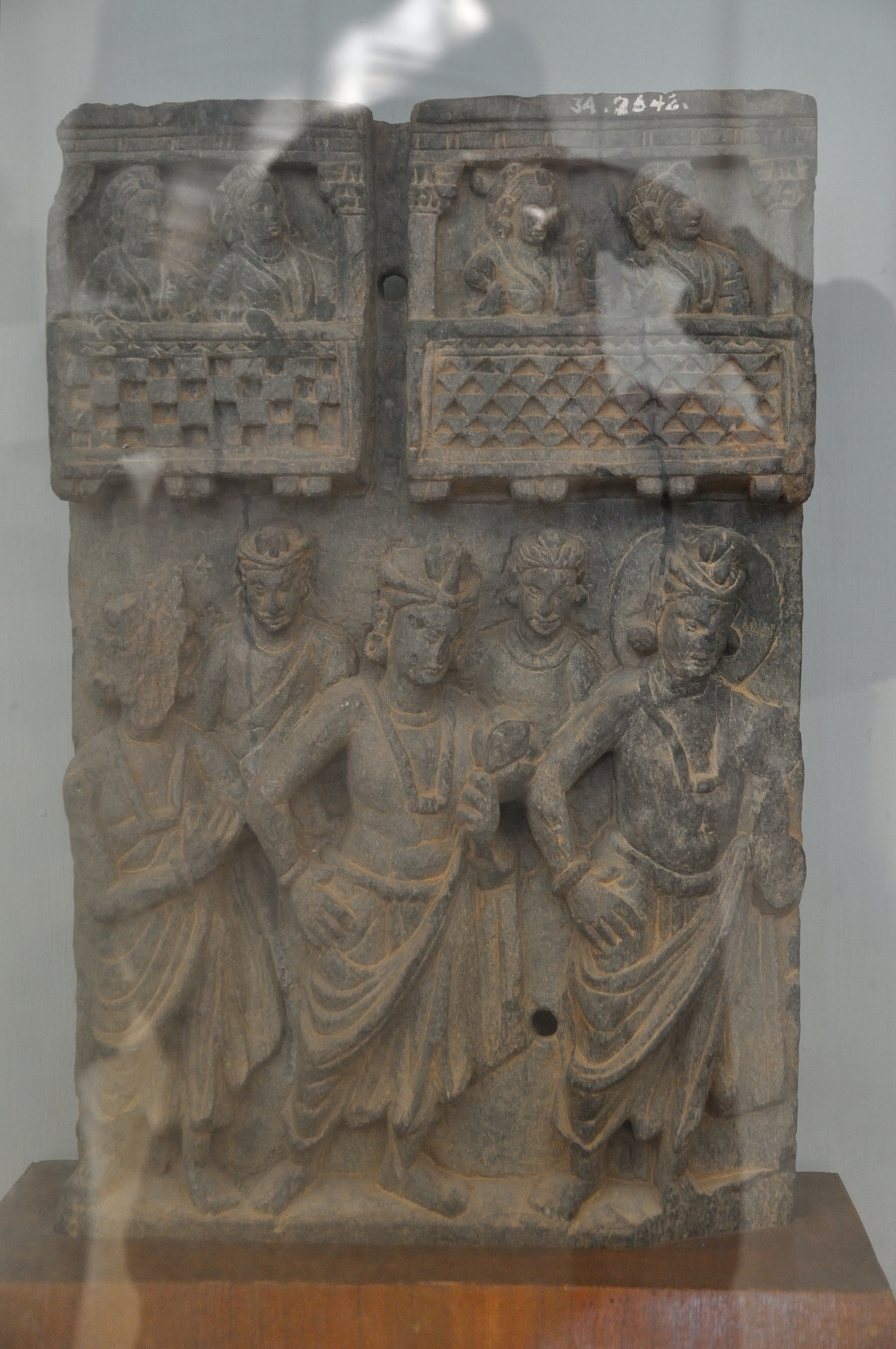
Relief depicting men in antriya and uttariya, 1st century CE

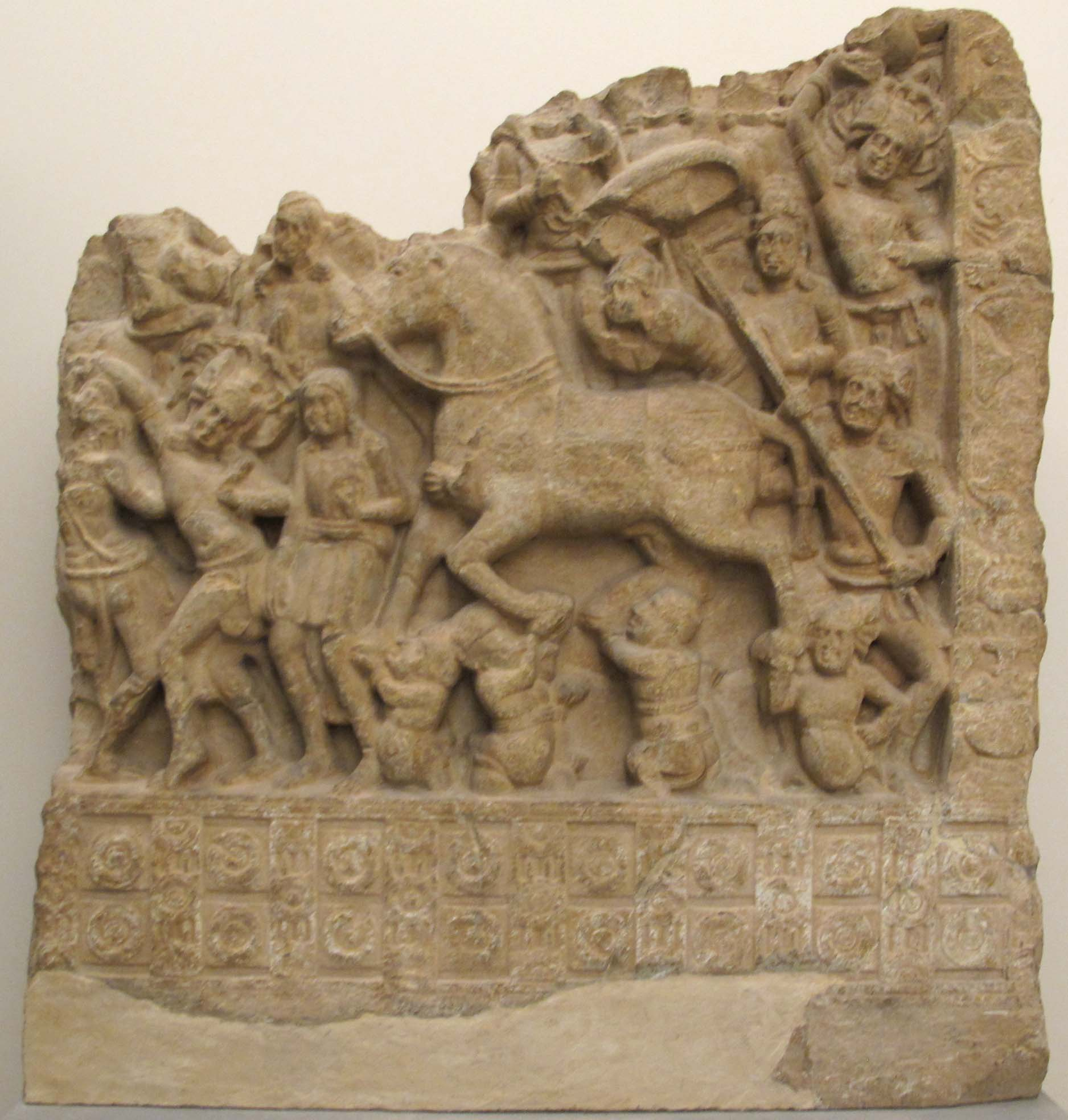
Andhra attire, Amaravati style

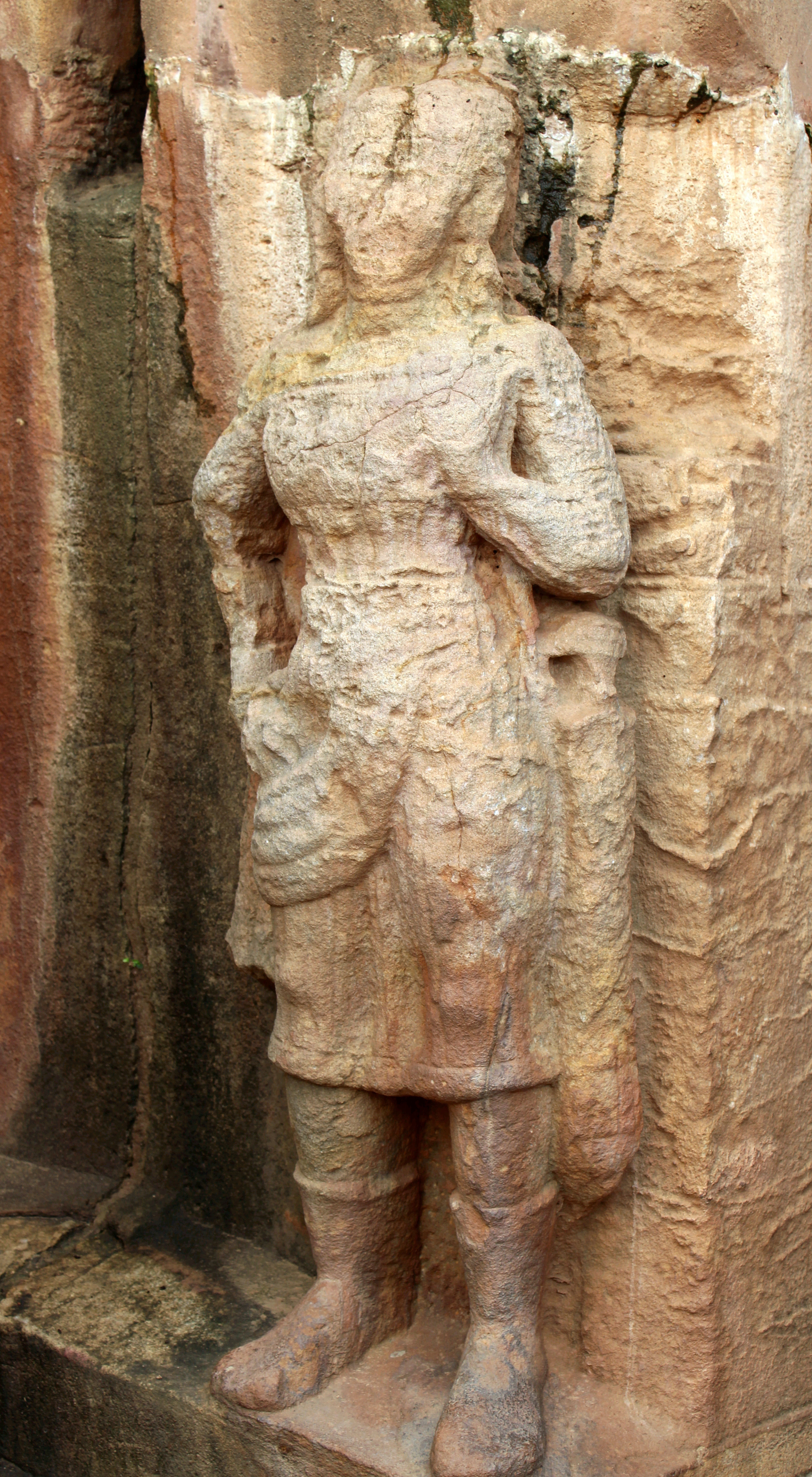
Warrior wearing Achkan or long coat or chiton, and boots from Udayagiri and Khandagiri Caves, Orissa, 2nd century BCE

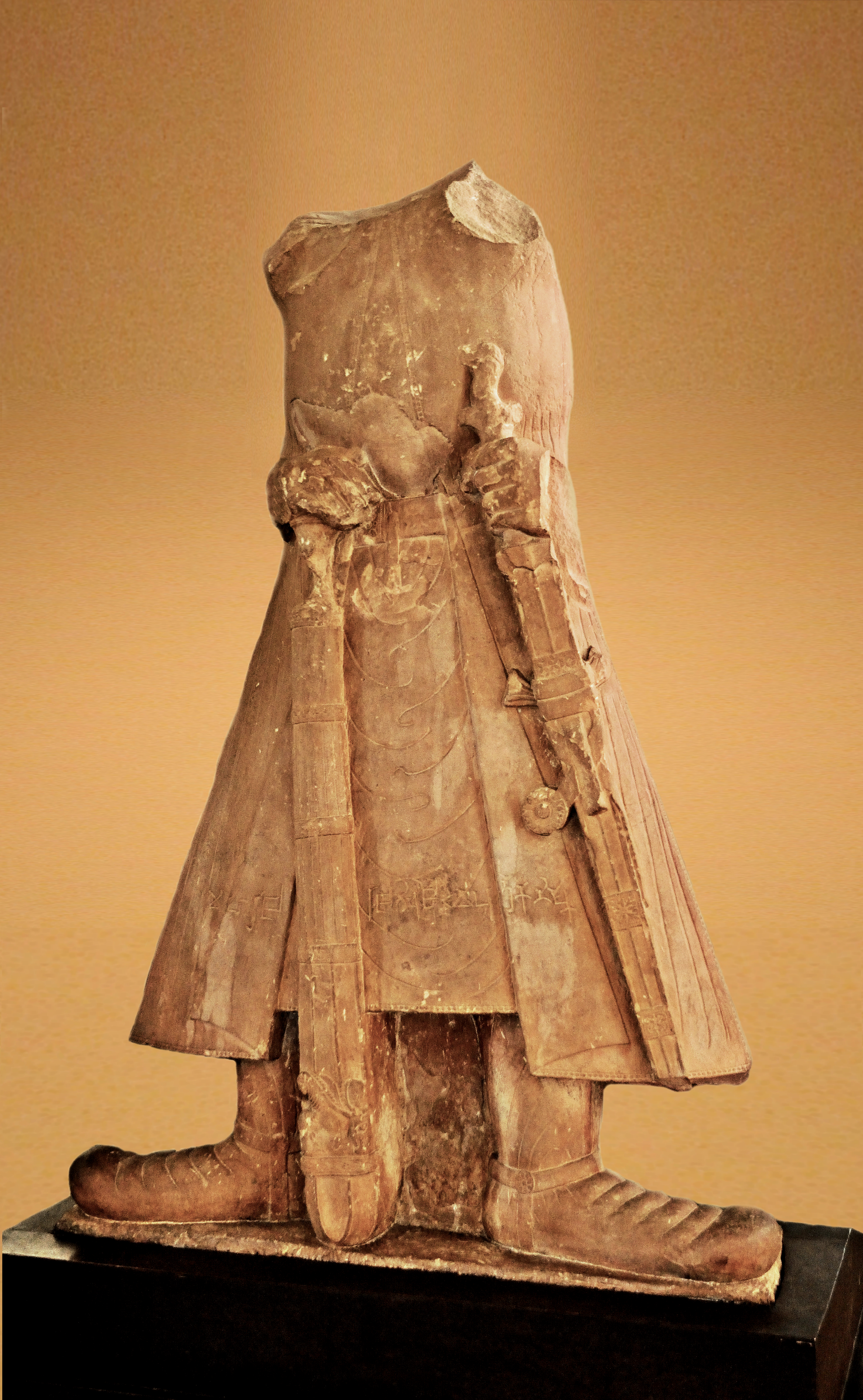
Kushan emperor Kanishka, 2nd century CE, from Mat near Mathura, wearing Achkan, sash and outer coat

=== Gupta period ===
The Gupta period lasted from 320 CE to 550 CE. Chandragupta I was the founder of this empire. Stitched garments became very popular in this period. Stitched garments became a sign of royalty.

The antariya worn by the women turned into gagri, which has many swirling effects exalted by its many folds. Hence dancers used to wear it a lot. As it is evident from many Ajanta paintings, women used to wear only the lower garment in those times, leaving the bust part bare but these depictions may be a stylistic representation of mother goddess cult since Indus Valley Civilisation. Whereas women with stitched upper body garment or tunic have been shown from pre-Mauryan period as early as 400 BCE in a folk art depicted on Pazyryk rattling mirrors. Ujjain coin from 200 BCE depicts a man wearing achkan. Depictions from terracotta clay tablets from Chandraketugarh show women wearing clothes made of muslin. Various kinds of blouses (cholis) evolved. Some of them had strings attached leaving the back open while others were used to tie from the front side, exposing the midriff.

Clothing in the Gupta period was mainly cut and sewn garments. A long sleeved brocaded tunic became the main costume for privileged people like the nobles and courtiers. The main costume for the king was most often a blue closely woven silk antariya, perhaps with a block printed pattern. In order to tighten the antariya, a plain belt took the position of kayabandh. Mukatavati (necklace which has a string with pearls), kayura (armband), kundala (earring), kinkini (small anklet with bells), mekhala (pendant hung at the centre, also known as katisutra), nupura (anklet made of beads) were some of the ornaments made of gold, used in that time. There was extensive use of ivory during that period for jewellery and ornaments.

During the Gupta period, men used to have long hair along with beautiful curls and this style was popularly known as gurna kuntala style. In order to decorate their hair, they sometimes put headgear, a band of fabric around their hairs. On the other hand, women used to decorate their hair with luxuriant ringlets or a jewelled band or a chaplet of flowers. They often used to make a bun on the top of the head or sometimes low on the neck, surrounded by flowers or ratnajali (bejewelled net) or muktajala (net of pearls).

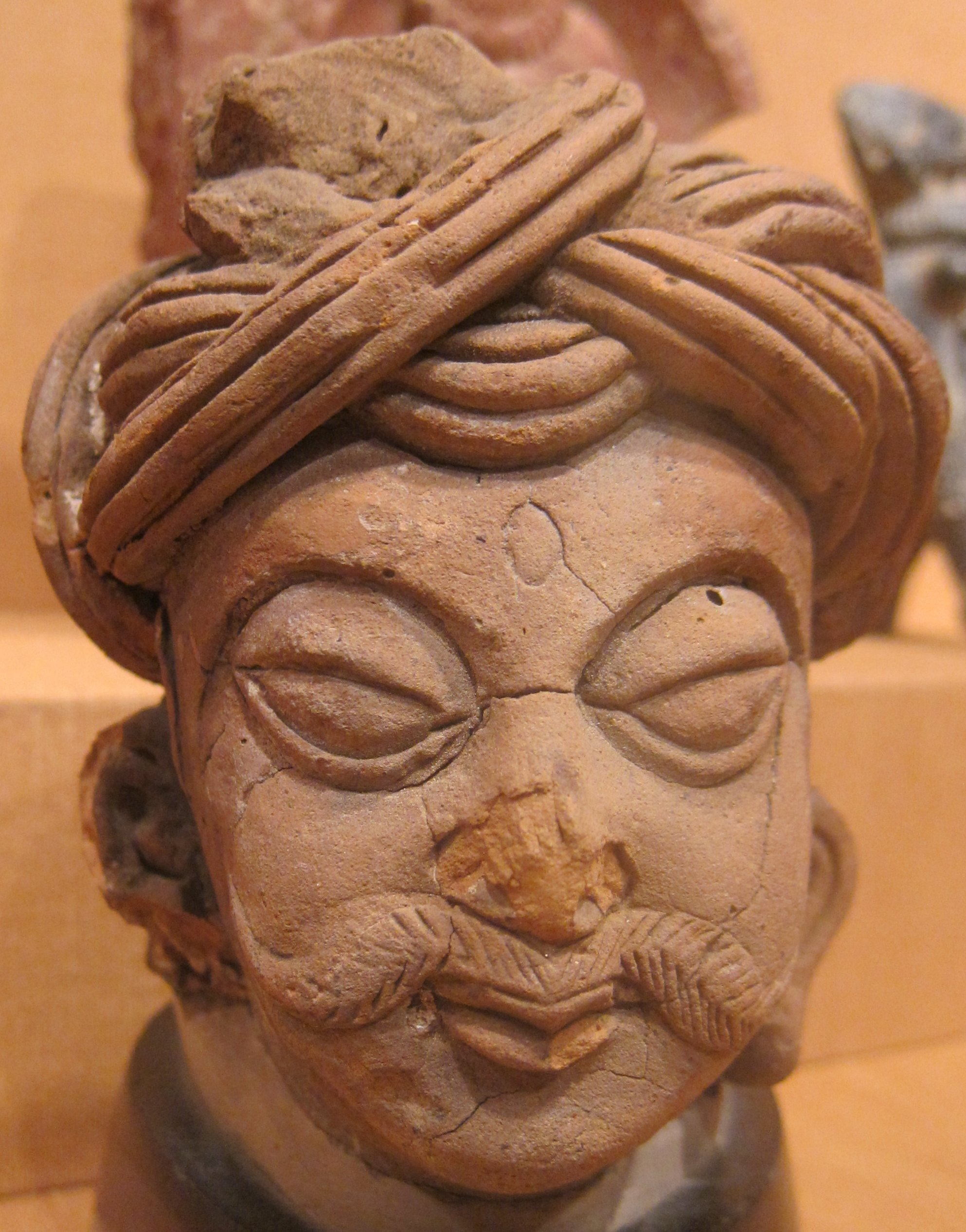
Terracotta head, wearing possibly an early form of pagri from the Gupta period

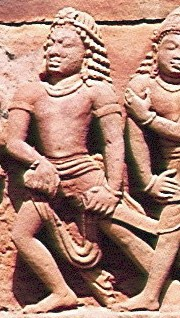
Male warrior holding broad sword wearing dhoti and arm bracelets; Gupta era statues

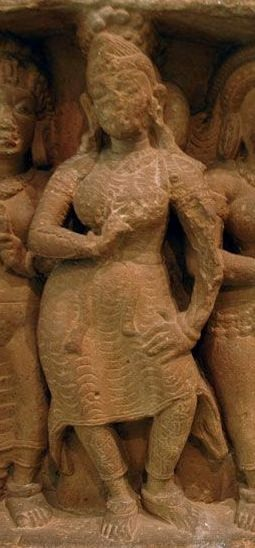
Ancient form of Kurta with side slits and Churidar worn during the Gupta period

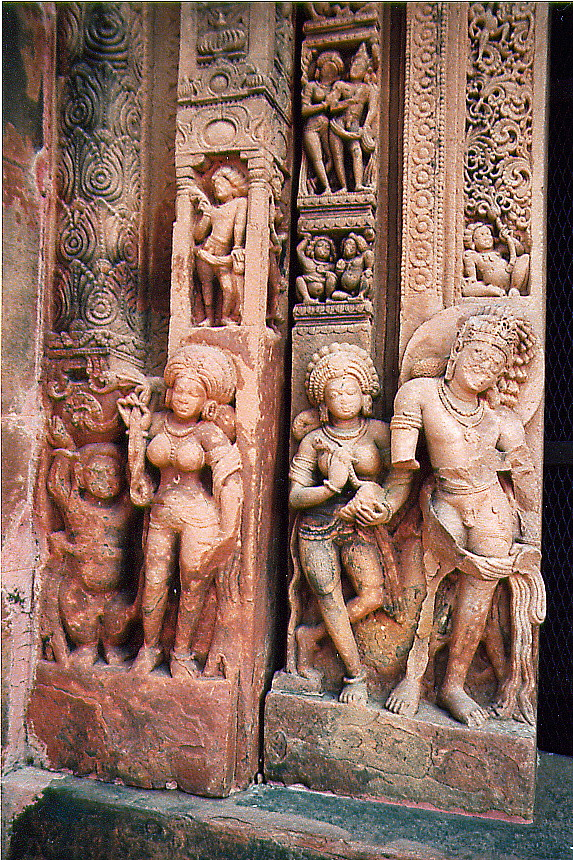
Females statues wearing drapes dipected at Dashavatara Temple

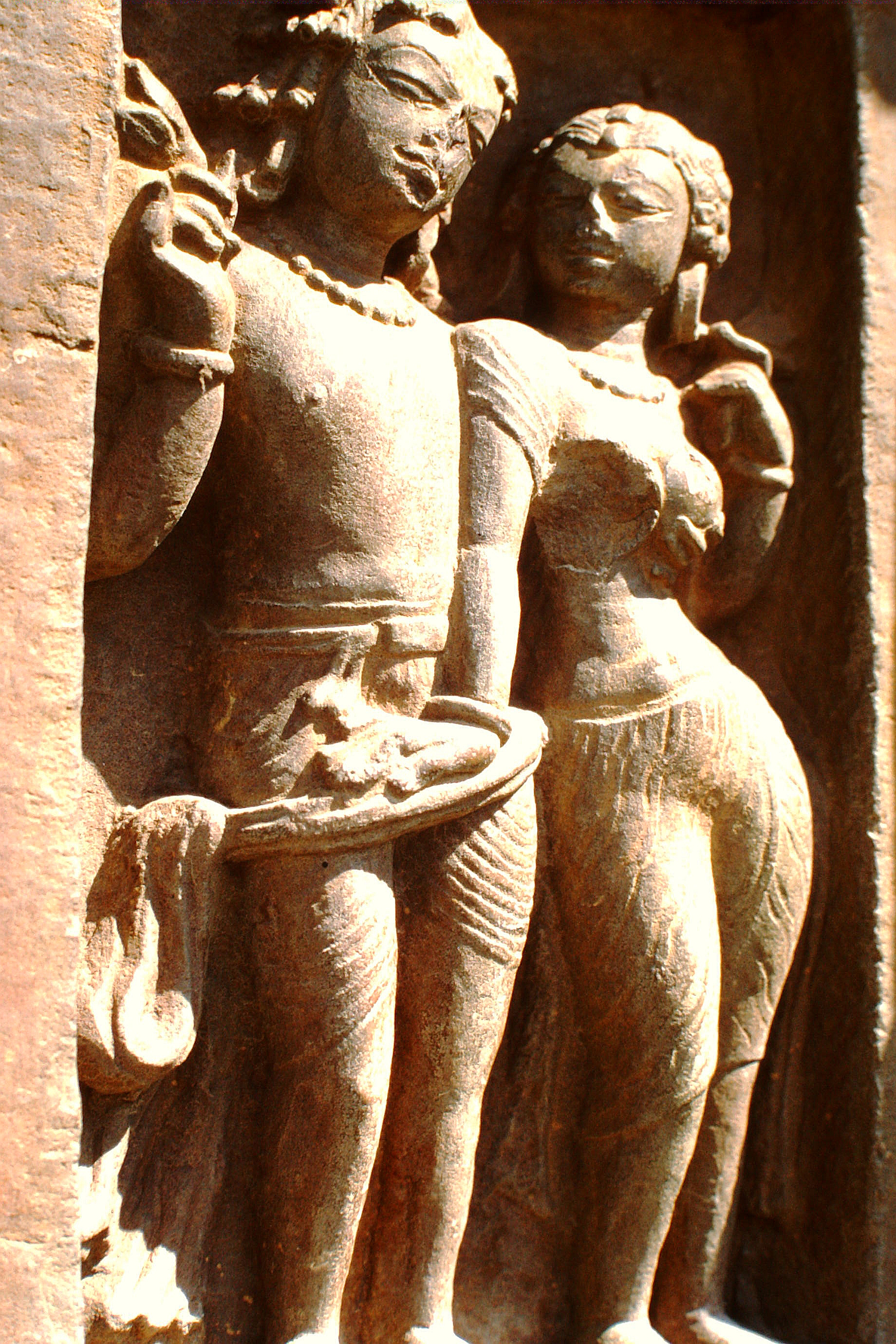
Male and female statues wearing drapes at Nachna Hindu temples

=== In south ===
==== Chalukyas of vatapi ====
Chalukyas of vatapi have unique clothing, they wore veshti in different styles sometimes veshti goes under knees. The uniqueness of jewelleries is the presence of thigh band.

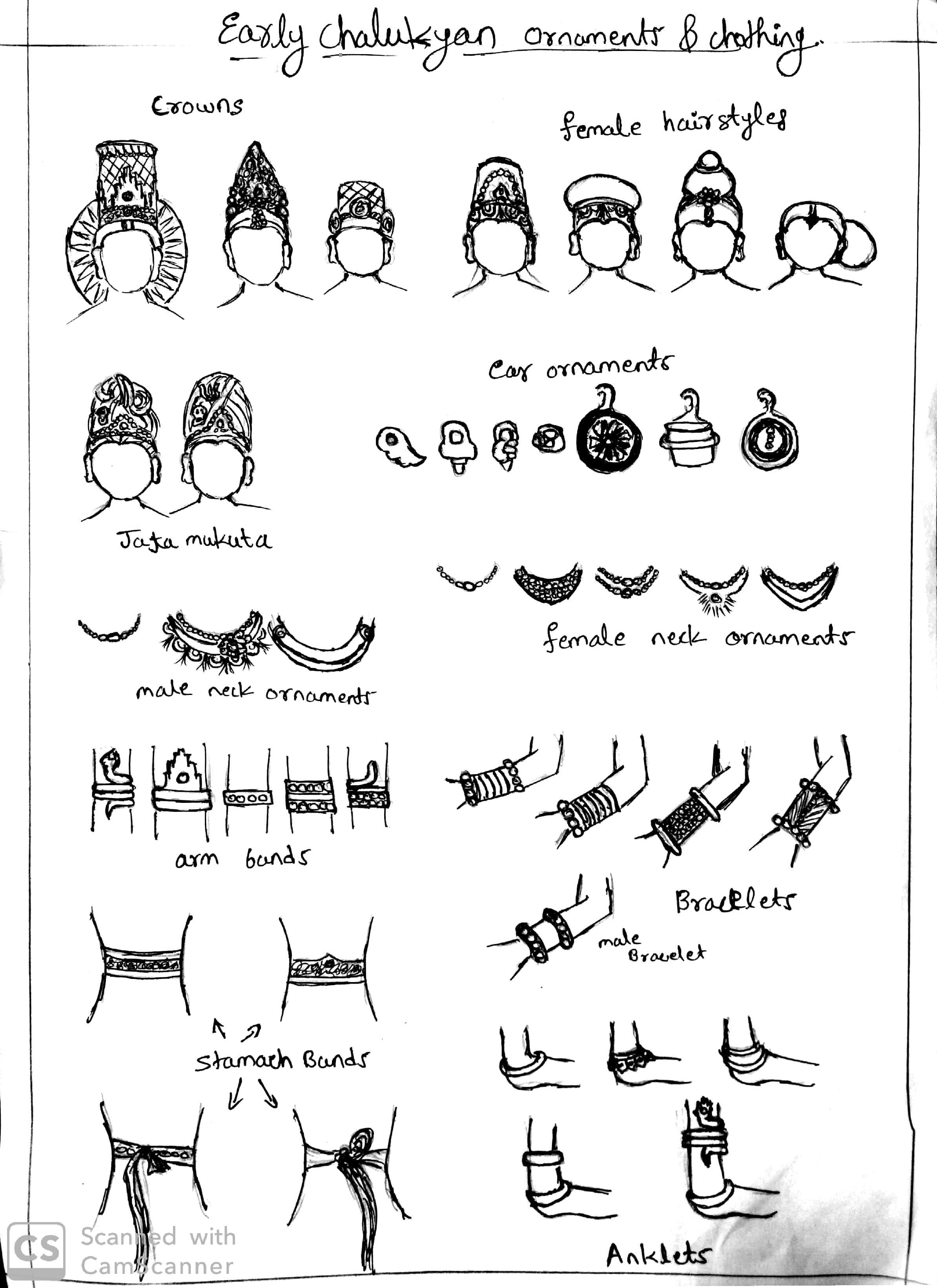
Jewelleries worn by people in early chalukyan era as showed in badami cave Temples

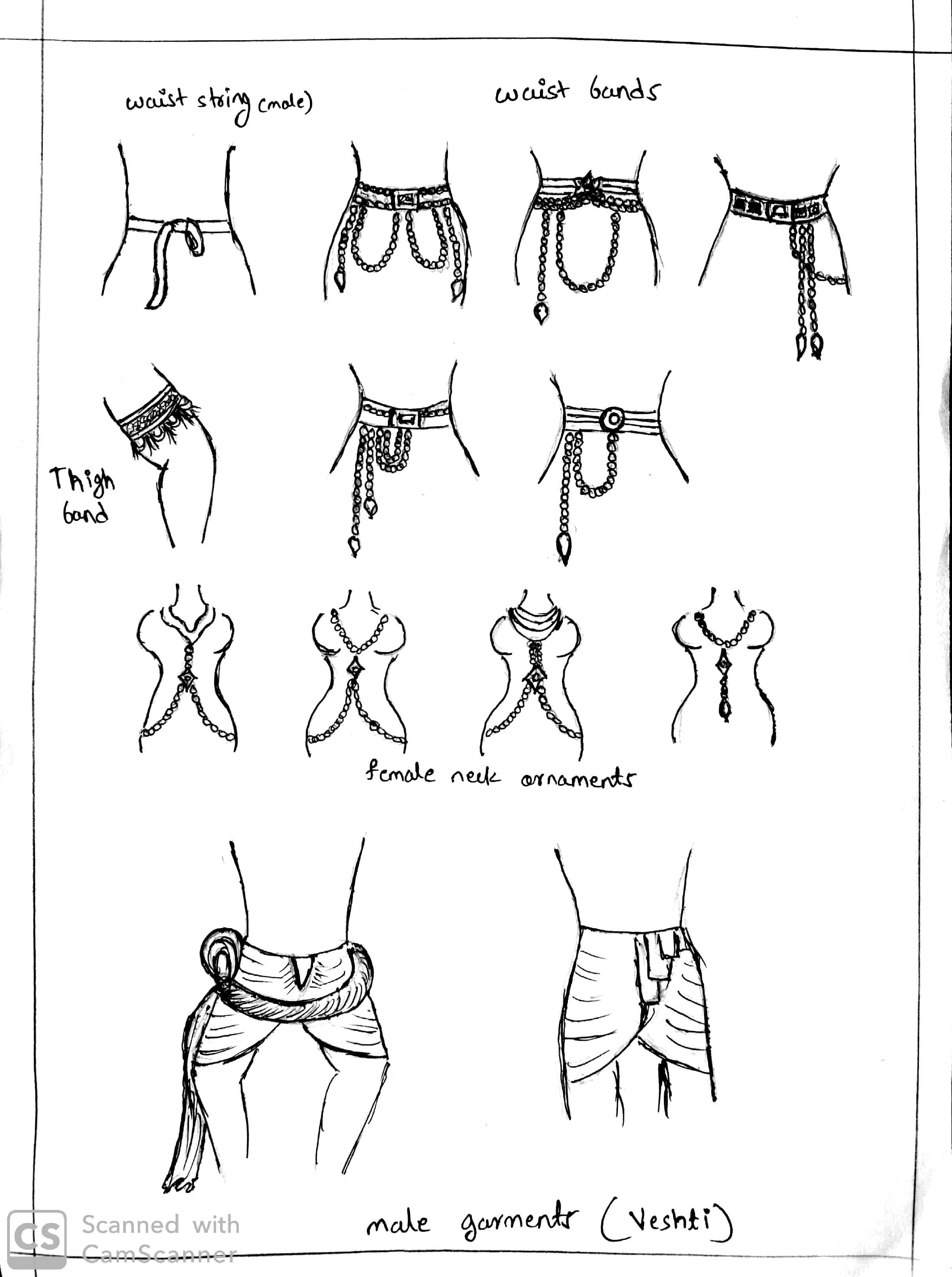
Jewelleries and clothing in early chalukyan era as sculptured in badami cave Temples

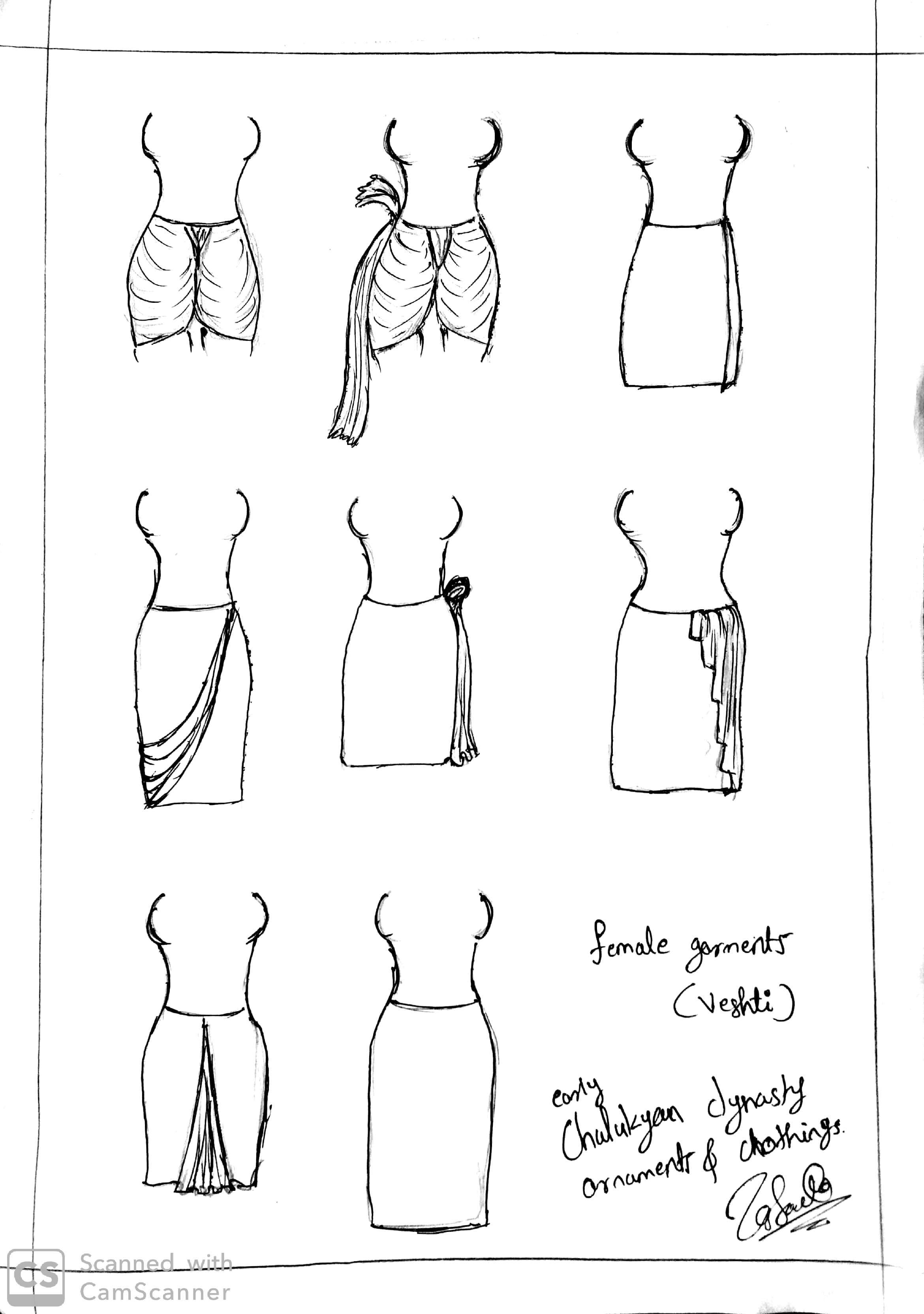
Female veshtis of badami chalukyas

== Medieval period ==
From post-Gupta period, there is plentiful evidence of Indian clothing from paintings such as in Alchi monastery, Bagan temples, Pala miniature paintings, Jain miniature paintings, Ellora caves paintings and Indian sculptures. Ancient Indians wearing kurta and baggy pants like shalwar have been depicted in 8-10th century CE ivory sculpture of an elephant chess piece from Bibliothèque Nationale, Paris, France. From the Late medieval period, there are increased evidences of pajamas and shalwar becoming common in Indian attire while unstitched dhoti keeps its prominence as well. From Al-Biruni's Tarikh ul Hind. The kurtas, which are called Kurtakas in Sanskrit, are half sleeved shirts with slits of both sides are described along with other clothing such as Kurpasaka which is a type of jacket similar to kurta, he also mentions that some Indians preferred dhoti while others dressed more by wearing baggy trousers similar to shalwar. The Alchi painting also shows evidence of modern sari draping and Bagan temple paintings frequently depict Indians with long beards wearing big earring. Paintings from regions of the Indian subcontinent, including Bihar, Bengal, Indus Valley and Nepal depict various clothing attires of eastern Indian states including modern styles of wearing dupatta.

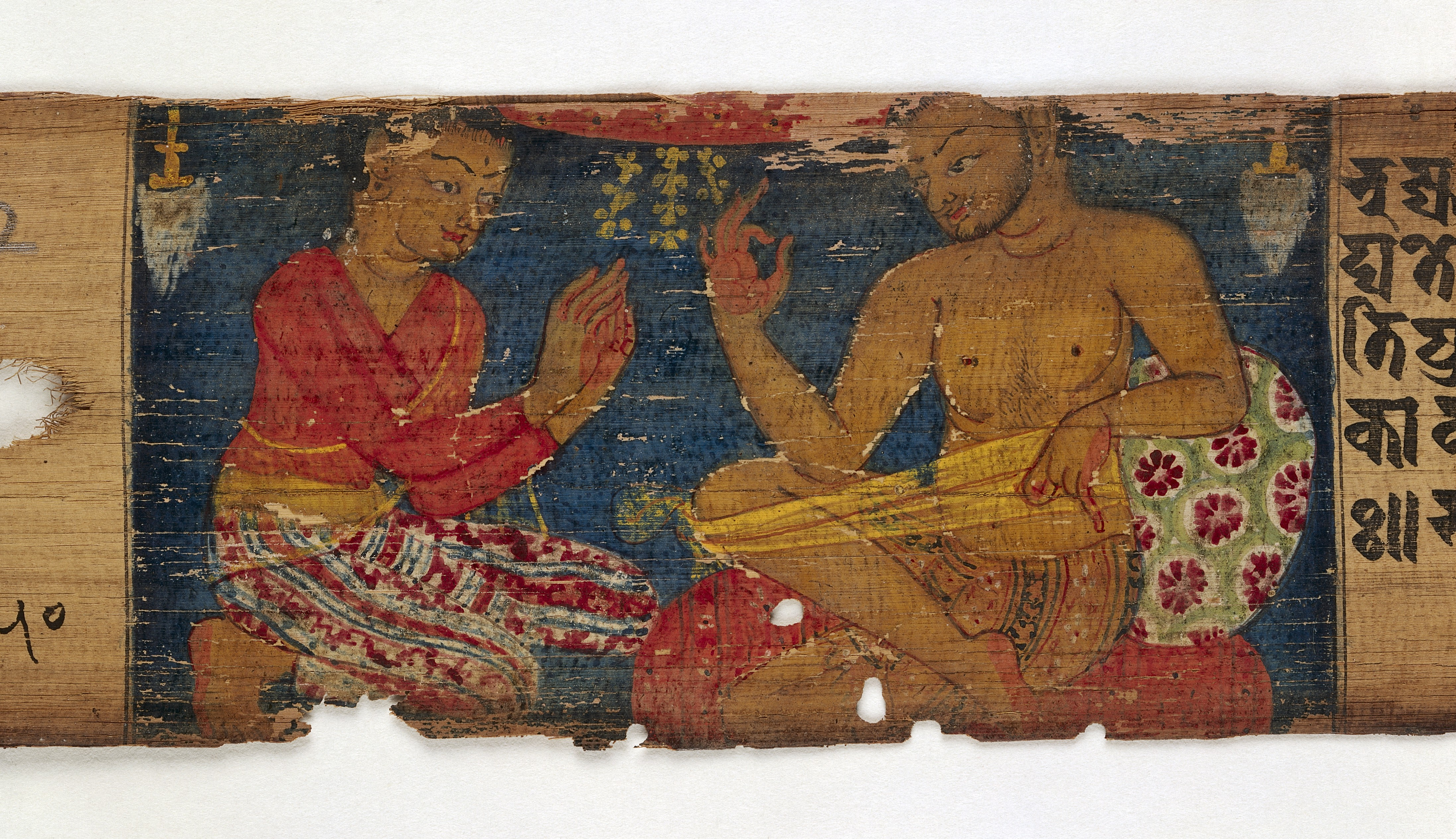
A teacher and a pupil. 11-12th-century palm leaf painting in eastern India.

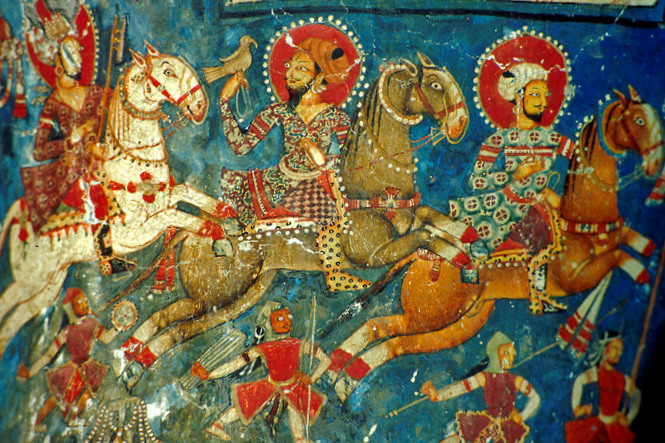
Rajput soldiers depicted in Alchi Monastery; 11th century CE.

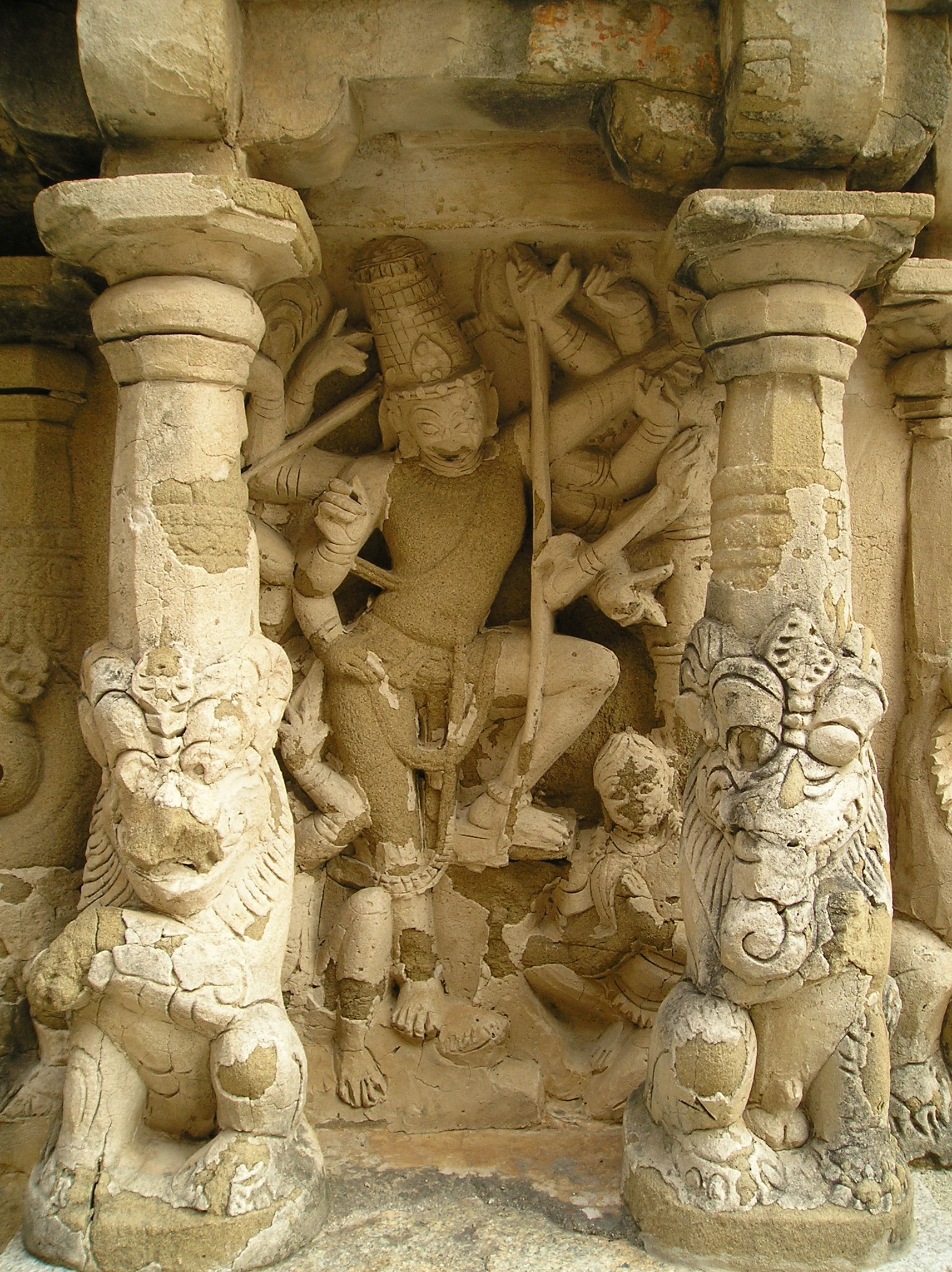
Large conical Pallava hat 705 CE

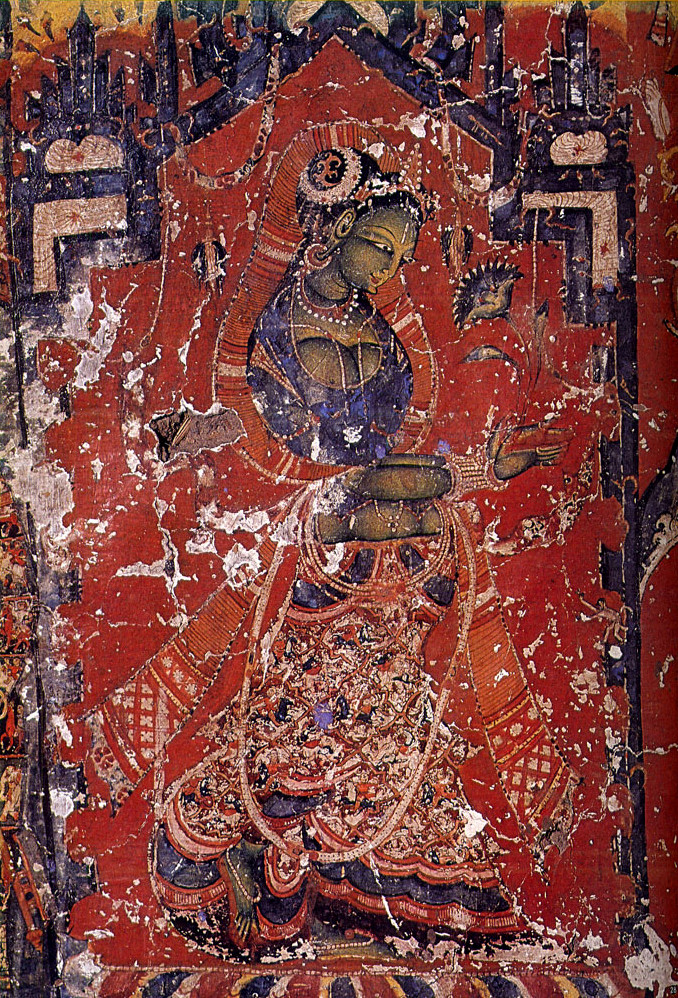
Painting of a Shyama Tara with a three-piece sari from Alchi Monastery

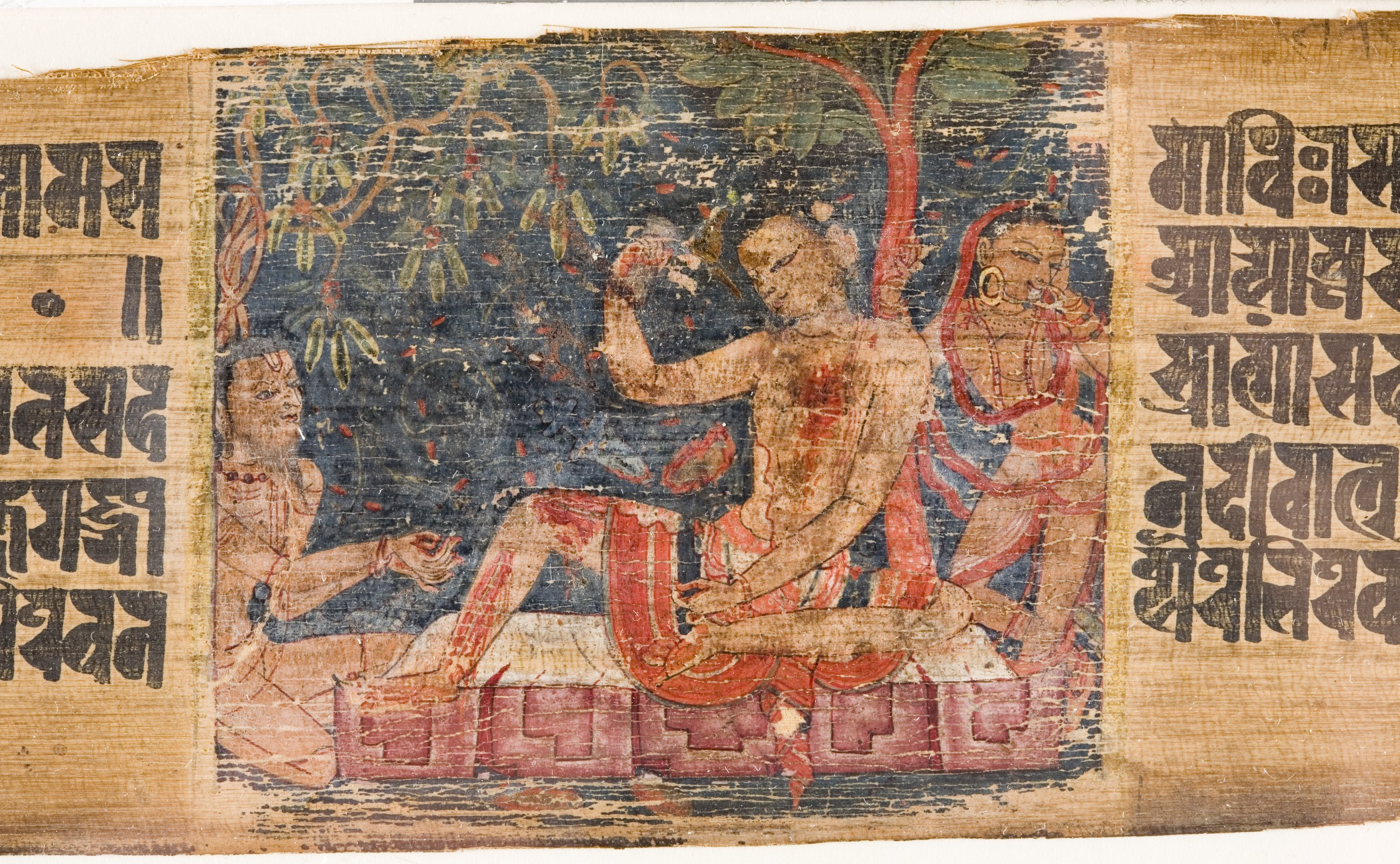
Ladies wearing muslin dupatta in a 12-13th century CE Buddhist manuscript

== Early Modern period ==
=== Mughal Empire ===
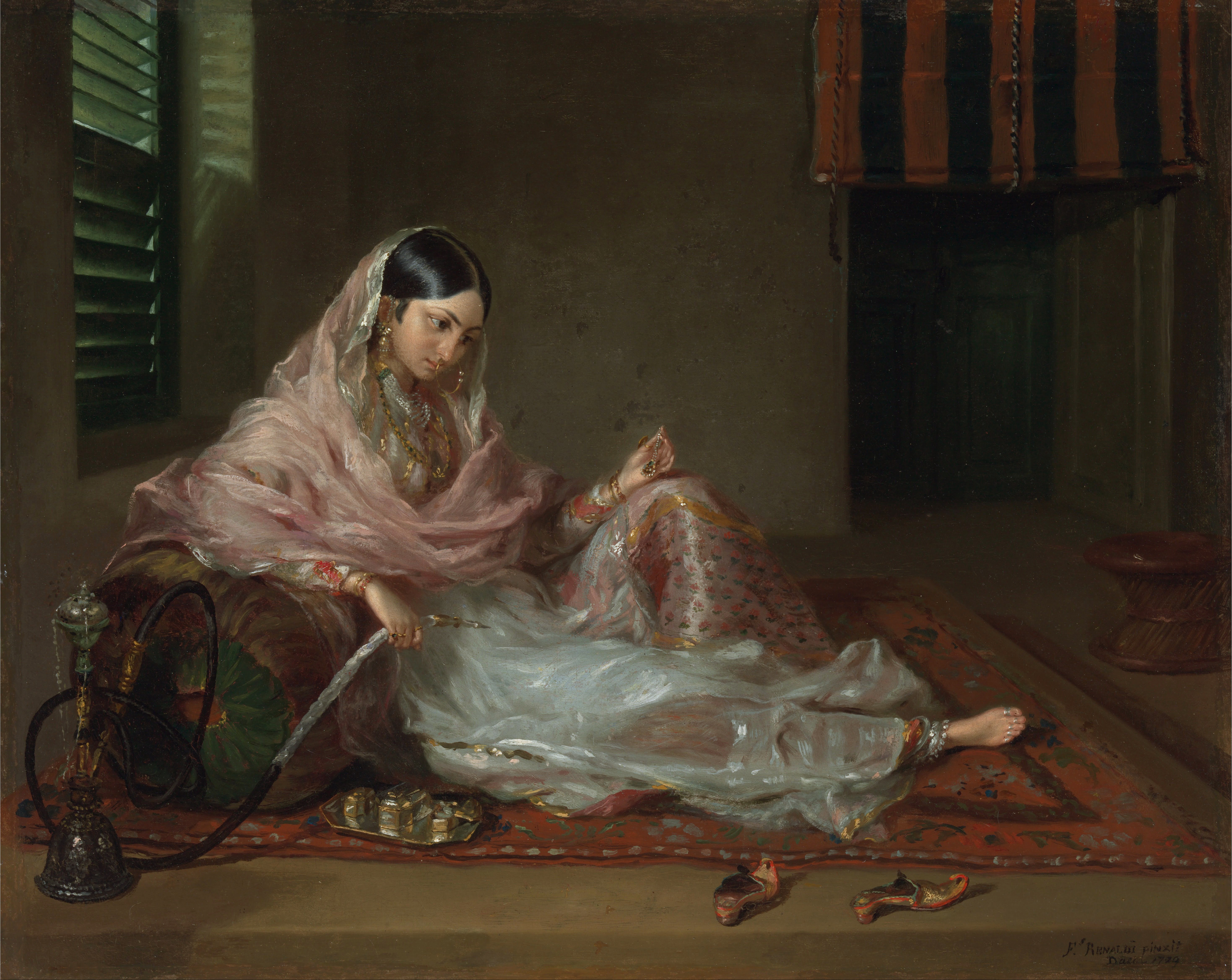
A woman in Bengal region of the Indian subcontinent, clad in fine Bengali muslin, 18th century

The Mughal dynasty included luxury clothes that complemented interest in art and poetry. Both men and women were fond of jewellery. Clothing fibres generally included muslins of three types: Ab-e-Rawan (running water), Baft Hawa (woven air) and Shabnam (evening dew) and the other fibres were silks, velvets and brocades. Mughal royal dresses consisted of many parts as listed below. Mughal women wore a large variety of ornaments from head to toe. Their costumes generally included Pajama, Churidar, Shalwar, Garara and the Farshi, they all included head ornaments, anklets, and necklaces. This was done as a distinctive mark of their prosperity and their rank in society.

During the Mughal period, there was an extensive tradition of wearing embroidered footwear, with ornamented leather and decorated with the art of Aughi. Lucknow footwear was generally favoured by nobles and kings.

=== Rajputs ===
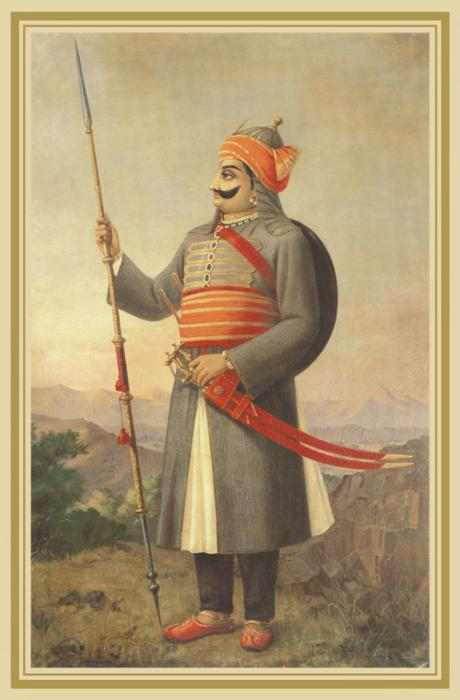
Maharana Pratap with Rajput-style clothing

Rajputs emerged in the 7th and 8th century as a community of Ancient Kshatriya people. Rajputs followed a traditional lifestyle for living which shows their martial spirit, ethnicity, and chivalric grandeur.

==== Men ====
Rajput's main costumes were the aristocratic dresses (court-dress) which includes angarkhi, pagdi, chudidar pyjama and a cummerbund (belt). Angarkhi (short jacket) is long upper part of garments which they used to wear over a sleeveless close-fitting cloth. Nobles of Ahirs generally attired themselves in the Jama, Shervani as an upper garment and Salvar, Churidar-Pyjama (a pair of shaped trousers) as lower garments. The Dhoti was also in tradition in that time but styles were different to wear it. Tevata style of dhoti was prominent in the desert region and Tilangi style in the other regions. Ahir style dhoti were give royal look .

==== Women ====
"To capture the sensuality of the female figures in Rajput paintings, women were depicted wearing transparent fabrics draped around their bodies". Rajput women's main attire was the Sari (wrapped over whole body and one of the ends thrown on the right shoulder) or Lengha related with the Rajasthani traditional dress. On the occasion (marriage) women preferred Angia. After marriage of Kanchli, Kurti, and angia were the main garb of women. The young girls used to wear the Puthia as an upper garment made of pure cotton fabric and the Sulhanki as lower garments (loose pajama). Widows and unmarried women clothed themselves with Polka (half sleeved which ends at the waist) and Ghaghra as a voluminous gored skirt made of line satin, organza or silk. Another important part of clothing is Odhna of women which are worked in silk.

Jewellery preferred by women were exquisite in the style or design. One of the most jewellery called Rakhdi (head ornament), Machi-suliya (ears) and Tevata, Pattia, and the aad (all is necklace). Rakhdi, nath and chuda show the married woman's status. The footwear is the same for men and women and named Juti made of leather.

=== Sikhs ===
Sikhism was founded in the 15th century. In 1699, the last guru of Sikhism, Guru Gobind Singh mandated Khalsa Sikh men to have uncut hair for their lives, which they wear into a turban or dastar. The dastar has since then been an integral part of the Sikh culture.

== British colonial period ==
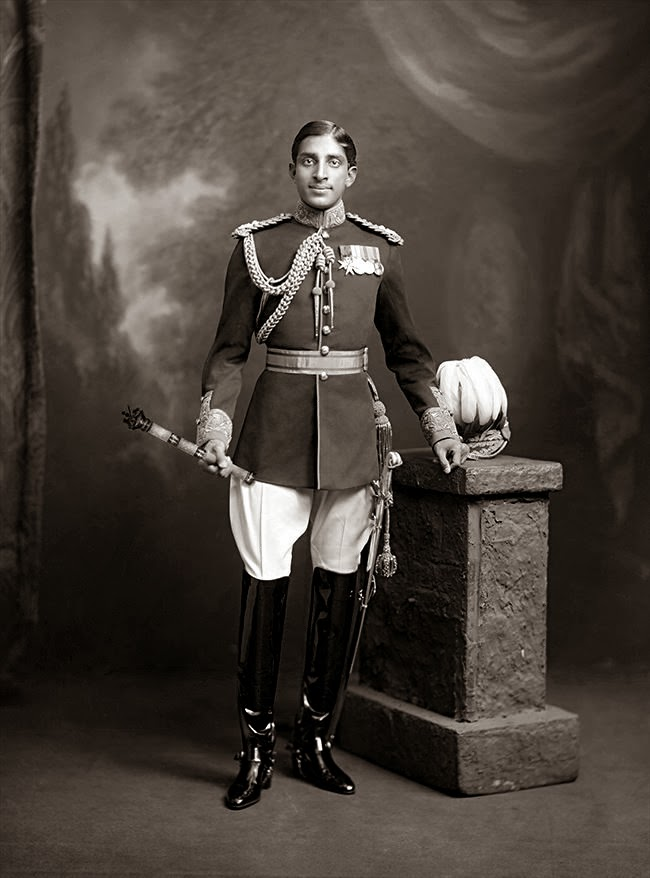
Tukojirao Holkar III, the Maharaja Holkar of Indore, wearing a British-styled dress uniform

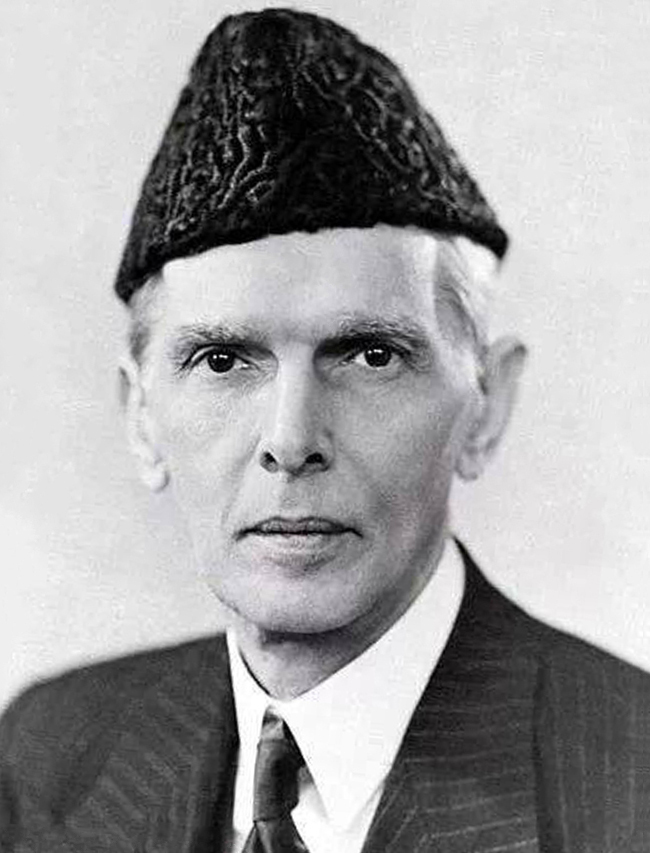
Muhammad Ali Jinnah wearing a suit and a jinnah cap, c. 1945.

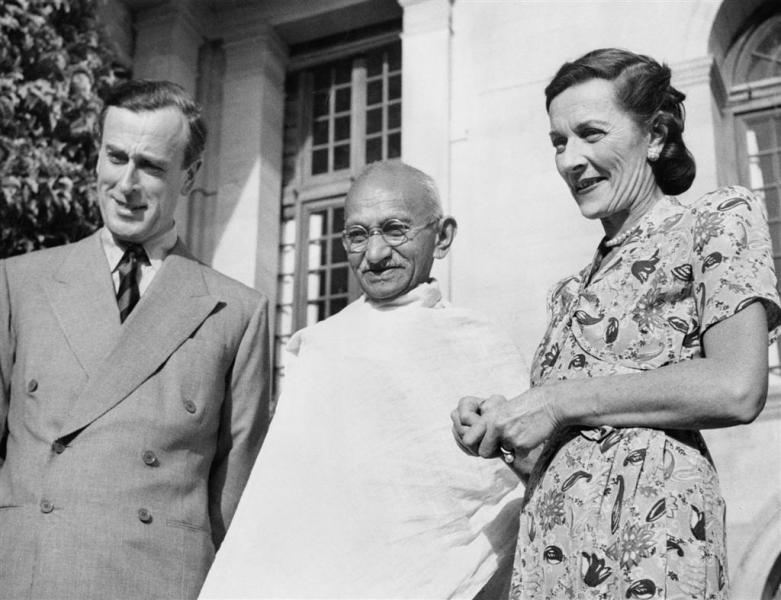
Mahatma Gandhi with the Mountbattens, c. 1947. Gandhi's signature dress of a white shawl and dhoti, which he wove himself, was a symbol of self-reliance.

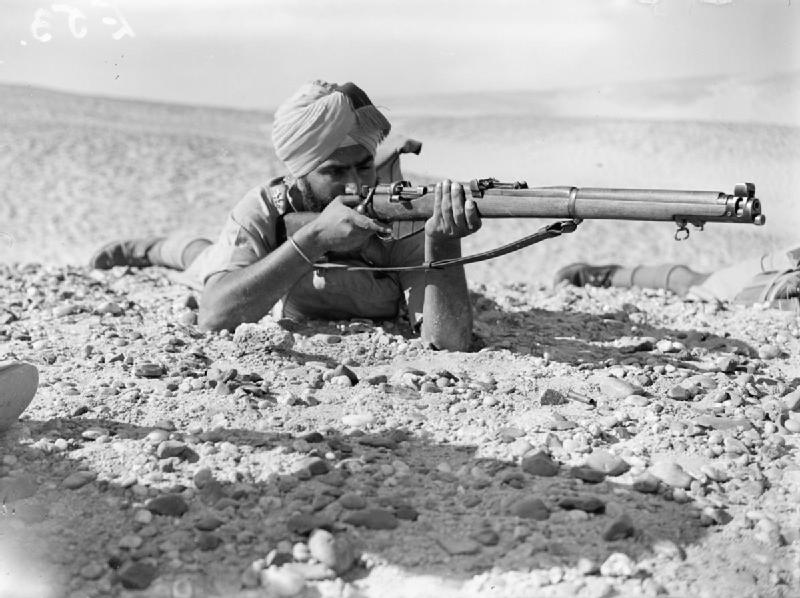
A Sikh soldier during the second World War, c.1940. The uniform allowed turbans for Sikhs, as is mandated in their religion.

During the British colonial period, Indian clothing went through many changes and began to reflect an evident European influence. The British had a strict set of rules for attire, as they viewed themselves as culturally superior. These new clothing norms arrived alongside new rules around government, education, and class structure.

Upper and middle-class Indian men wore western clothing in public, often doing so because it brought them closer to being equal with European men. At first, this included combining elements of Indian and Western clothing, as some men would wear a 'dhoti' (loose lower garment) with a shirt and coat. Others started wearing a sherwani, which fused together the British frock coat and an achkan. Eventually, some men started wearing full European styles, like a pantsuit. Although one major difference that remained between Indian and European men's fashion was the style and etiquette of head coverings. Some Indian men wore this for religious purposes, like turbans and phetas. For Indian men, it was important to wear this at all times in public, whereas European men would generally remove it. Thus, we see that Indian men’s fashion experienced changes through the fusion of cultures.

Women's clothing and fashion were also influenced by the British. They did not wear fully western clothes like men, but many started to wear petticoats and certain blouse styles under their saris. Both of these articles of clothing were brought to India by Europeans. These new articles of clothing also created some tension between castes. One major instance of this was in Kerala, where only upper-caste women were allowed to wear blouses. Though, from 1813 to 1859 the Channar Revolt was supported by Christian missionaries who wanted Indian women to wear blouses.

Another influence of the British on Indian women's clothing was the introduction of new materials. They started using mill-made cloth and other imported satins and artificial silks. A few reasons for using these new materials include that they were cheaper to produce and were more versatile than the cloth used in India. Sometimes these new styles were also more functional for Indian women. The adoption of these new textiles and styles was seen as a sign of upward mobility in British-Indian society.

The British also impacted the textile industry in India because of industrialisation and using their own mills instead of artisans in India. This led to the unemployment of many Indians. Later, Gandhi called for Indian people to make and wear their own hand-spun clothing, called khadi cloth, as a sign of resistance against the British. This was part of the Swadeshi movement. In fact, we can see that small-scale artisan clothing producers did not disappear from India during the 20th century as they continued to make up a significant share of industrial output.

== Post-Independence ==
Western clothing has gained increasing popularity, especially in the metropolitan cities. This has also led to the development of the Indo-Western style. Bollywood has also been a major influence in fashion around the subcontinent, especially in Indian fashion.

== Gallery ==
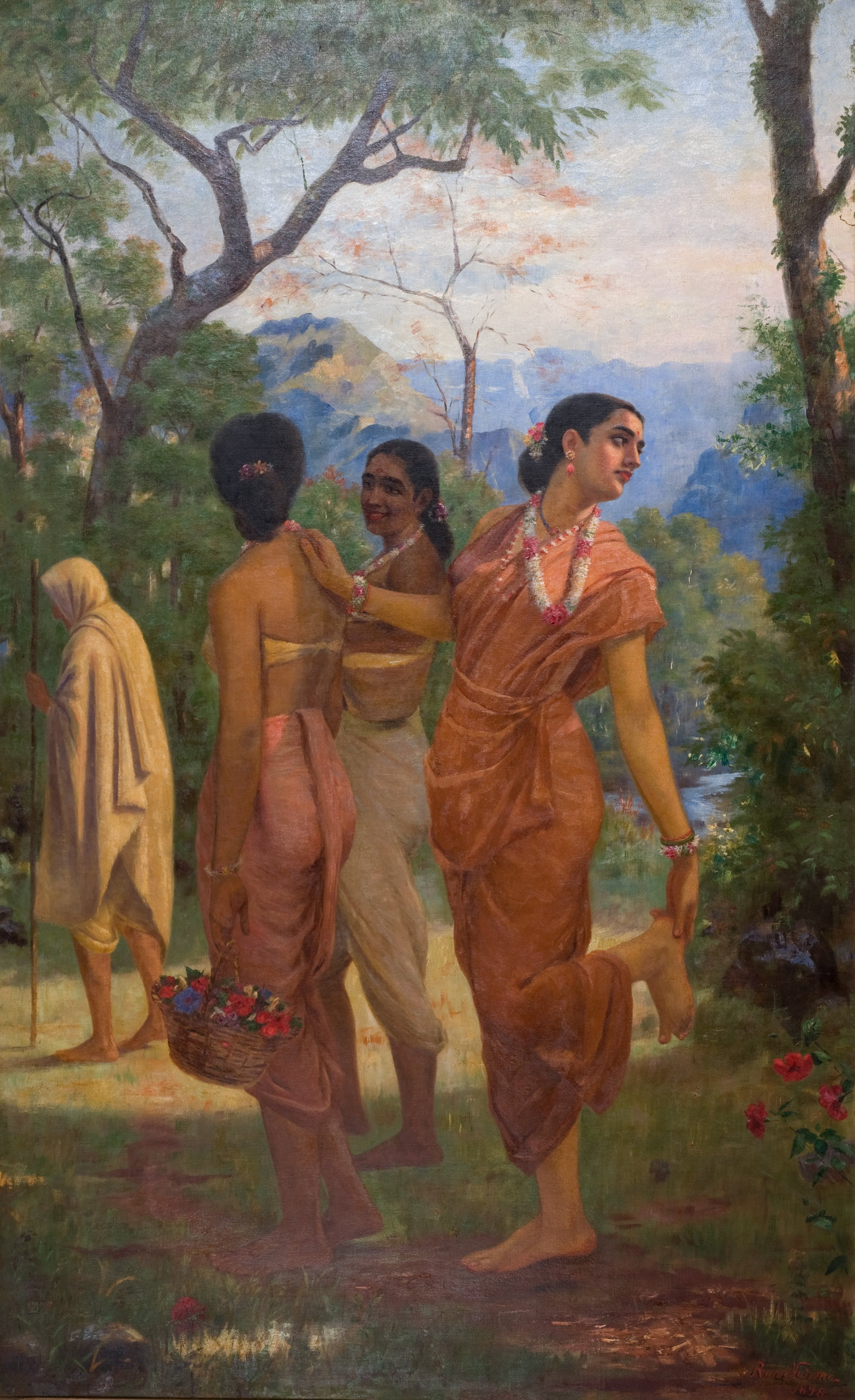
Shakuntala by Raja Ravi Varma, c. 1870. She is wearing a kasta sari.

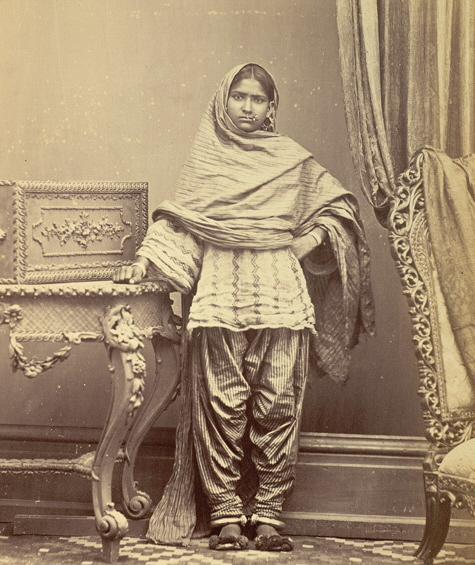
Portrait of a girl from Karachi, Sindh, in narrow Sindhi suthan and paro, c. 1870

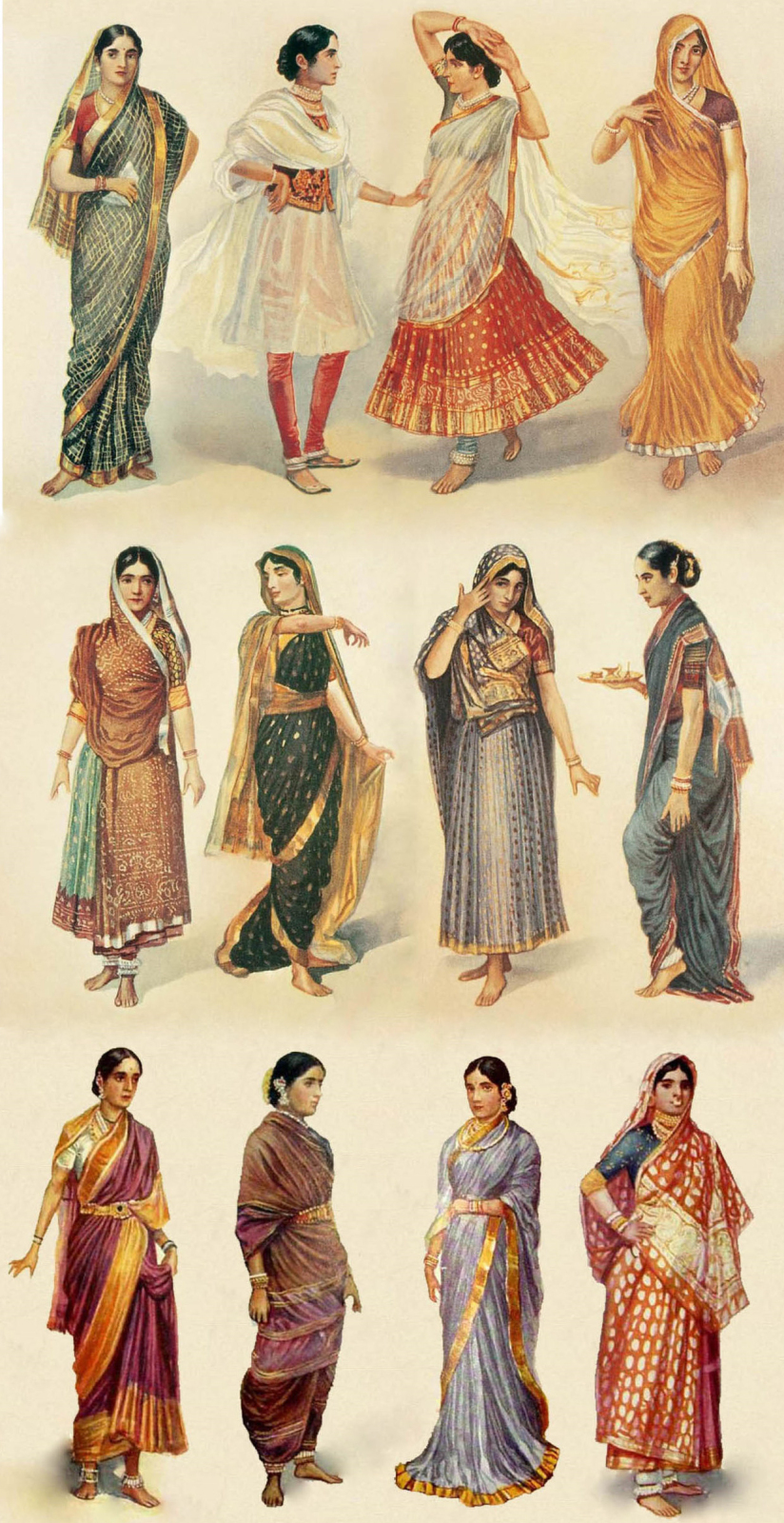
Illustration of different styles of sari, gagra choli and shalwar kameez worn by women in the Indian subcontinent, c. 1928

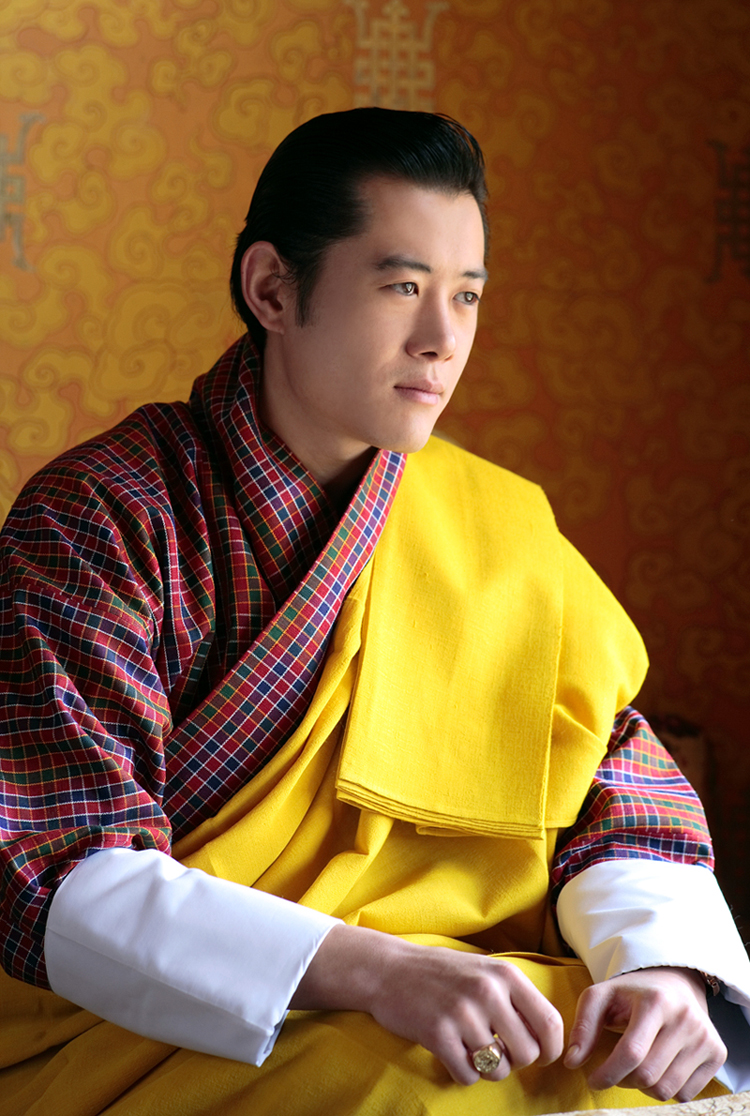
Jigme Khesar Namgyel Wangchuck, the fifth King of Bhutan, wearing a gho and royal saffron kabney, c. 2007

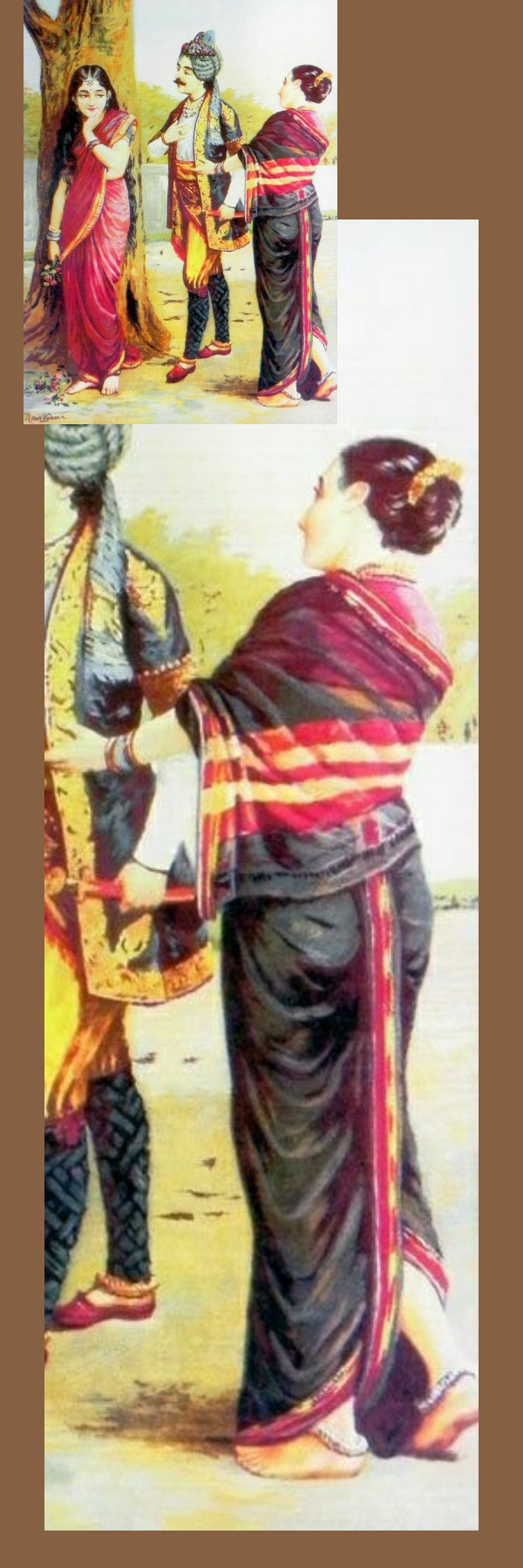
Picture shows saree draping style of North Karnataka by Raja Ravi Varma. Front side - shows nivi drape, front pleats tucked left to right manner in a pouch. Back side - kaccha.

== See also ==
- Textile industry of Bangladesh
- Clothing in India
- Folk costume
- History of Textile industry in India
- Indo-Western clothing
- Fashion in India
- 1950s in Indian fashion
- 1960s in Indian fashion
- 1970s in Eastern fashion
- 1980s in Indian fashion
- 1990s in Indian fashion
- 2000s in Asian fashion
- 2010s in Indian fashion
