= Angia (garment) =

Bodice of Indian origin

Angia (also angi, angiya, or anggiya) is an obsolete form of bodice or breast-cloth of Indian origin dating from the 19th century, covering the entire upper body from bust to waist and tied at the back. Very short sleeves, if any, and a high waist characterized the angia, which was made of fine cotton material such as muslin. Women in India wore it beneath dresses such as the peshwaj.

Francis Buchanan-Hamilton and Philip Meadows Taylor assert that stitched garments of this kind did not exist prior to the Muslim conquests in the Indian subcontinent.

== Style ==
The angia, an early version of the modern ladies' blouse, was completely enclosed in front and contoured to the bosom. Its backside was tied with strings or ribbons across the shoulder and below the bosom line; yet, unlike other tight inner garments such as corsets, it merely covered the bosom without supporting the back. Both Hindus and Muslims wore it.

The Ahir woman in Haryana was easily identifiable by her angia, lehnga (similar to a ghagri but shorter), and orhni. In Punjab, women wore angia of colored cloth.

=== Artwork ===
In a Johan Zoffany 1785 painting that still survives in the India Office Records in London, Fyze Palmer (Mughal wife Fyze Baksh) can be seen, barefoot and dressed in traditional Lucknavi court attire: "a magnificent saffron Peshwaz and dupatta over a brief angia."

== See also ==
- Ekpatta
- Pratidhi
- Stanapatta
- Nivi (garment)
