= Shaluka =

Type of Kurti

Shaluka (an under jacket) was a ladies' garment, a sleeveless tunic with a hip-length worn over a short, tight bodice called a kanchli or angiya. It was a part of the court costume of orient culture. The shape was like a half-sleeve kurta or tunic (similar to a waistcoat), reaching up to mid-thigh that could be worn under other garments.

== Style ==
Women wore Shaluka under the peshwaj (the long gowns) over the bodice and the whole outfit would be topped by a large, light, rectangular veil or shawl called an odhni. It was worn in place of the bodice, with buttons in front. Buttons were added later after the European influence on the native costumes.

== See also ==
- Camisole
- Chemise
- Smock-frock
