= Peshwaj =

Long-gown-like dress

Peshwaz (peshwaj, paswaj, tilluck, dress) was a ladies outfit similar to a gown. It was a Bengali ladies outfit, often historically worn by present-day Bangladeshi and West Bengali women in the courts of Dhaka and Murshidabad. One example of a peshwaz dress is seen in Francesco Renaldi's painting, also known as "Muslim Lady Reclining" in present day Dhaka Bangladesh, in the Bengal presidency. Another example of a peshwaz is seen in the Victoria and Albert's Museum, also made of Dhaka Muslin. It consisted of a long floor length structure, fitted bodice and a flared skirt. The sleeves were often slim and elongated. Peshwaz was one of the magnificent costumes of the Mughal and Nawab court ladies. The material was sheer and used fine Dhaka muslins with decorated borders of zari and lacework. Peshwaz suit often considered the ancestor of modern day Anarkali suit which is almost always identical in appearance.

== Style ==
The ladies' attire was a combination of Peshwaj, trousers, decorative patka, a cap (edged with lace or brocade), shaluka, angia (bodice) and an odhani to cover the upper part of the body and head. The central opening of Peshwaj was covered by the phentas tucked in at the waist. The Mughal Paintings depicted ladies wearing various outfits such as Peshwaj and heavy jewelry. It was a famous costume in the 17th century for both Hindu and Muslim ladies.

Peshwaj was paired with Ekpatta.

== Mentions ==
There are eleven types of such coats are mentioned in the Ain-i-Akbari, Abu'l-Fazl ibn Mubarak explained Takauchiyah was a coat with round skirt tied on the right side. And Peshwaj, as an open in front and tied in front. Added to the same there were sixty ornamental stitches for these royal coats.

== Present ==
New dress evolved from the Peshwaz called the Anarkali, named after a royal courtesan (although historically Anarkali did not exist). The Anarkali is a much-rebranded and appreciated costume for wedding ceremonies in India and Bangladesh and Pakistan. Bhakhtawar Bhutto wore a pink Anarkali dress at her engagement. Soha Ali Khan wore Ritu Kumar designed Peshwaz dress at her Mehndi. Khushi Kapoor was praised when she donned the dress designed by Manish Malhotra. And Bengali Indian designer Sabyasachi has long standing history with V&A, he custom-designed a massive heavily embroidered gold and red Zardozi wedding Peshwaz specifically to be displayed like piece of historical art.

== See also ==
- Shaluka
- Jama (coat)
