= Ekpatta =

Veil; simple loose draped garment similar to Dupatta

Ekpatta was a veil, a simple loose draped garment similar to Dupatta. Ekpatta was made of fine fabric like muslin, a single breadth of fabric that was six cubits long and three cubits wider. It was frequently embellished with silver or gold lace work around the edges. Dresses such as peshwaj were worn with ekpatta.

== Name ==
''Ekpatta'' is a combined word of Ek and Patta, ''Patta'' refers to cloth, and ''Ek'' means single.
