= Nehru jacket =

Indian style suit jacket

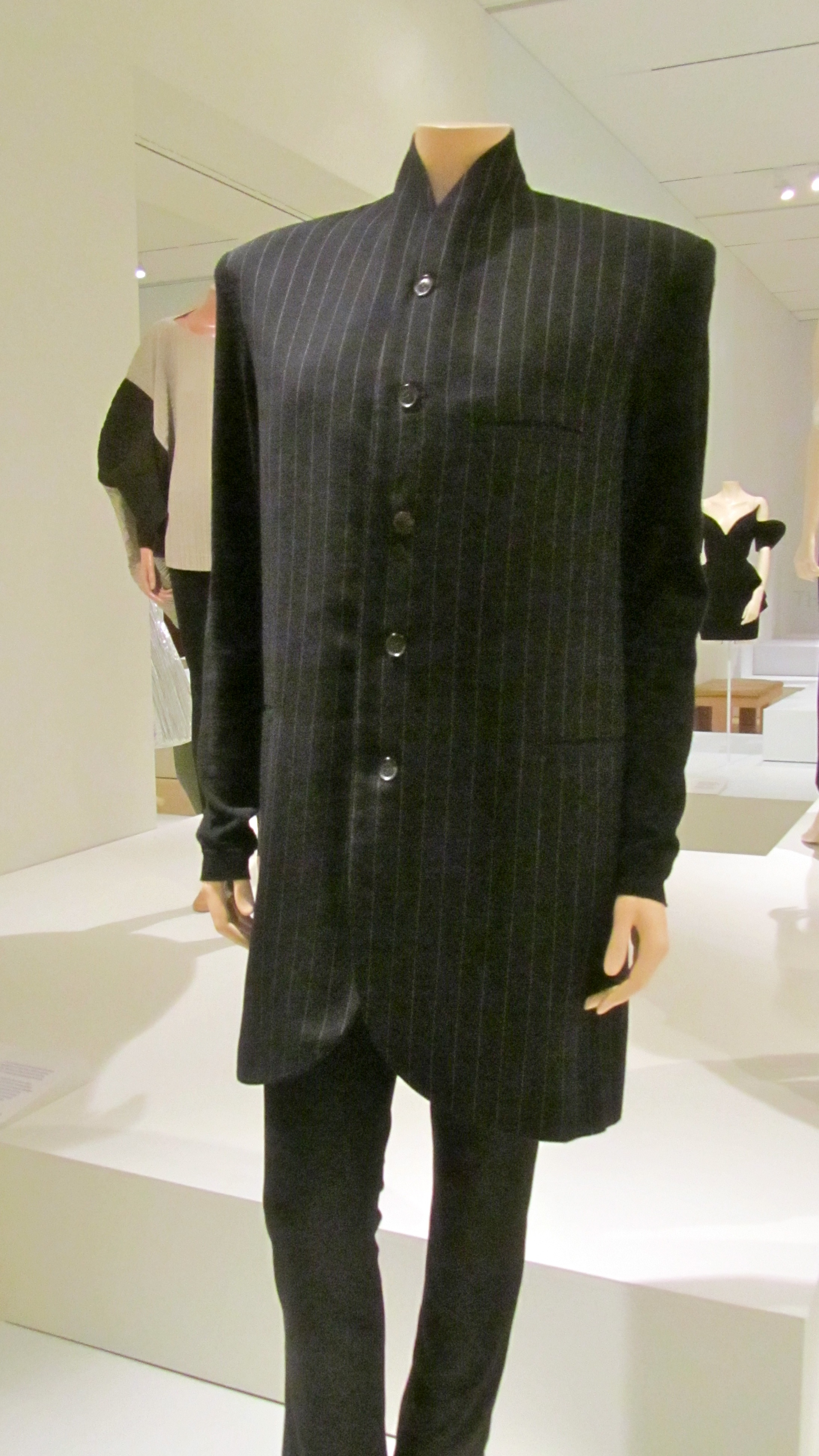
Japanese pinstripe Nehru suit, 1990s.

The Nehru jacket is a hip-length tailored coat for men or women, with a mandarin collar, and with its front modelled on the longer Indian achkan or sherwani frequently worn by Jawaharlal Nehru, the prime minister of India from 1947 to 1964.

== History ==
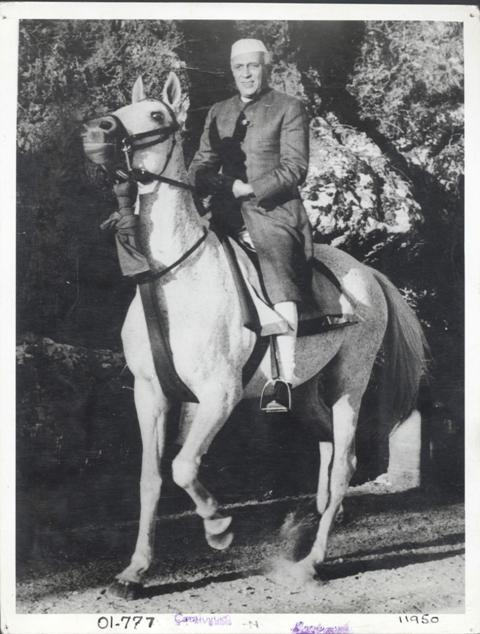
Jawaharlal Nehru in an achkan or sherwani, a garment which served as a model for the Nehru jacket.

The Nehru jacket is a variation of the Jodhpuri where the material is often khadi (hand-woven cloth). The Jodhpuri itself is an evolution from the Angarkha. Popularized during the terms of Jawaharlal Nehru, these distinct Bandhgalas made from khadi remain popular to this day.

== Style ==
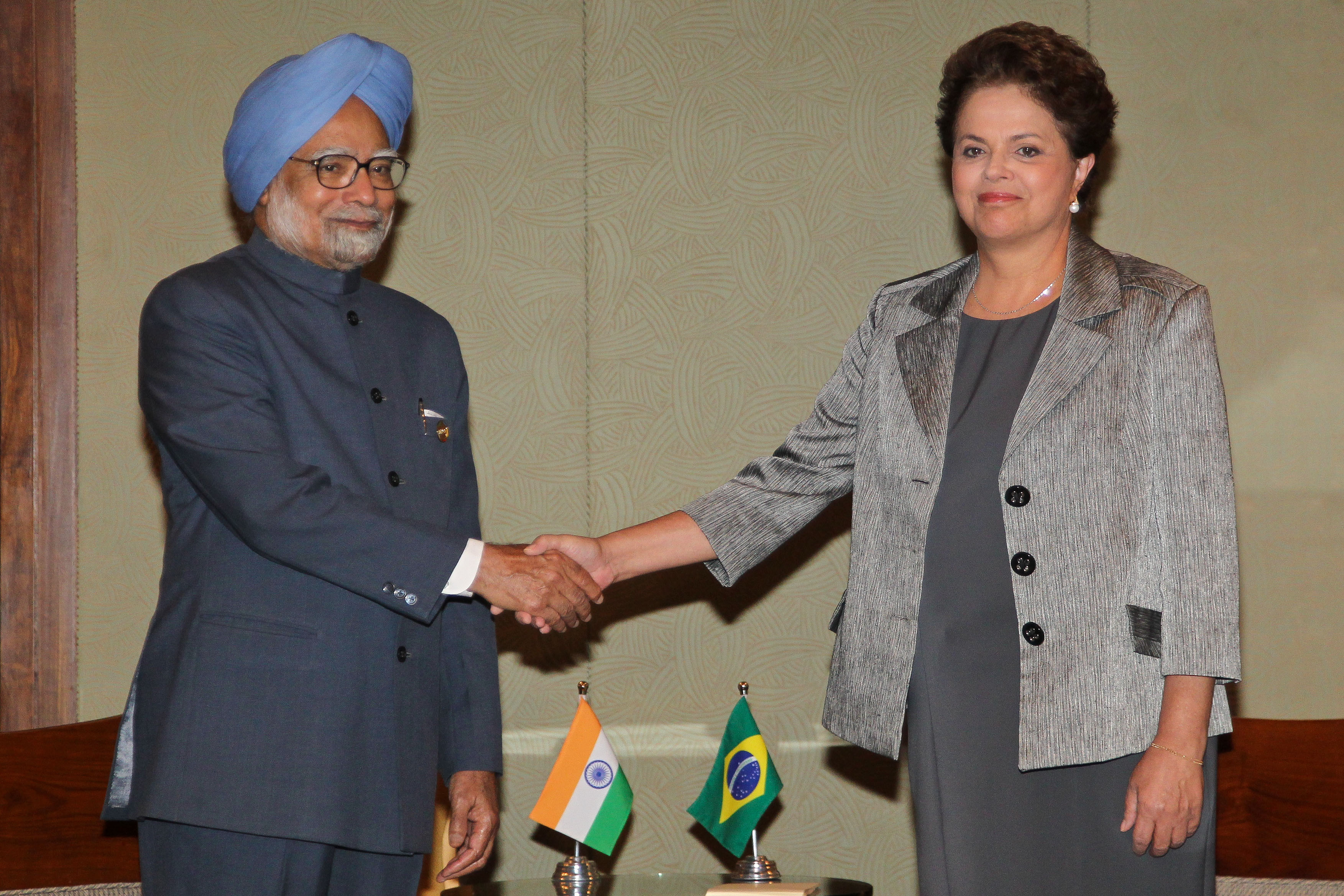
Indian prime minister Manmohan Singh (left) wearing a Nehru jacket as the top half of a suit, meeting Brazilian president Dilma Rousseff in Sanya, China, April 2011

Unlike the achkan, which falls somewhere below the knees of the wearer, the Nehru jacket is shorter. Jawaharlal Nehru, notably, never wore this type of Nehru jacket. (Note: "Nehru Jacket, which we know today had undergone alterations from its basic Achkin or Sherwani model over the years even during the lifetime of Nehru. The main difference between the popular Nehru Jacket and the original Achkan is the length. Achkans go below the knees whereas Nehru Jacket hardly reaches hips. It was only after 1940s the term 'Nehru Jacket' was started using widely. Till then it was known as 'band gale Ica coat', which means 'closed neck coat.' The strangest part of the story is that Nehru had never worn the popular, modified ones named after him, but always preferred the traditional models more akin to Ackhan or Sherwani.")

== Popularity ==
The jacket was first marketed as the Nehru jacket in Europe and America in the mid-1960s. It was briefly popular there in the late 1960s and early 1970s, its popularity spurred by the aspirational class' growing awareness of foreign cultures, by the minimalism of the Mod lifestyle and, in particular, by Sammy Davis Jr. and the Beatles. Some were also worn by Roger Delgado's version of the renegade Time Lord known as the Master on the British science fiction television show Doctor Who.

Charles Barron and Mahathir Mohamad are among the politicians who frequently wear Nehru suits.

In 2012, the Nehru jacket was listed among the "Top 10 Political Fashion Statements" by Time magazine.

== See also ==
- Abacost
- Gakuran
- Kariba suit
- Leisure suit
- Madiba shirt
- Mao suit
- Mujib coat
- Raj pattern
- Sari
