= Sherwani =

Attire of the Muslim Aristocracy of the Indian Sub-Continent

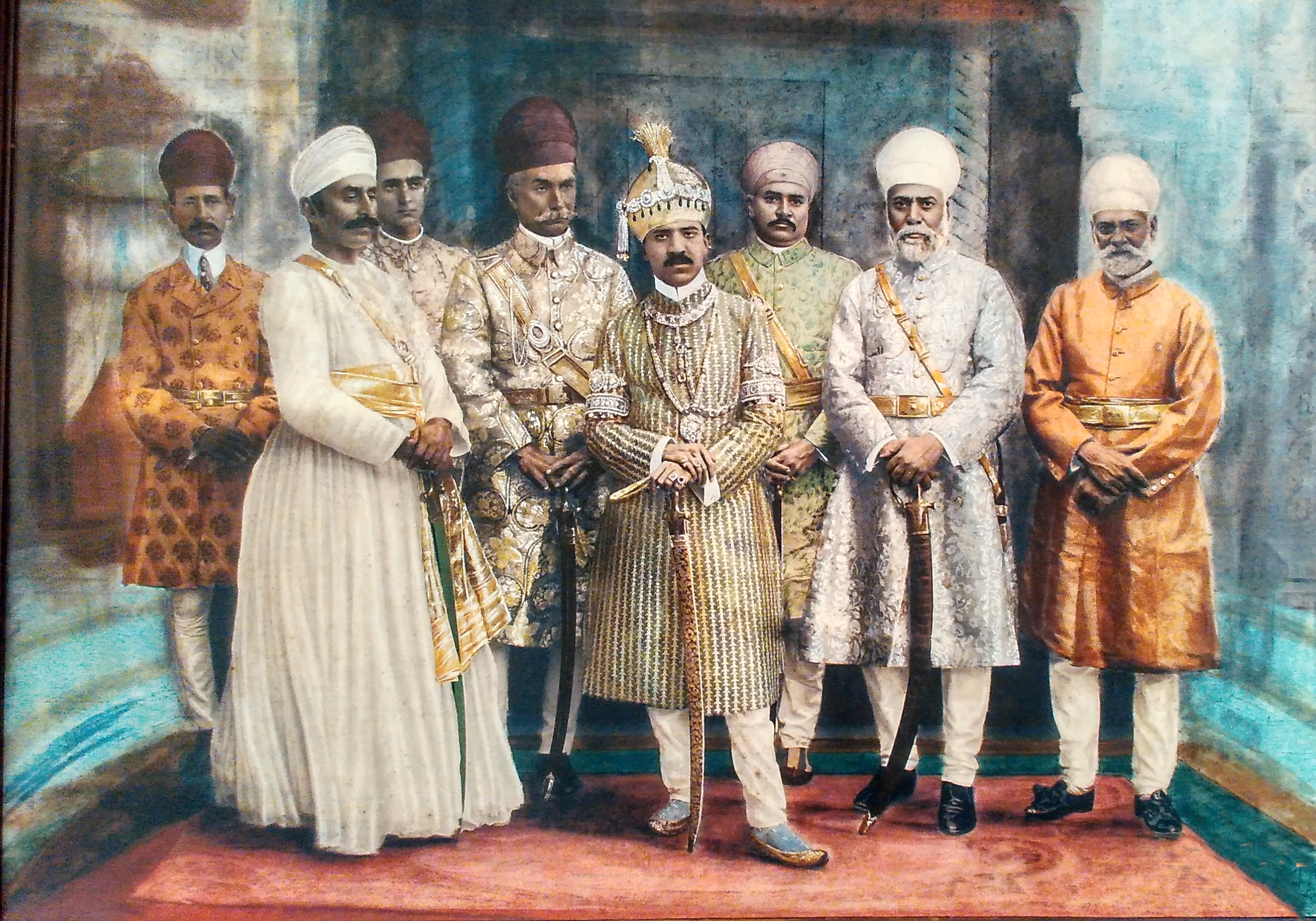
The last Nizam of Hyderabad wearing a sherwani; all the men accompanying him in the picture except the one in a cream coloured garment to his right wear sherwani of differing styles.

A sherwani is a long-sleeved outer coat worn by men in the Indian subcontinent. Like the Western frock coat, it is fitted, with some waist suppression; it falls to below the knees and is buttoned down the front. It can be collarless, have a shirt-style collar, or a stand-up collar in the style of the Mandarin collar. It evolved in the Indian subcontinent in the 19th-century as a result of the outer garment of the late Mughal period, the angarkha—itself evolved from the Persian cape, balaba—being given a western style with a button-down front.

== Etymology ==
The name of the attire is plausibly derived from Shirvan or Sherwan, a region of present-day Azerbaijan, due to the folk dress of that area (Chokha) which resembles the sherwani. Therefore, the garment may also be a Mughalized derivative of the Caucasian dress due to the ethnocultural linkages of Turco-Persian affinity during the Middle Ages.

== History ==
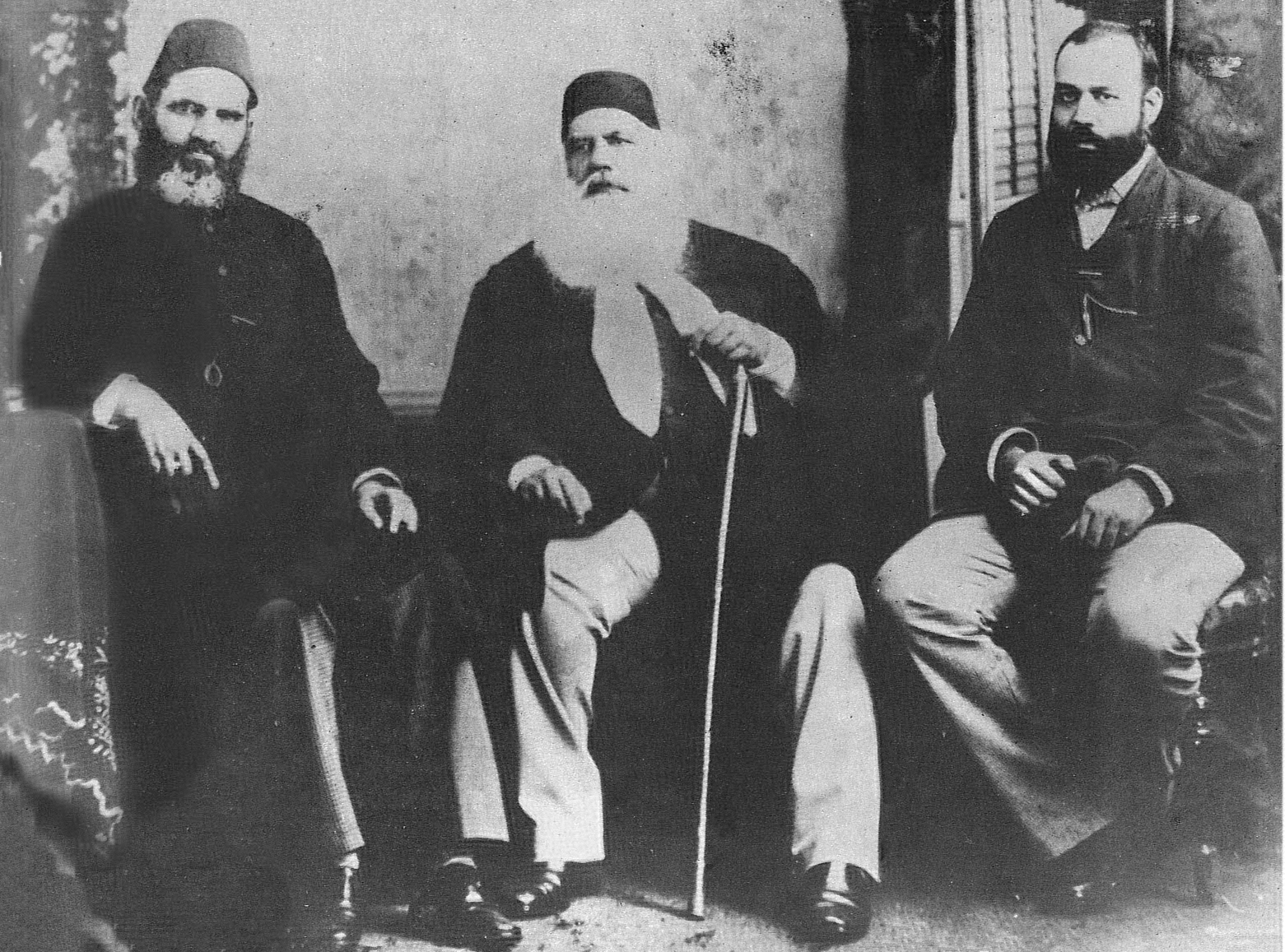
The founders of Aligarh movement wearing sherwani, Nawab Mohsin ul Mulk (left), Sir Syed Ahmed Khan (centre), Justice Syed Mahmood (right).

The sherwani originated in the early 19th century. It was originally associated with Muslim aristocracy during the period of British rule. According to Emma Tarlo, the sherwani evolved from a Persian cape (balaba or chapkan), which was gradually given a more Indian form (angarkha), and finally developed into the sherwani, with buttons down the front, following European fashion. It originated in 19th century British India as the European style court dress of regional Mughal nobles of northern India. It appeared first at Lucknow in the 1820s. It was gradually adopted by the rest of the royalty and aristocracy of the Indian subcontinent, and later by the general population, as a more evolved form of occasional traditional attire.

== Description ==
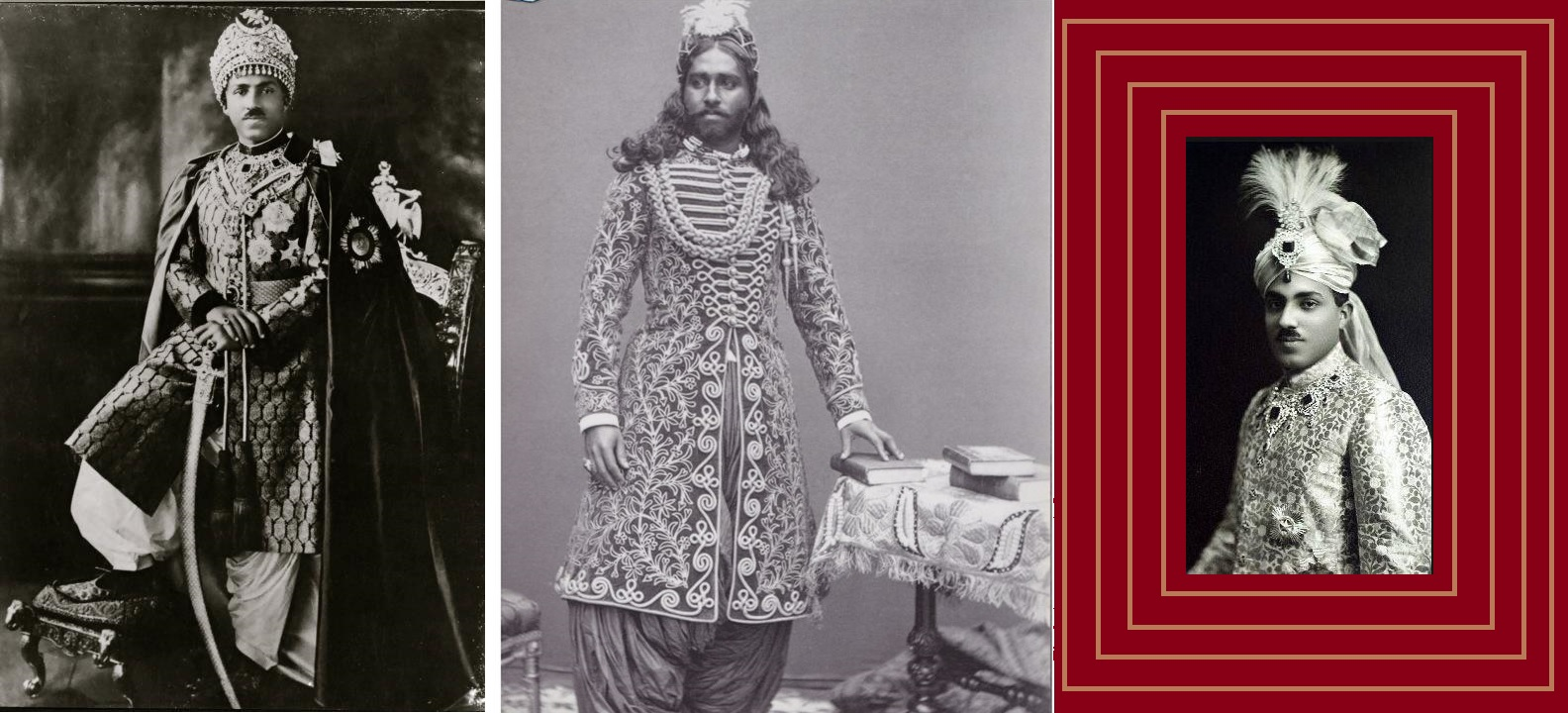
Nawab of Bahawalpur in various styles of sherwani

The sherwani evolved from a Persian cape (balaba or chapkan) and was developed into the sherwani, with buttons down the front, following European fashion.

== Use ==
The sherwani is now famous as a wedding outfit, and it has always been popular as an outfit which can be worn on formal occasions. The sherwani signified the dignity and etiquette of the nobility, and it used to be the court dress of the nobles of Turkish and Persian origin. It is the national dress of Pakistan for men. A sherwani carries a regal feel.

== India ==
In India, the achkan has been generally worn, which is much shorter than the sherwani. The achkan was worn on formal occasions in winter, especially by those from Rajasthan, Punjab, Delhi, Jammu, Uttar Pradesh and Hyderabad. The achkan was adopted from Muslim nobles by upper-class Hindus. The achkan is generally associated with the Hindus while the sherwani was historically and is still favored by Muslims. The two garments have significant similarities, though sherwanis typically are more flared at the hips. The achkan later evolved into the Nehru Jacket, which is now popular in India. In India, the achkan or sherwani is generally worn in combination with the churidar as the lower garment.

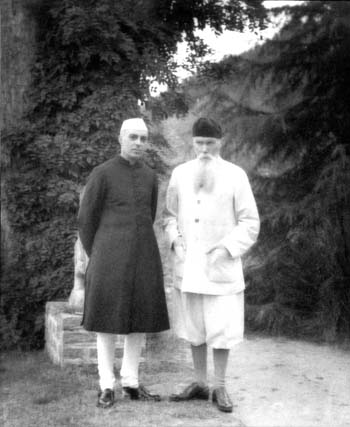
Jawaharlal Nehru (left) wearing an achkan with churidar.

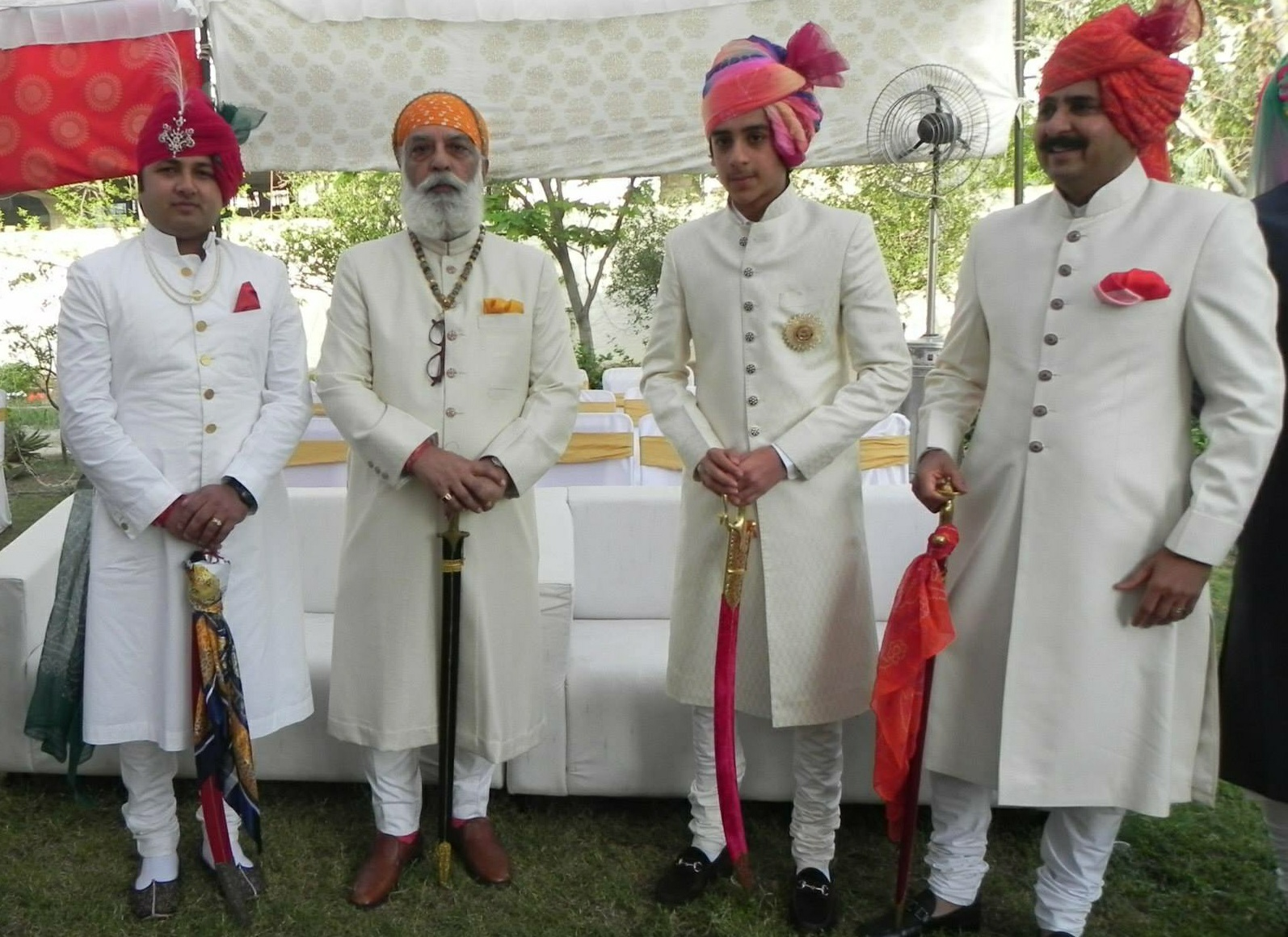
Achkan sherwani and churidar (lower body) worn by Arvind Singh Mewar and his kin during a Hindu wedding in Rajasthan, India.

== Bangladesh ==
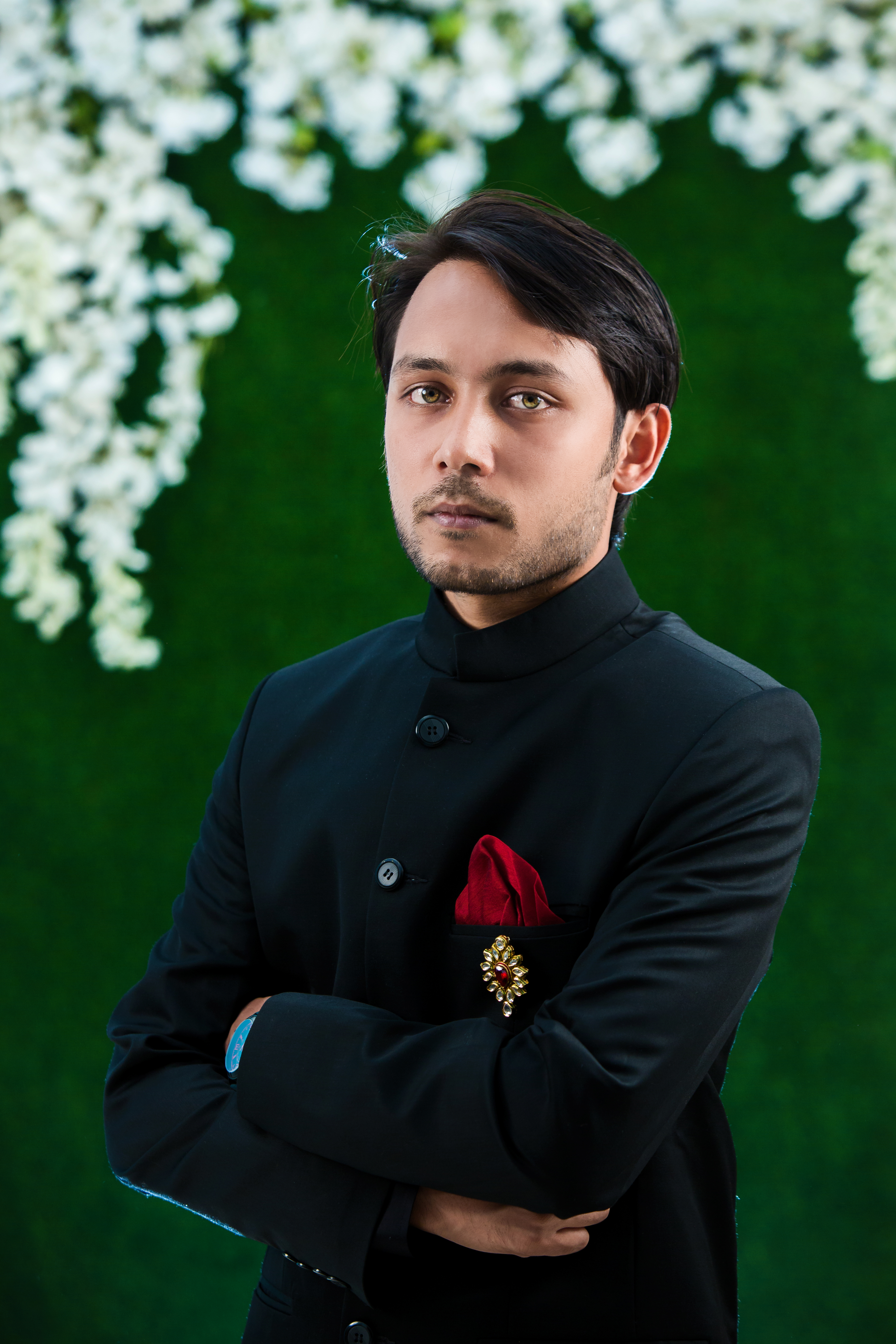
A Bangladeshi groom in traditional sherwani

In Bangladesh, the sherwani is worn by people on formal occasions such as weddings and Eid.

== Pakistan ==
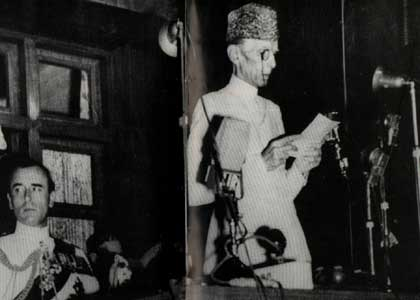
Jinnah (right) addressing the Constituent Assembly on 14 August 1947, wearing a sherwani.

After the independence of Pakistan, Muhammad Ali Jinnah frequently wore the sherwani. Following him, most people and government officials in Pakistan such as the President and Prime Minister started to wear the formal black sherwani over the shalwar kameez on state occasions and national holidays.

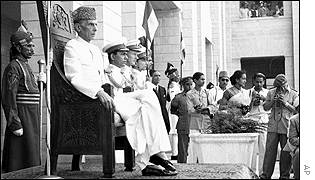
Muhammad Ali Jinnah, founder of Pakistan, is sitting on the Chair of Governor General, sometimes referred as Pakistan's Throne, wearing Sherwani.

== Sri Lanka ==
In Sri Lanka, Sherwani was generally worn as the formal uniform of Mudaliyars and early Tamil legislators during the British colonial period.

== Modern sherwanis ==
Sherwanis are mostly worn in Pakistan, India and Bangladesh. These garments usually feature detailed embroidery or patterns. One major difference between sherwani-wearing habits is the choice of lower garment: while in India it is mainly worn with churidars or pyjamas, in Pakistan and Bangladesh it is mainly worn with a shalwar.

Pakistani journalist, filmmaker and activist, Sharmeen Obaid-Chinoy appeared in sherwani when she won the Academy Award for Best Documentary Short Film in 2012 and 2015.

== See also ==
- Achkan
- Angarkha
- Chokha
- Coat
- Frock coat
- Jama (coat)
- Jodhpuri
