= Sadri (clothing) =

Vest-jacket worn by men in South Asia

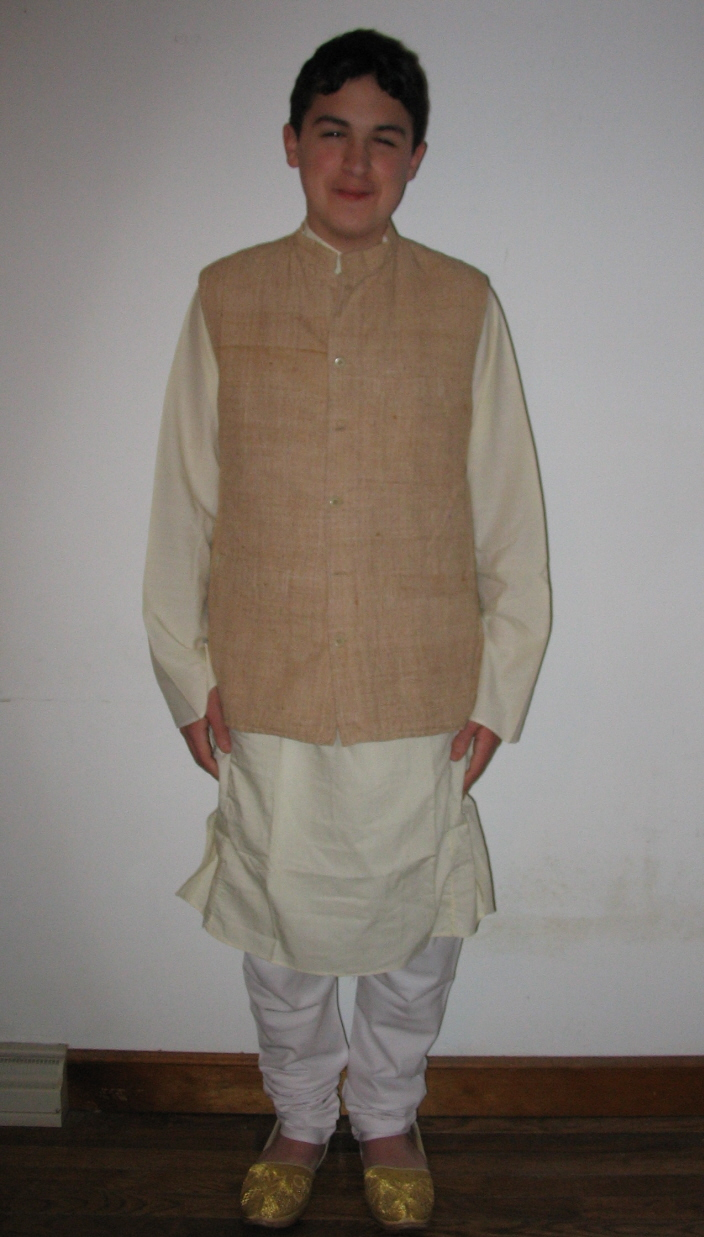
The Khadi bandi is worn over a kurta and churidar.

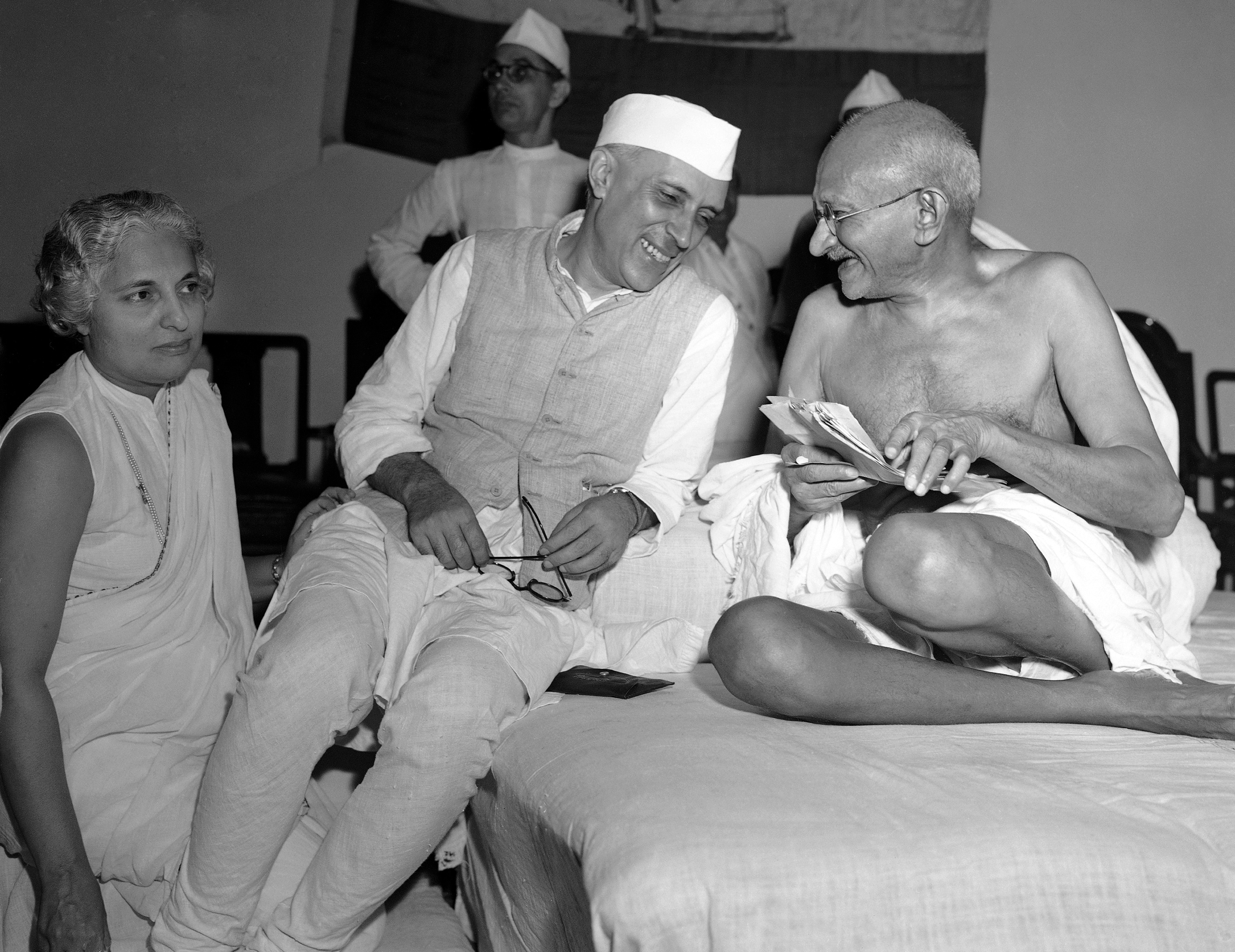
Jawaharlal Nehru, left, in a Bandi or Nehru vest, talking to Mahatma Gandhi, 1942

Sadri (Hindi: सदरी, Urdu: صدری), also known as a Waskat (Hindi: वास्कट, Urdu: واسکٹ) or Bandi (Hindi: बंडी, Urdu: بنڈی), is a vest-jacket worn by men in South Asia, while women sometimes wear a similar waistcoat known as a Koti (Hindi: कोटी, Urdu: کوٹی, Bengali: কোটি). In Europe and America, the sadri became known as a Nehru vest.

== Use ==
The sadri is a sleeveless-vest jacket, traditionally worn over achkan, angarkha, qameez and kurta by men. It was historically worn by the peasant class and was decorated with various styles of folk embroidery for festive occasions. It is part of everyday wear for men and it is also popular among the political class throughout South Asia. In the winter, the sadri is especially worn as it keeps the wearer warm.

Koti jacket was traditionally worn by women, it differs from bandi and sadri worn by men in size and decoration. Gota embroidery is commonly used and was traditionally worn over choli, gagra choli, angarkha and shalwar kameez.

== See also ==
- Afghan clothing
- Indian clothing
- Pakistani clothing
- Textile arts of Bangladesh
- Textile industry of Bangladesh
- Mirzai (garment)
