= Achkan =

Indian men's knee length jacket

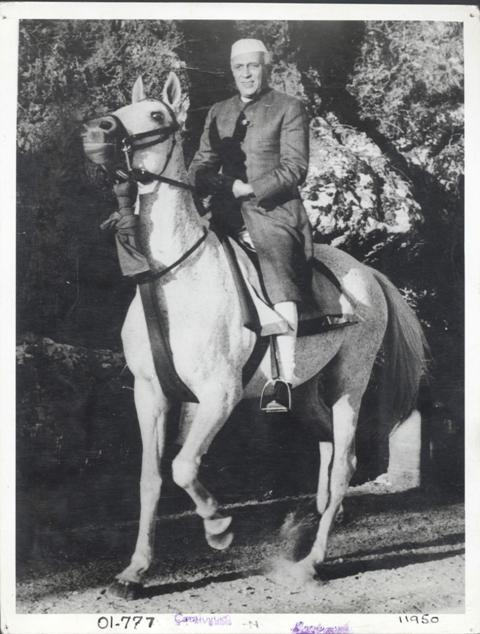
Jawaharlal Nehru wearing achkan.

An achkan (Hindi: अचकन, Urdu: اچکن), also known as baghal bandi, is a knee length jacket worn by men in the Indian subcontinent. It is a similar garment to the angarkha.

== History ==
The achkan evolved from the chapkan, a dress which was worn by people in higher social classes. According to Shrar, the achkan was invented in Lucknow when India was being ruled by independent rulers (rajas, nawabs and Nizams). It was later adopted by high class Hindus from Muslim nobles

It can be distinguished from the sherwani through various aspects, particularly the front opening. Achkans traditionally have a side opening tied with strings, known as baghal bandi, although front openings are not uncommon. Sherwanis always have a straight opening at the front, due to their function as an outer garment. The achkan, like the angarkha, was traditionally worn with a sash known as patka, kamarband or dora wrapped around the waist to keep the entire outfit in place. Achkans are always worn with either dhoti or churidar. Achkans are made from various fabrics for both formal and informal occasions. They often have decorative embroidery in traditional styles, such as gota and badla. Today, achkans are commonly worn by a groom during a wedding ceremony or other formal festive occasions in the Indian subcontinent.

There are various regional variations of achkan worn throughout the Indian subcontinent, known by regional names such as daura in Nepal and Northeast India, angi in Southern India and chola or cholu in Indian Himalayas.

In the Indian subcontinent, the achkan is generally worn for formal occasions in winter, especially by those from Jammu, Rajasthan, Delhi, Uttar Pradesh and Hyderabad. The achkan is generally associated with the Hindus while the sherwani was historically favoured by Muslims. The two garments have significant similarities, though sherwanis typically are more flared at the hips and achkans are lengthier than sherwanis. The achkan later evolved into the Nehru Jacket, which is popular in India.

== See also ==
- Jodhpuri
