= Angarkha =

Traditional upper garment in India subcontinent

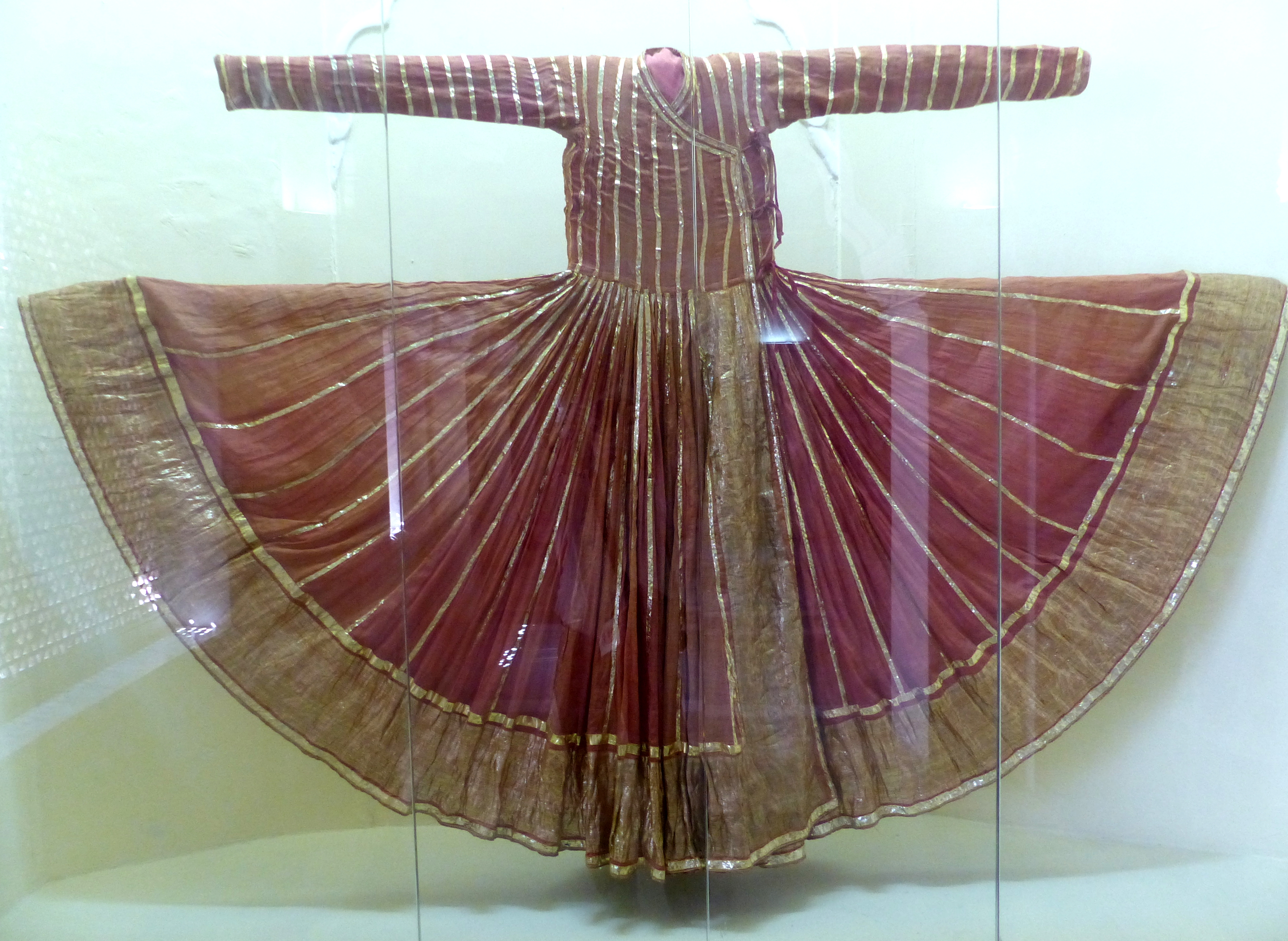
Angarkha from 19th-century Marwar, displayed at Mehrangarh Fort Museum, Jodhpur, Rajasthan, India.

Angarkha is an outer robe with long sleeves which was worn by men in Indian subcontinent. By the 19th-century it had become the generally accepted attire of an educated man in public. It had evolved from the Persian cape balaba or chapkan as a result of being given a more Indian form in the late medieval or early modern era.

== Etymology ==
Angarkha comes from the Sanskrit aṅgarakṣaka, meaning 'body-protector'.

== Gallery ==
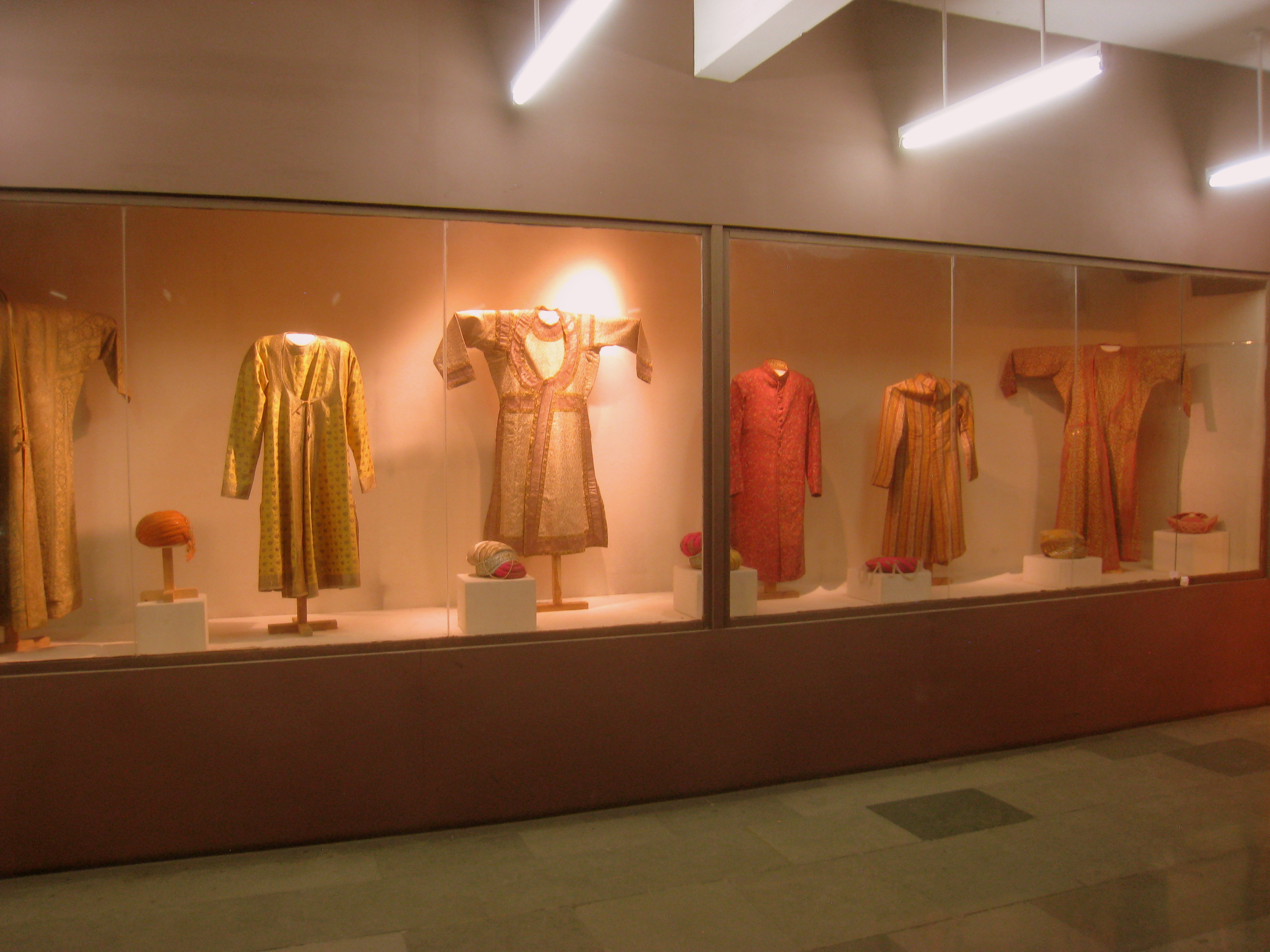
Display of various styles of achkan and Angarkha worn by men, Delhi textile museum.

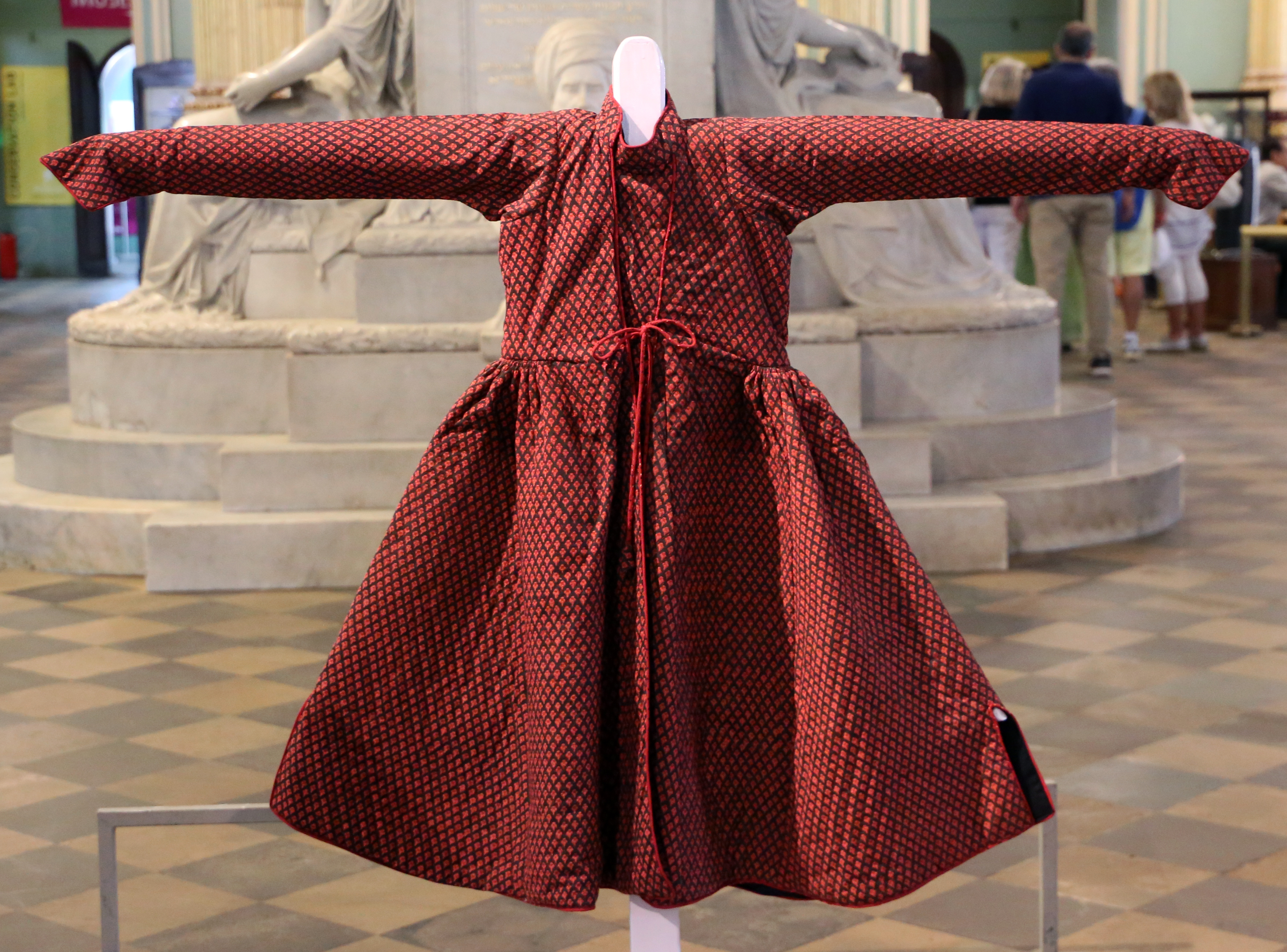
Red, patterned Angarkha

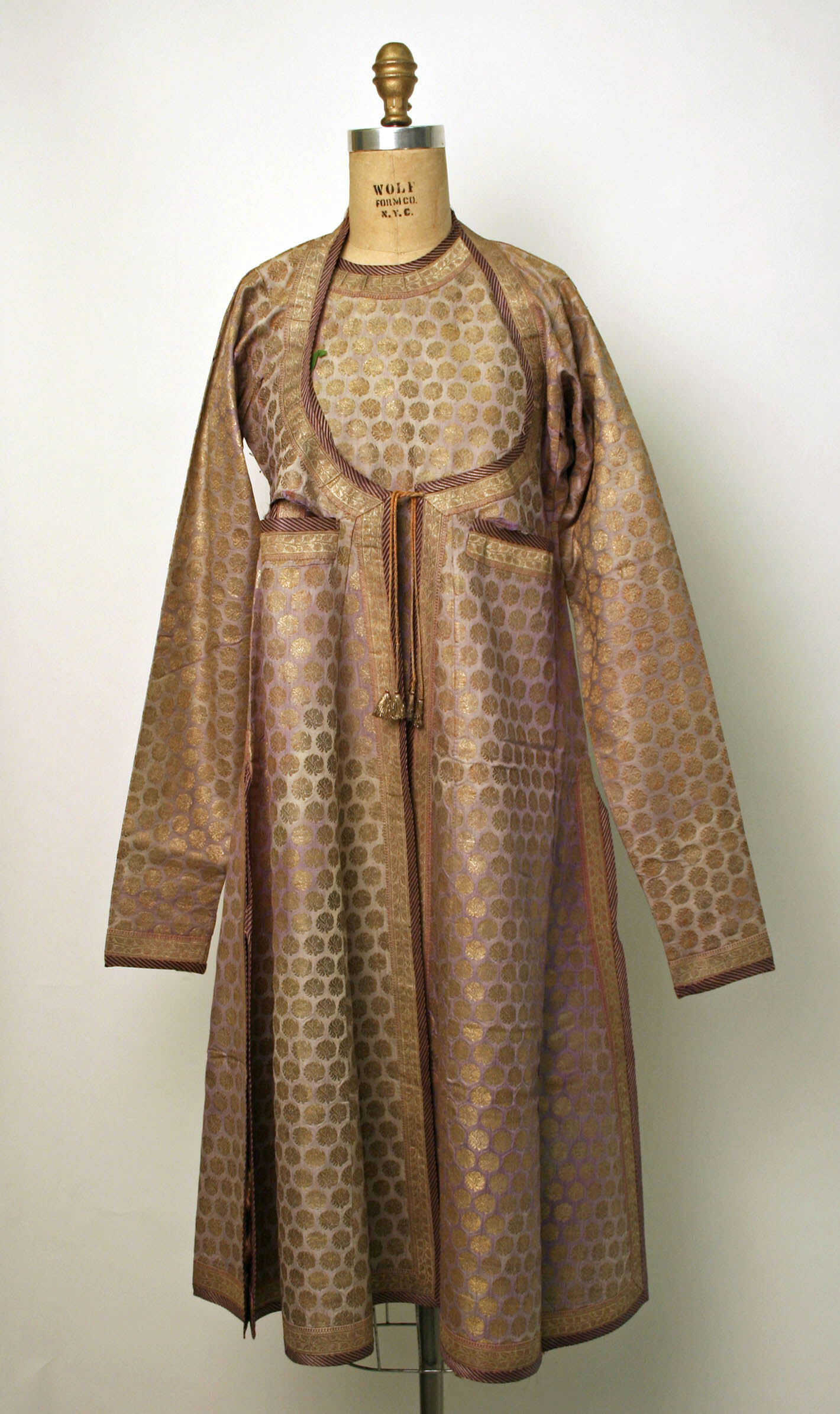

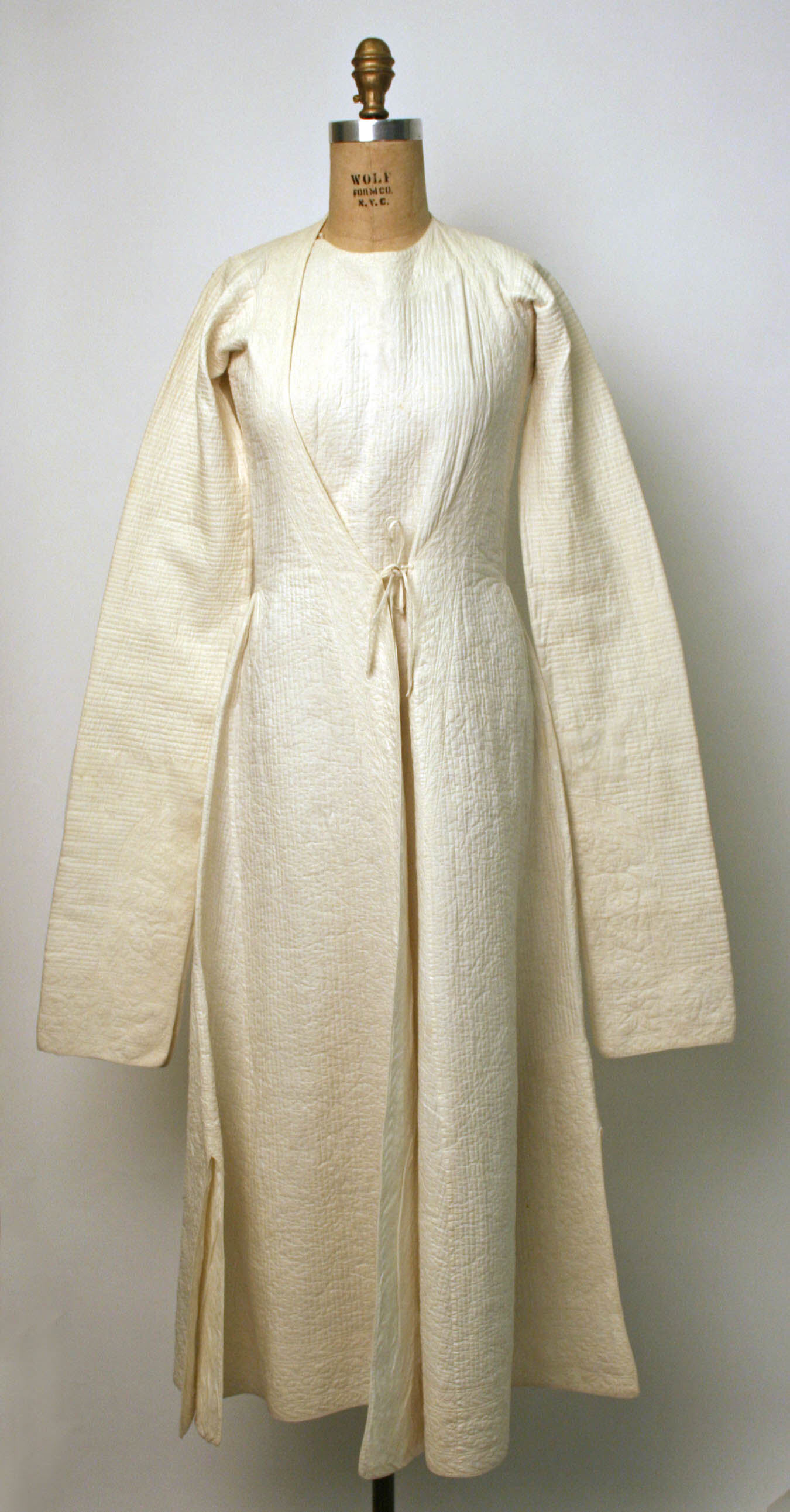
White Angarkha

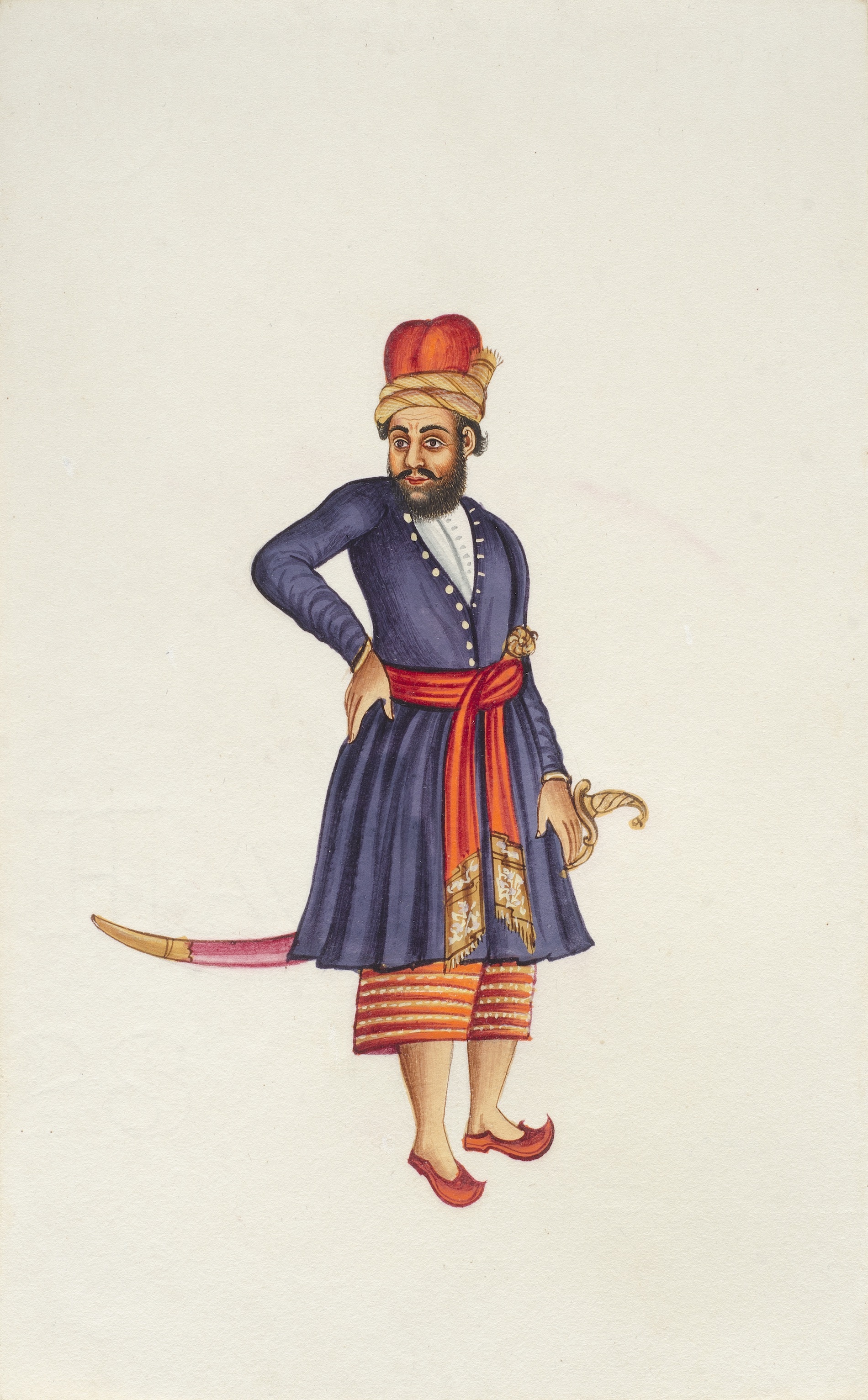
A Mughal nobleman wearing a blue angarkha.

== See also ==
- Achkan
- Dashiki
- Sadri (clothing)
- Sherwani
- Tunic
- Jama (coat)
- Jodhpuri
- Kurta
