= Jodhpuri =

Type of suit popular in India

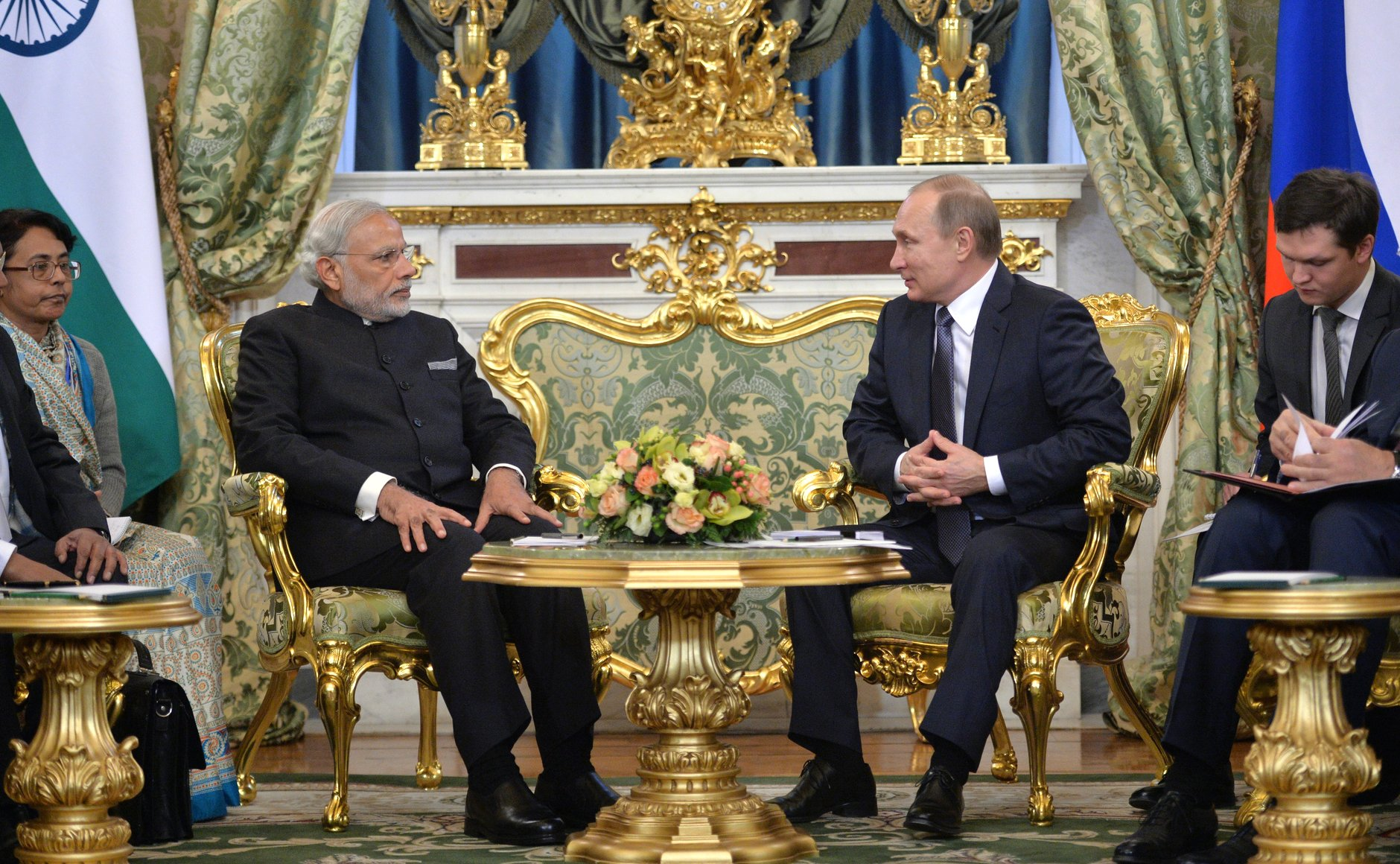
Narendra Modi, Prime Minister of India (left), wearing a Jodhpuri suit, with Vladimir Putin, President of Russia, wearing a lounge suit

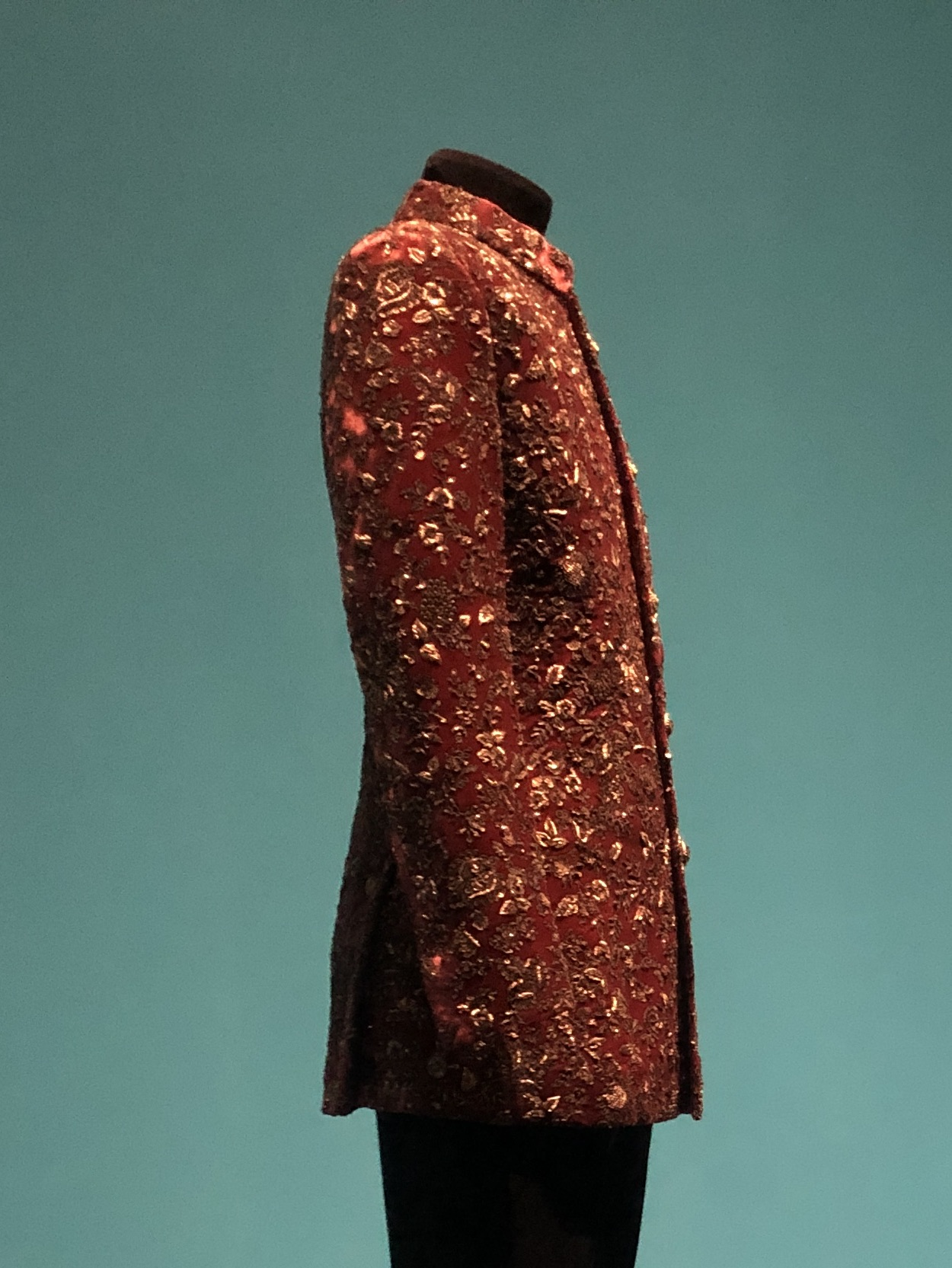
Jodhpuri bandhgala, by Sabyasachi Mukherjee

A Jodhpuri suit or bandhgala (lit. ‘closed neck’), is a formal suit from Rajasthan, India. It originated in the erstwhile princely Jodhpur State in former Rajputana and gained popularity in India during the mid-19th to mid-20th century. It consists of a coat and trousers, sometimes accompanied by a vest. It brings together a shorter cut with hand-embroidery escorted by the waistcoat. The suit combines elements of traditional Indian attire with Western tailoring, emerging in the late 19th and early 20th centuries during the princely rule in Rajasthan. Initially popular among Rajput royalty and aristocracy, especially during the British Raj, the Jodhpuri suit has evolved into a symbol of formal and ceremonial wear in India.

== History ==
The current consensus among experts is that the bandhgala jacket is a distinctly Indian garment whose origins date back to the 16th-century Mughal courts, particularly under Emperor Akbar. The earliest structural ancestor of the bandhgala was the Mughal era jama and angrakha. Under Mughal rule, Marwar’s Rathore rulers blended Mughal court dress with Rajput warrior traditions. Under Raja Udai SIngh, Jodhpur adopted the bago court tunic, later adding structured over-garments like the dagali and gudadi. Originally they were layered and padded jackets, but they gradually transformed the long Mughal coat into a shorter, fitted jacket form that became the basis of the bandhgala. Its defining features include a closed, high collar, structured shoulders and a tailored fit, which evolved in the Rajput courts of Jodhpur. By the 19th century, the Jodhpur royal family refined it into a practical, waist-length jacket suitable for horse riding and polo, worn with tight breeches that became known as 'jodhpurs'. It was nicknamed "prince suit" or "prince cut." The jacket evolved over four centuries, shaped by Mughal court traditions, Rajput warrior style and the tailoring heritage of Marwar. Inspired by Indian portrait photographs of princes and others, and also the glamour of Jodhpur polo teams travelling for matches to London in the 1930s, European tailors refined the jacket’s construction while preserving its high collar, helping shape the modern bandhgala. Although it absorbed some British military tailoring elements during the colonial era, the bandhgala remained fundamentally Indian and was adopted by Indian Railways in the late 19th century, replacing more European-style uniforms. It was reclaimed by Indian nationalists after independence and continued in the Indian railways.

In January 2026, India’s railways minister, Ashwini Vaishnaw, denounced it as a symbol of a “colonial mindset” and announced its immediate removal from the formal uniform of Indian Railways staff. His government is fervently trying to, according to his own words, “find every trace of colonialism and banish them." The move aligns with the BJP led Narendra Modi government’s broader push to eliminate remnants of "colonial mindset."

== See also ==
- Jodhpurs
- Jodhpur boot
- Nehru jacket
