= Door knocker =

Device fixed to a door to make a noise

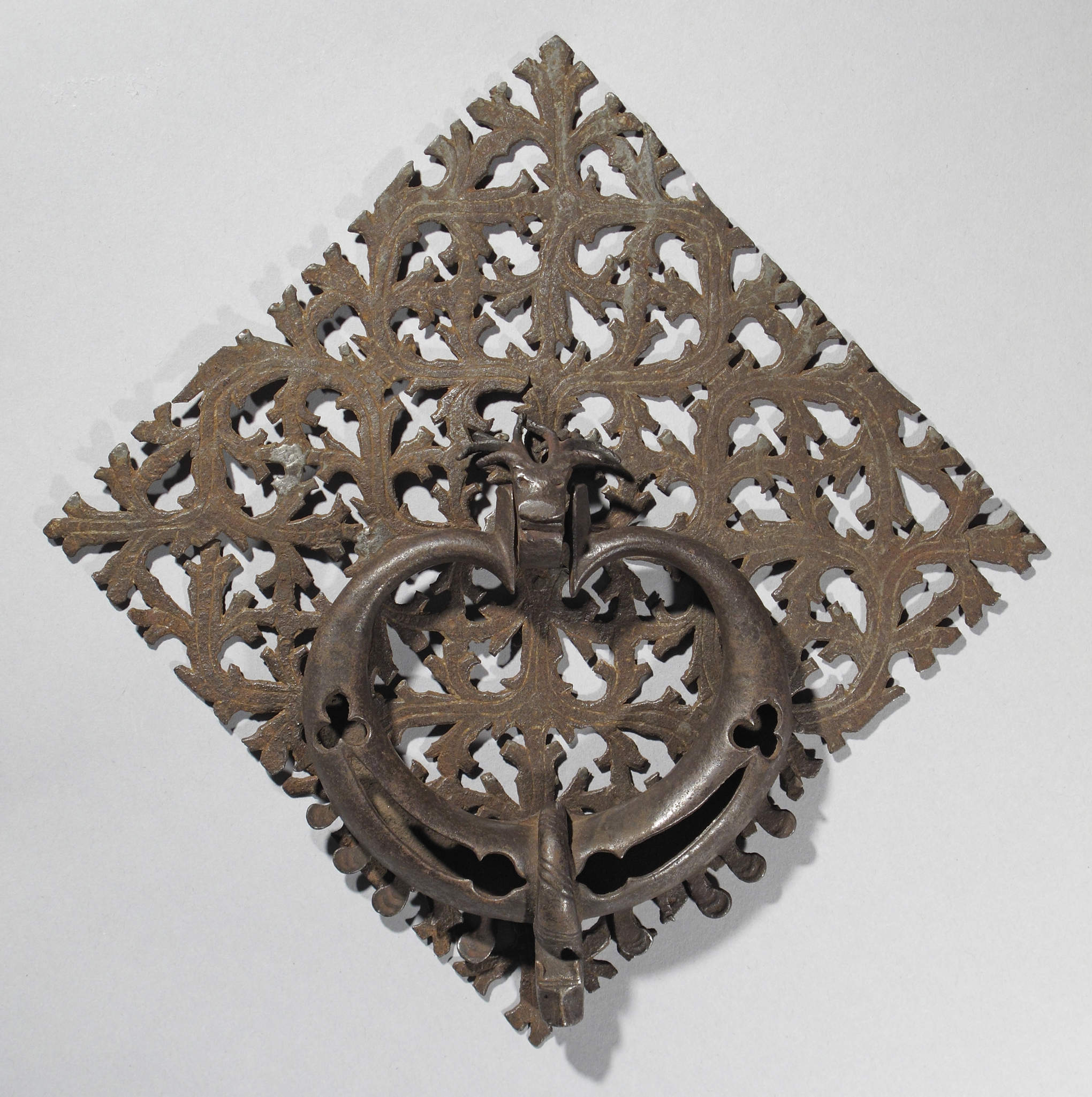
Iron door knocker, from the 15th–16th centuries, in the Metropolitan Museum of Art (New York City)

The sound of a door knocker

A door knocker is an item of door furniture that allows people outside a house or other dwelling or building to alert those inside to their presence. A door knocker has a part fixed to the door, and a part (usually metal) which is attached to the door by a hinge, and may be lifted and used to strike a plate fitted to the door, or the door itself, making a noise. The struck plate, if present, would be supplied and fitted with the knocker. Door knockers are often ornate, but may be no more than a simple fitting with a metal bob, or ring.

== Types ==
German professor Franz Sales Meyer distinguished three kinds of door knocker: the "ring", the "hammer", and an ornate category which could take the shape of an animal or another figure. High demand for antique door knockers in the early 20th century in the United States caused forged versions to emerge.

== Gallery ==
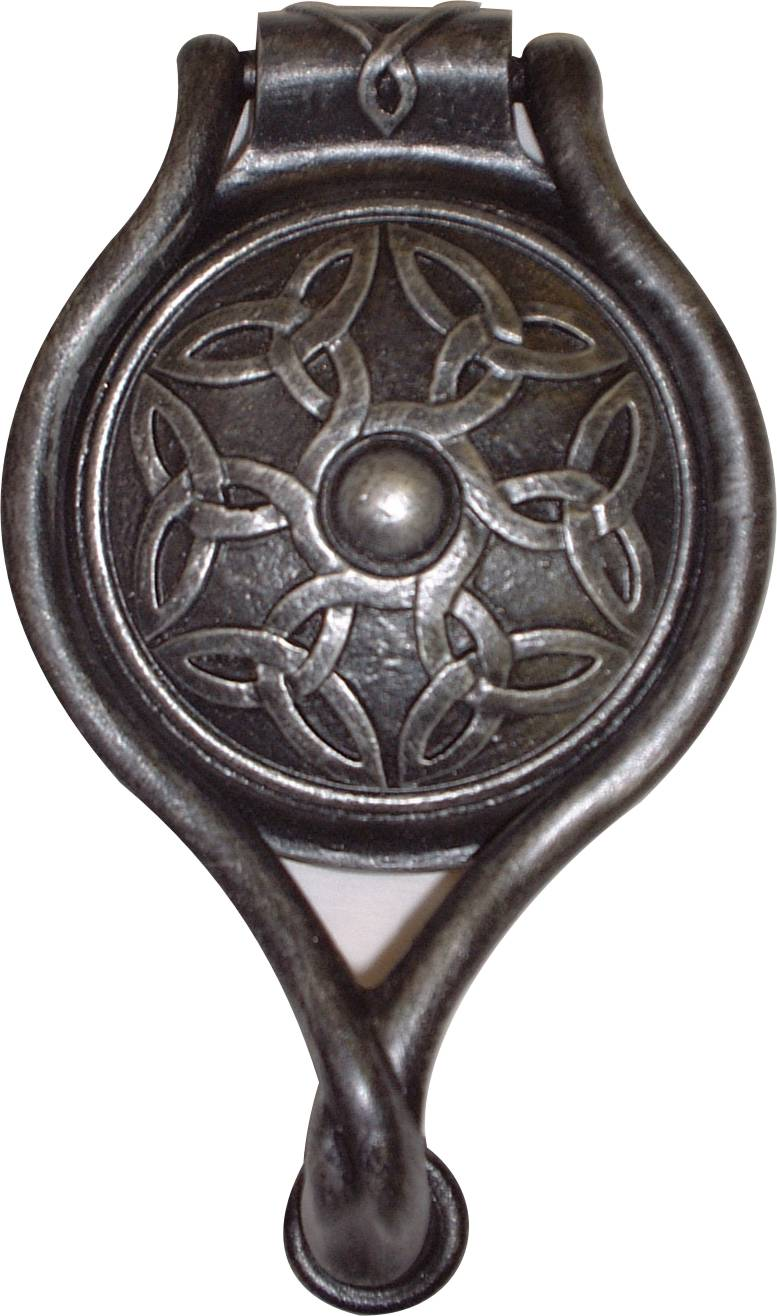
A British cast iron door knocker

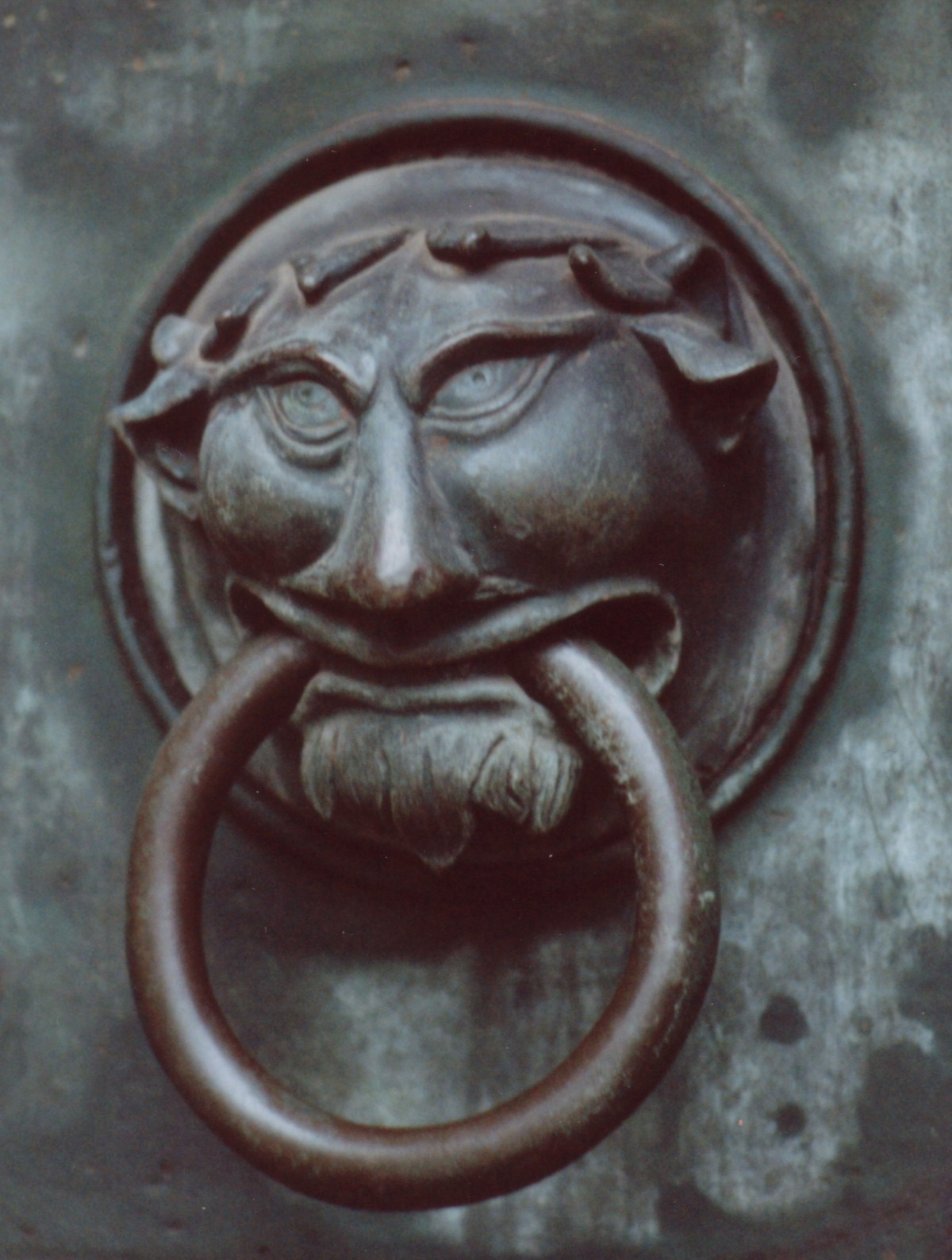
"Ring of Mercy" on the Dom (Cathedral) St. Maria. of Augsburg.

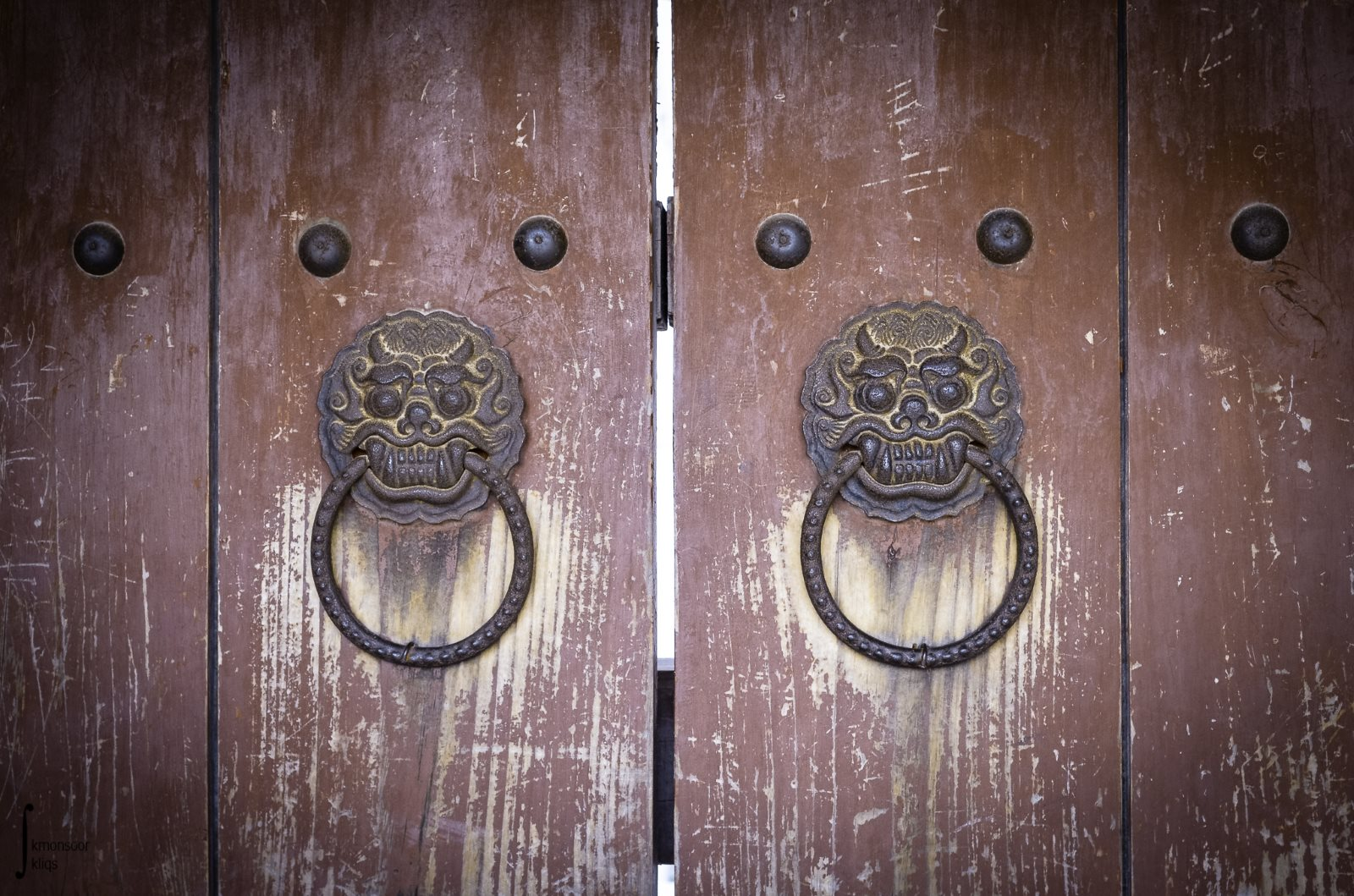
Dragonhead door knockers, Bulguksa Temple, Gyeongju, South Korea

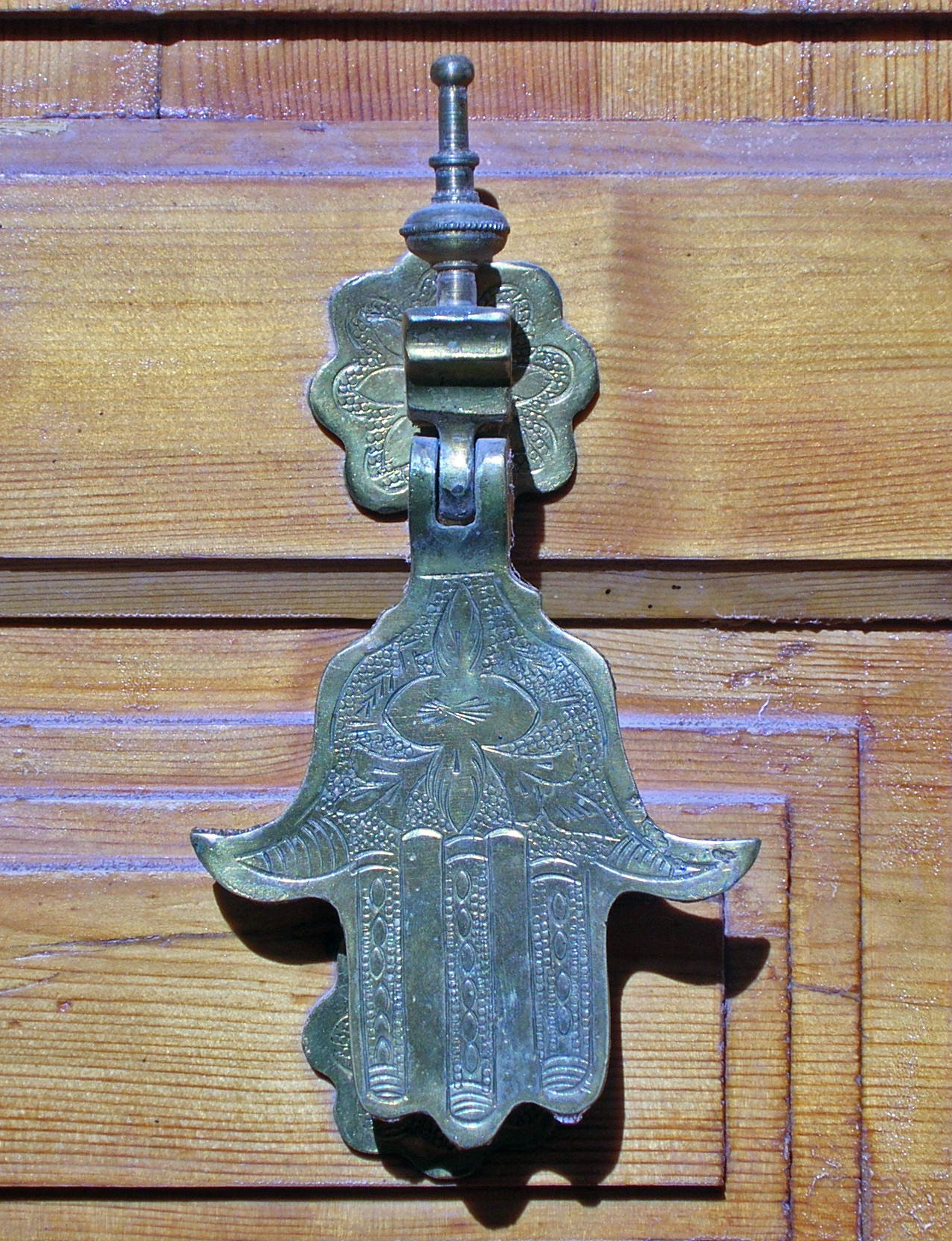
Hamsa door knocker in Morocco

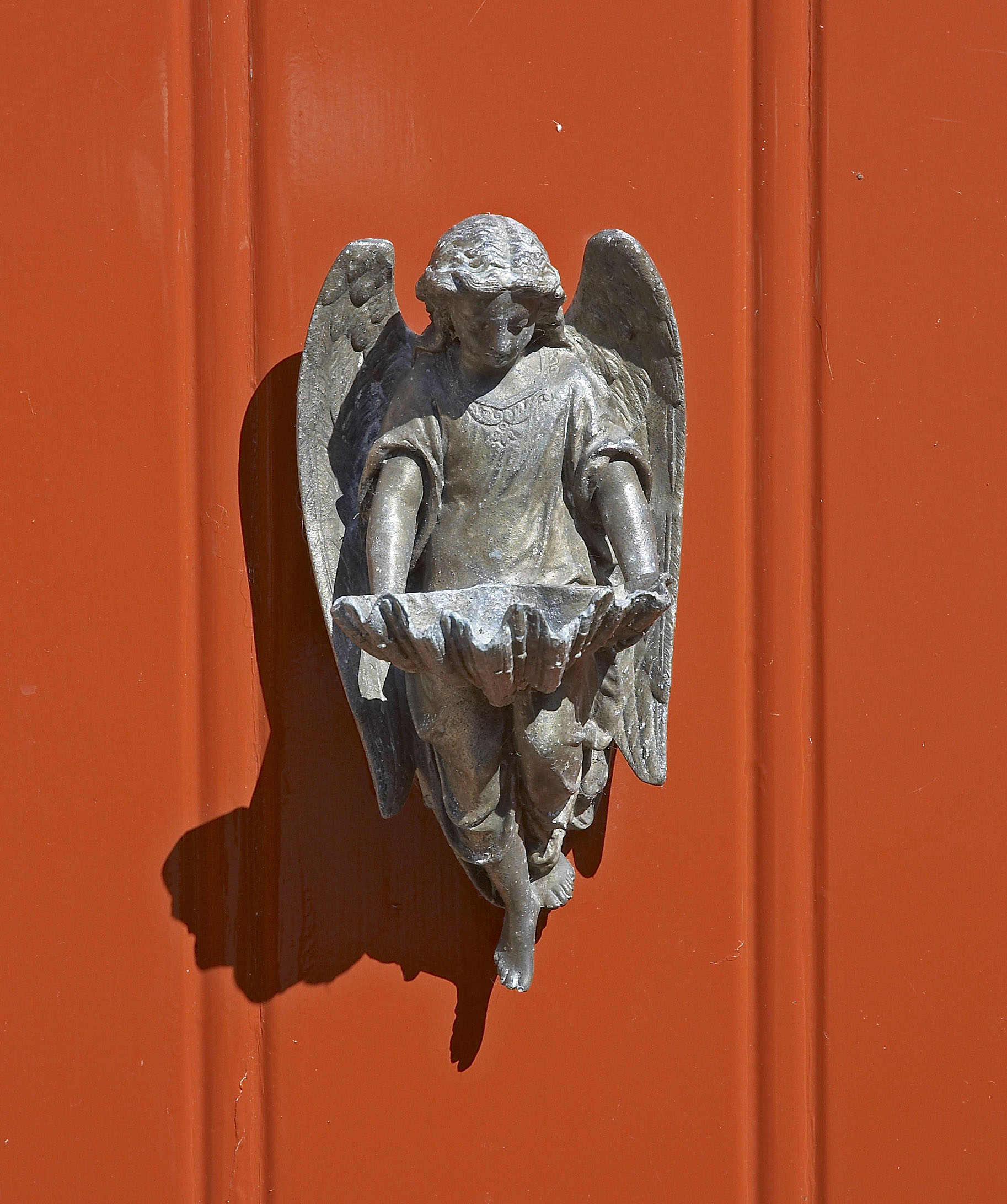
Angel door knocker in Harderwijk, the Netherlands

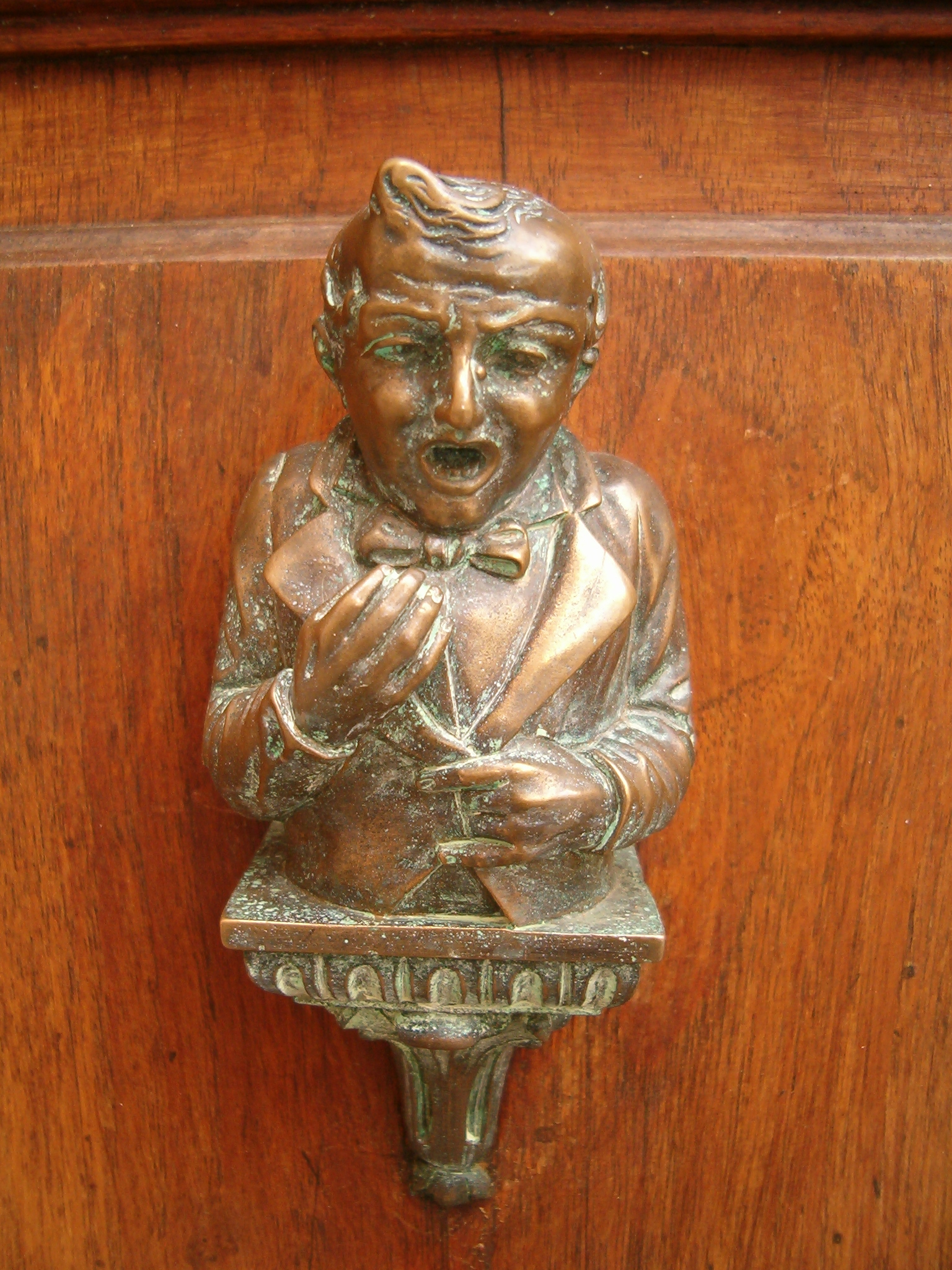
Door knocker in Venice

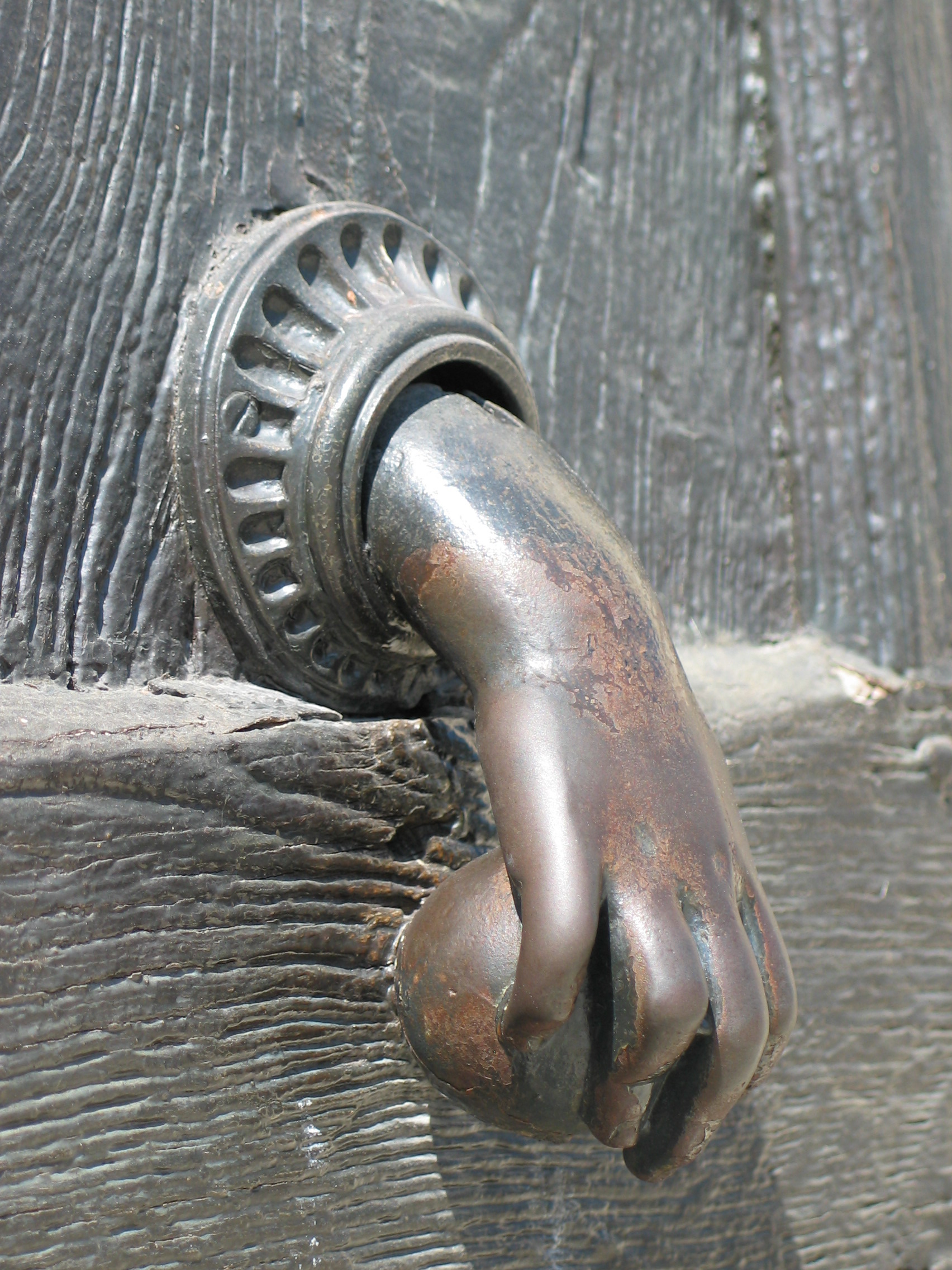
Door knocker in Orléans, France

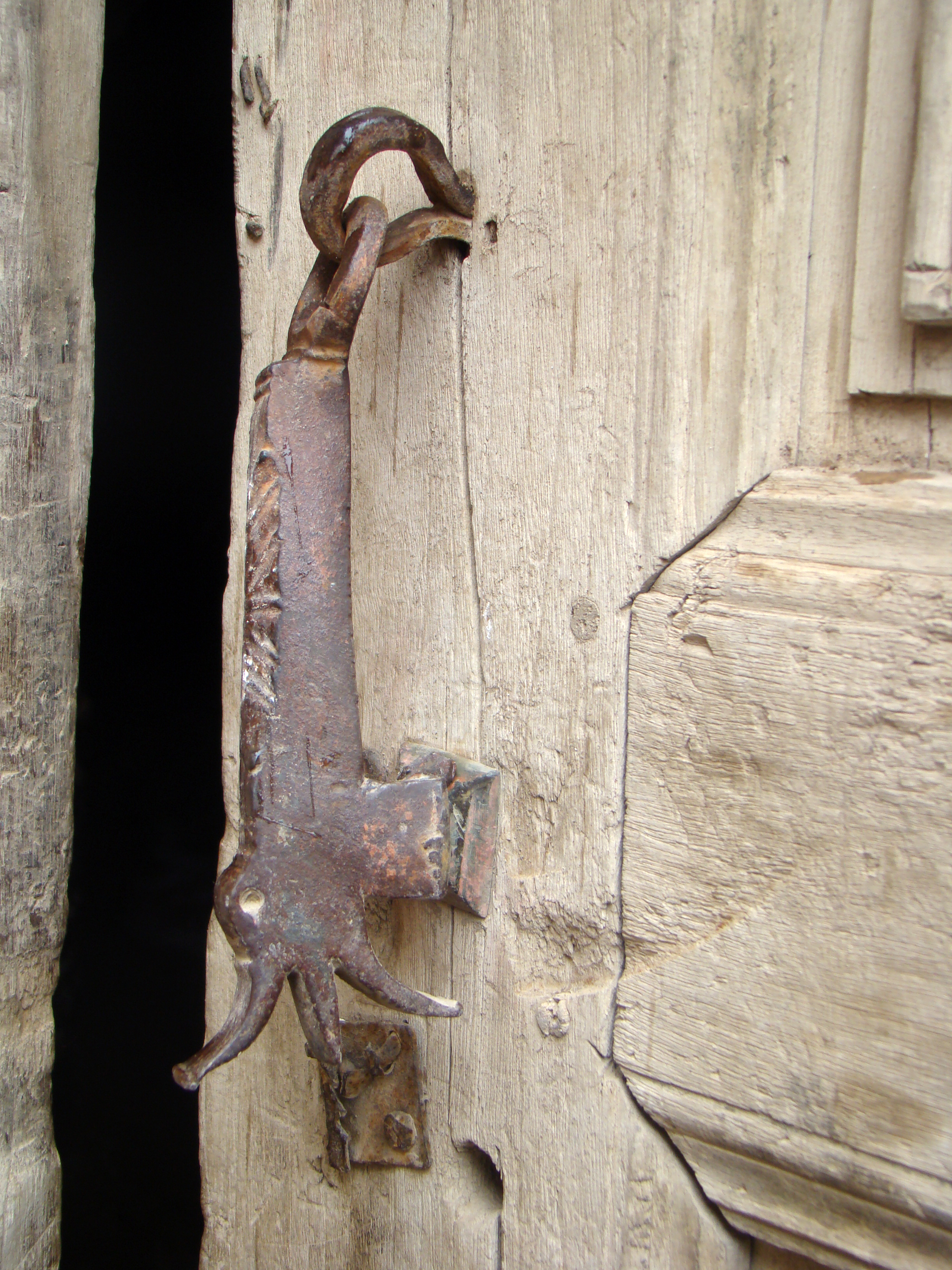
Door knocker in Haji Bulagi House, Iran

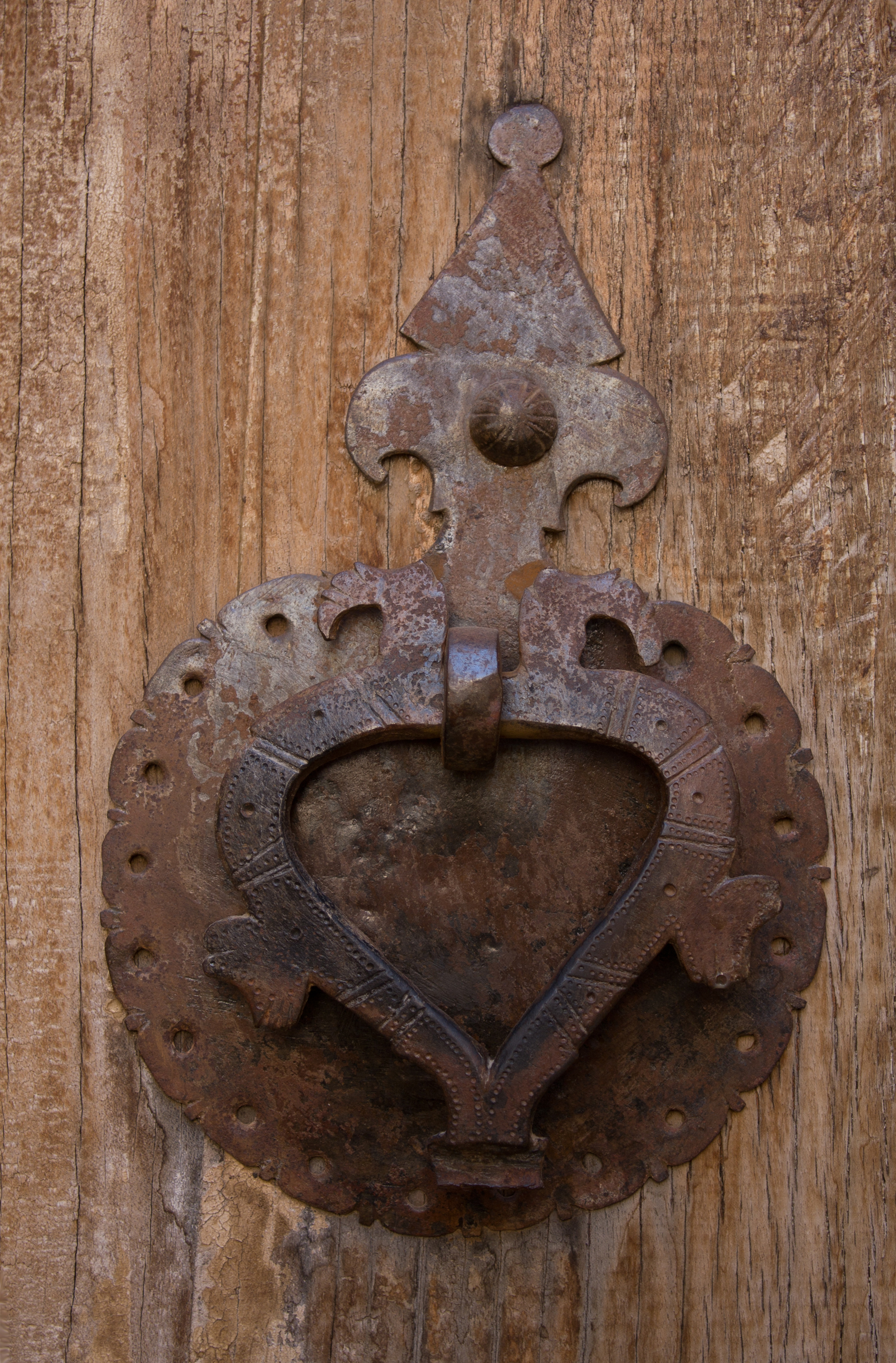
Door knocker in Behnam House, Iran

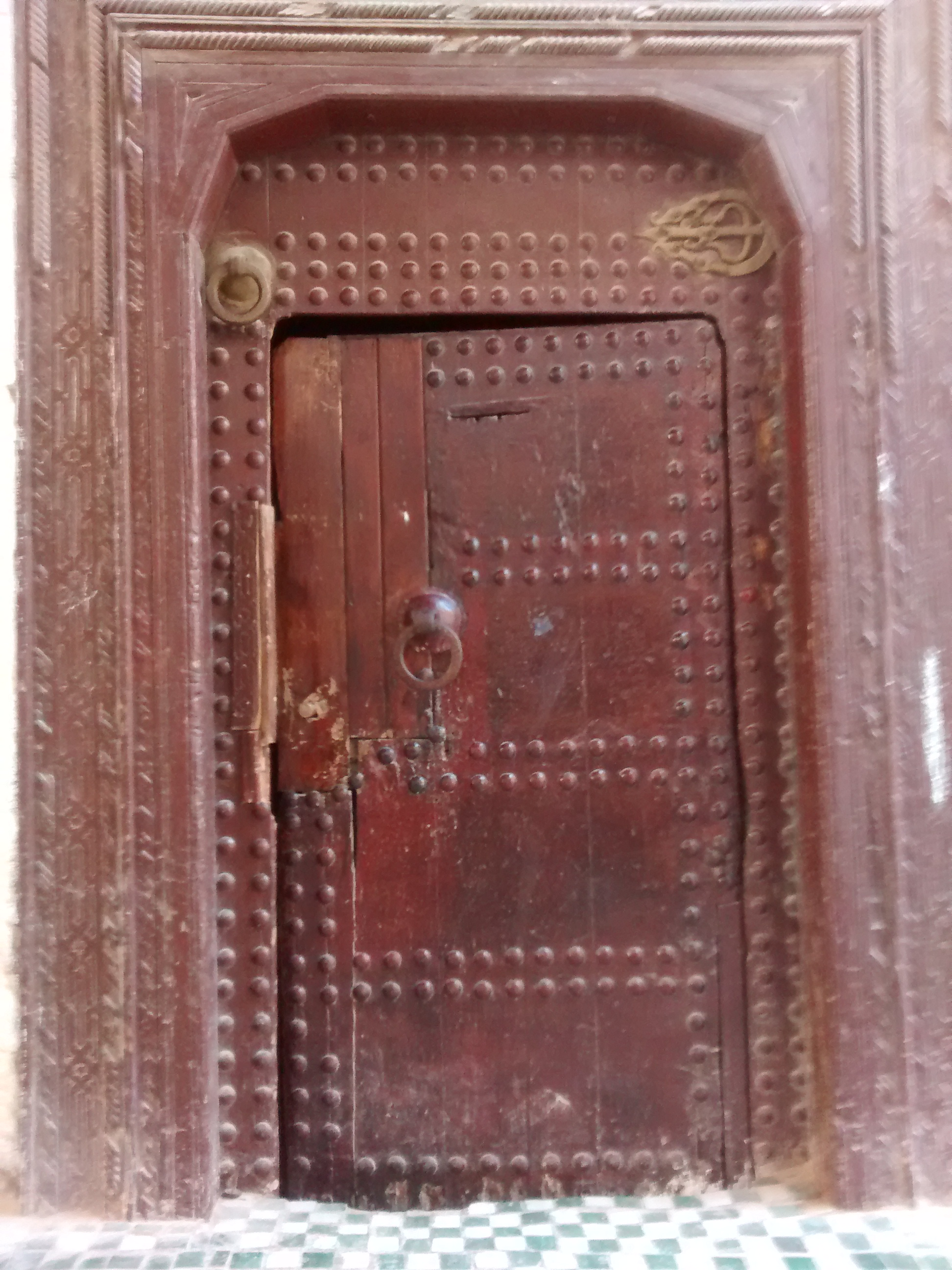
A door in Fez, Morocco with two knockers. Traditionally, one was used by women and the other by men (see top left).

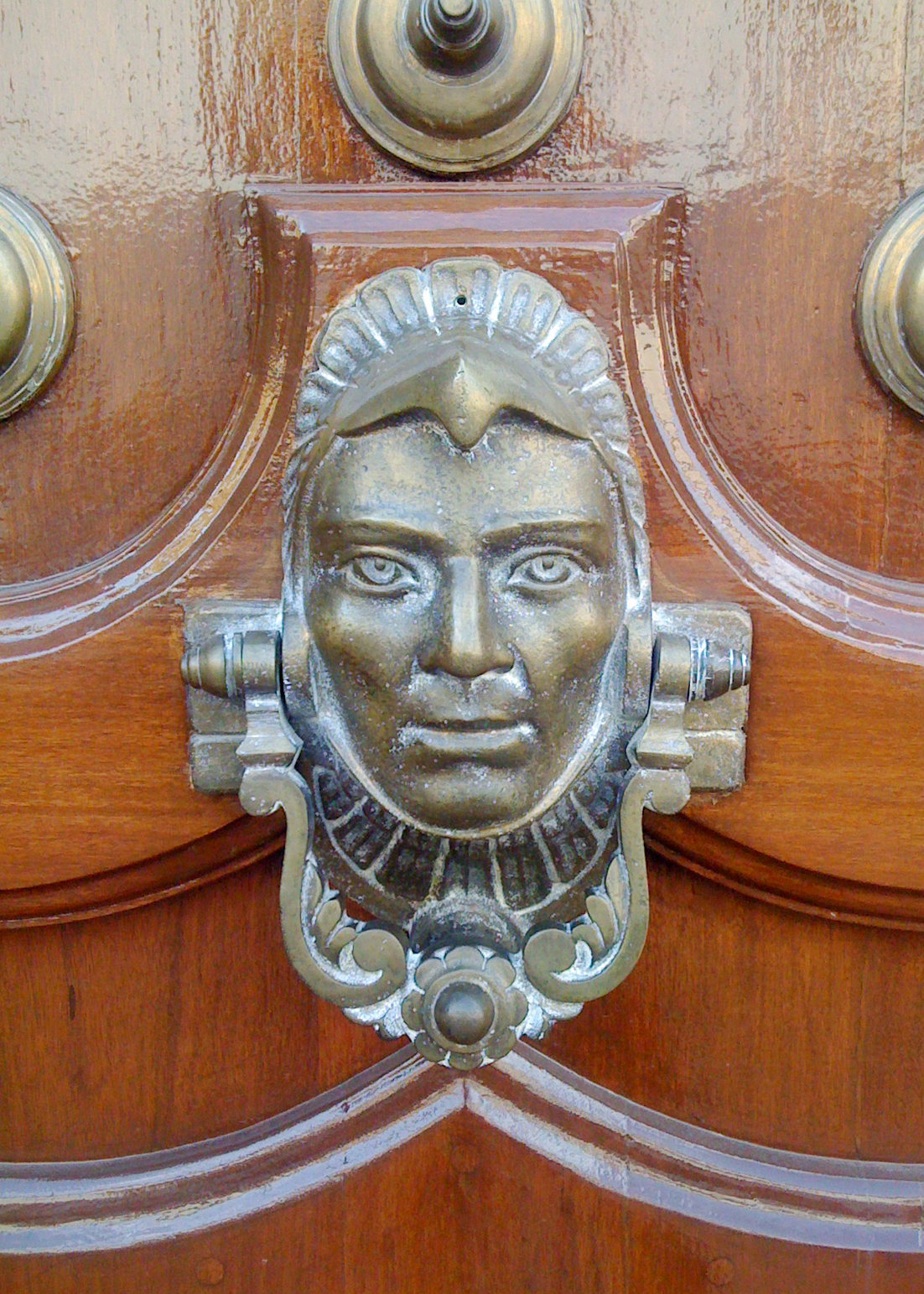
Door knocker depicting an Eagle warrior in Querétaro, Mexico.

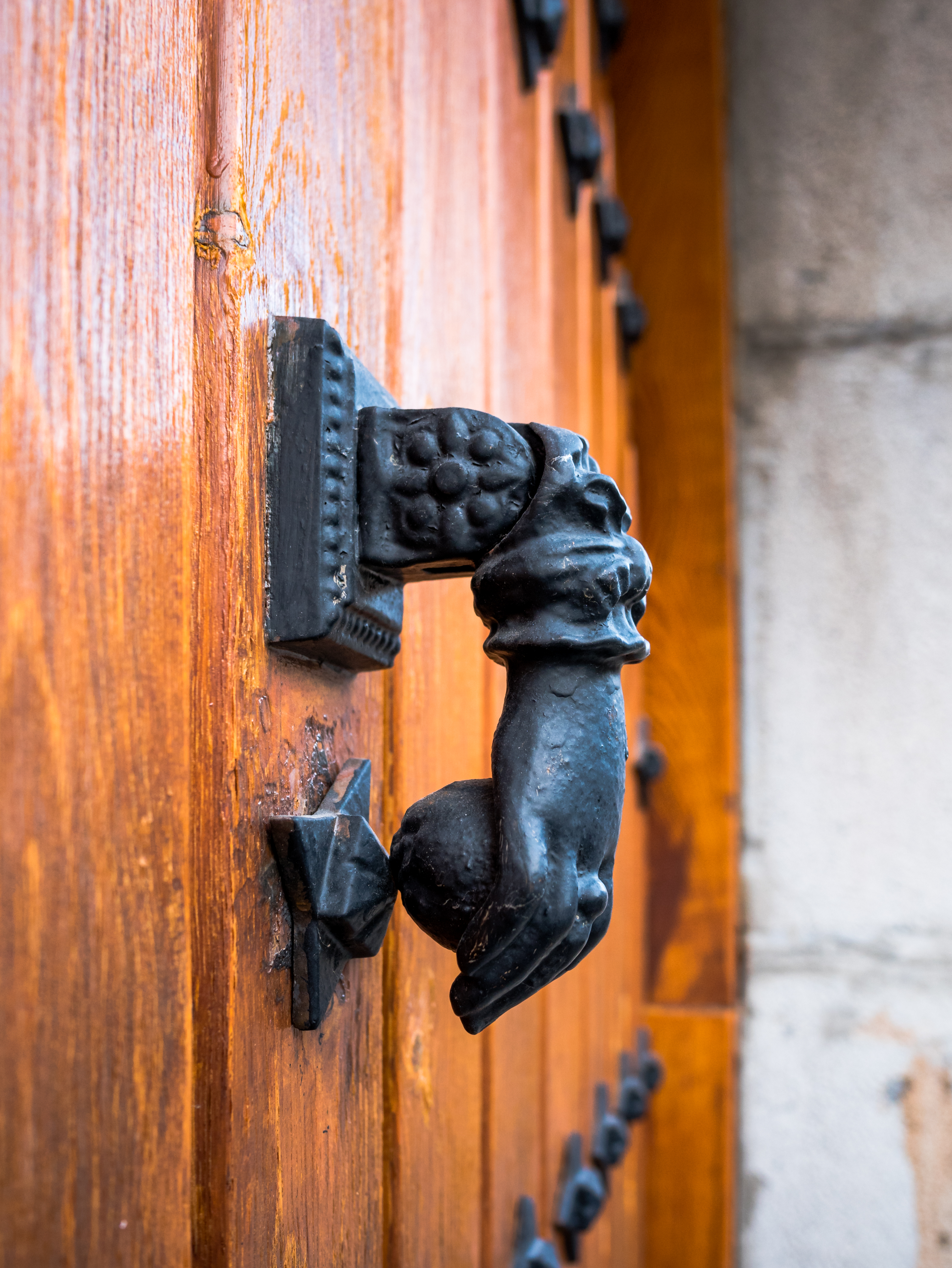
Hand-shaped door knocker in Spain

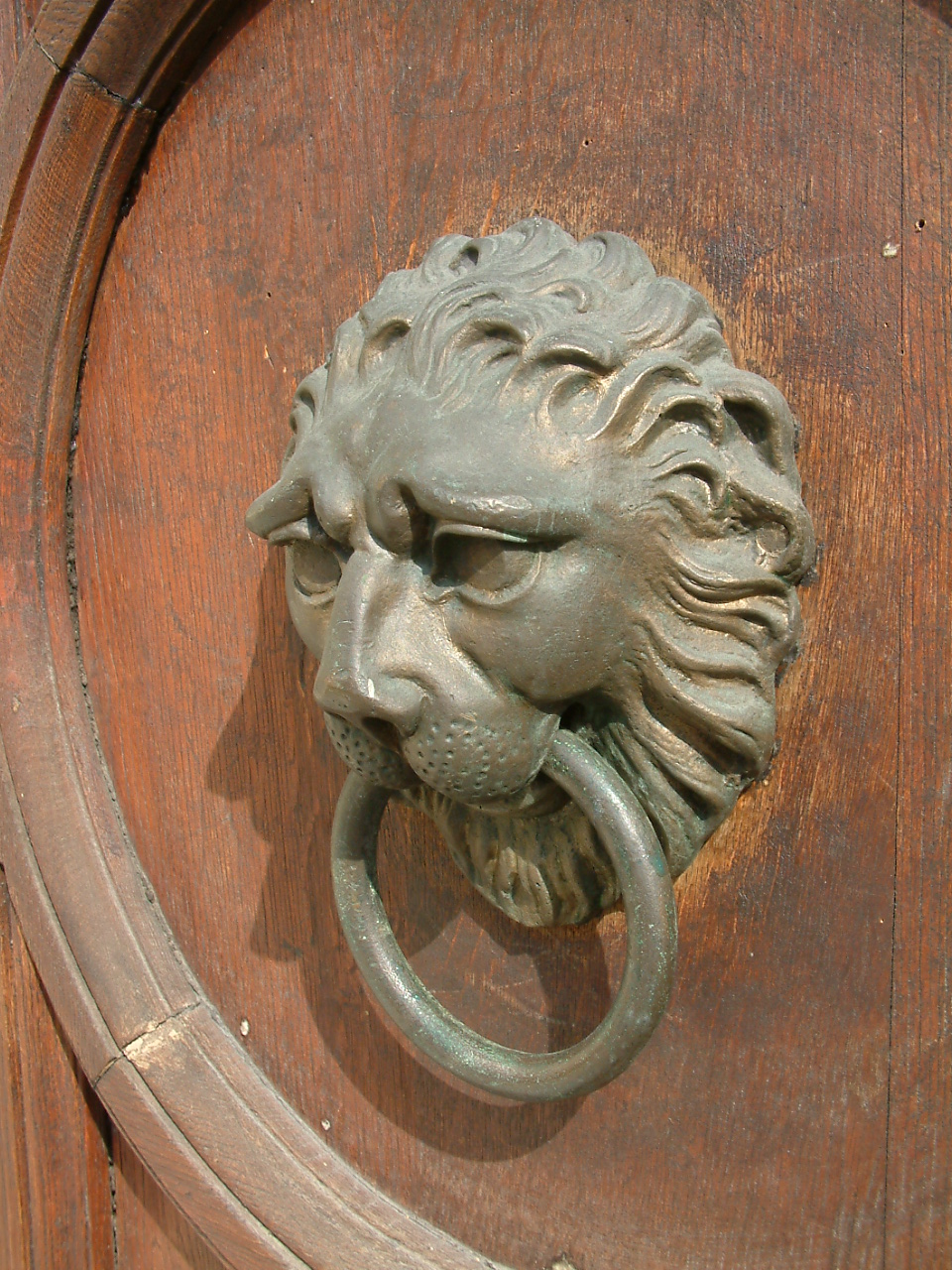
Lion head door knocker at the Raczyńskich Library

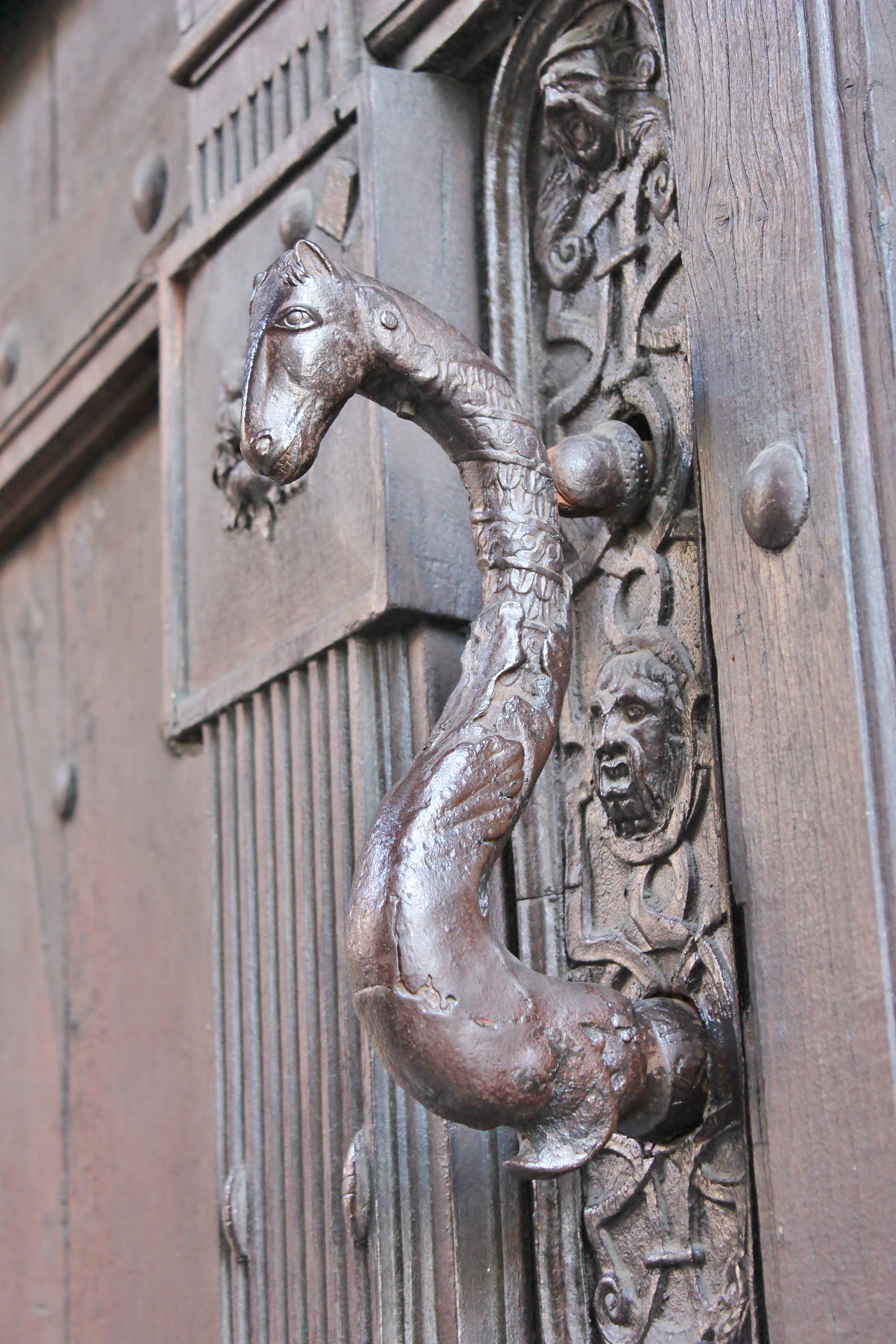
Renaissance door knocker in Toulouse, France

== See also ==
- Doorbell
- Door handle
- Knocking on doors
