= Tassel =

Hanging ornament consisting of bundled threads or cords

Diagram of a tassel

A tassel is a finishing feature in fabric and clothing decoration. It is a universal ornament that is seen in varying versions in many cultures around the globe. In the West, tassels were originally a series of windings of thread or string, and were later made with turned wooden moulds. In the sixteenth century, French tassel-makers known as passementiers formed a guild which required a seven-year apprenticeship.

== History and use ==
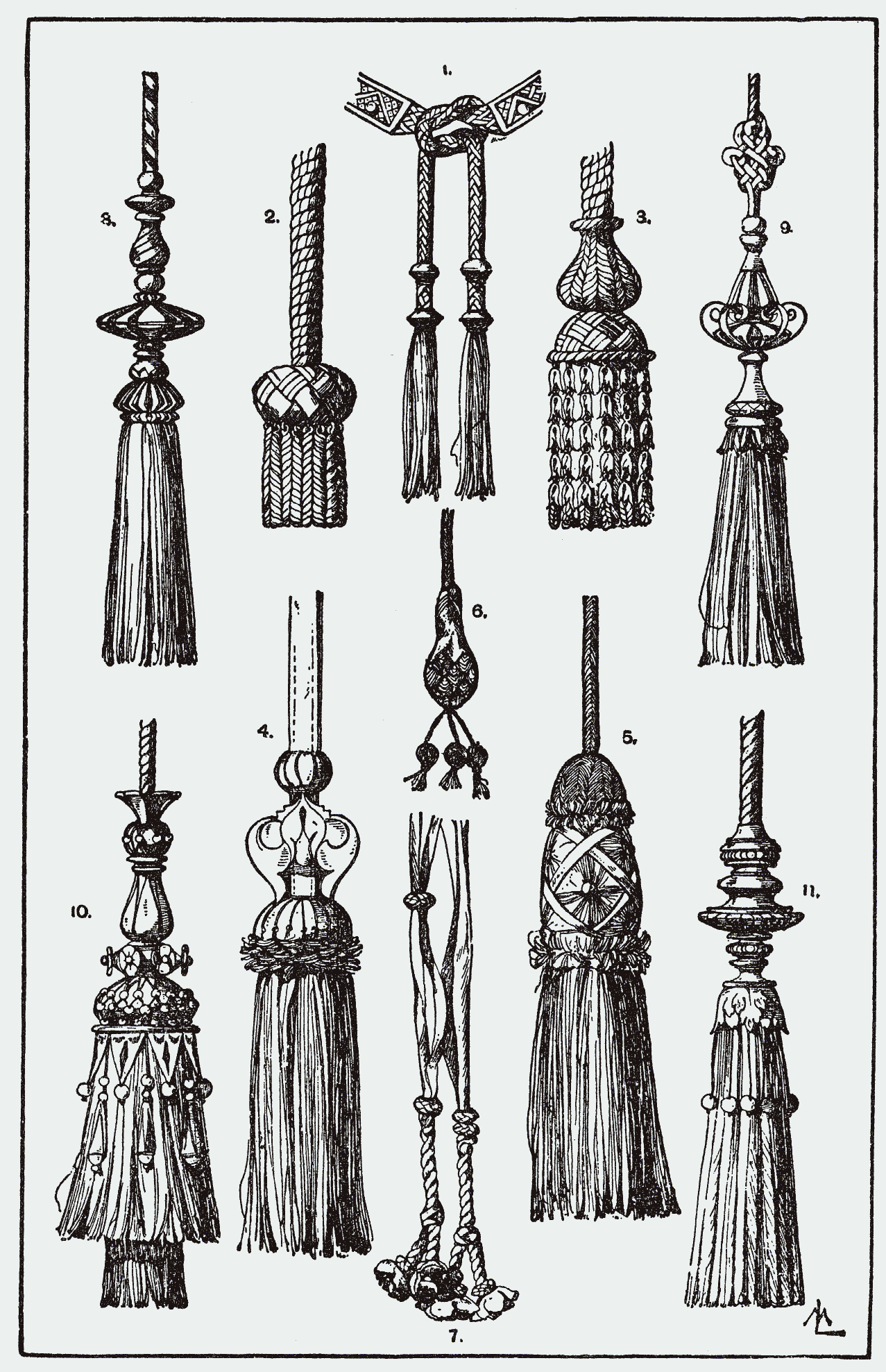
Illustration of various tassels, from A Handbook of Ornament, by Franz Sales Meyer

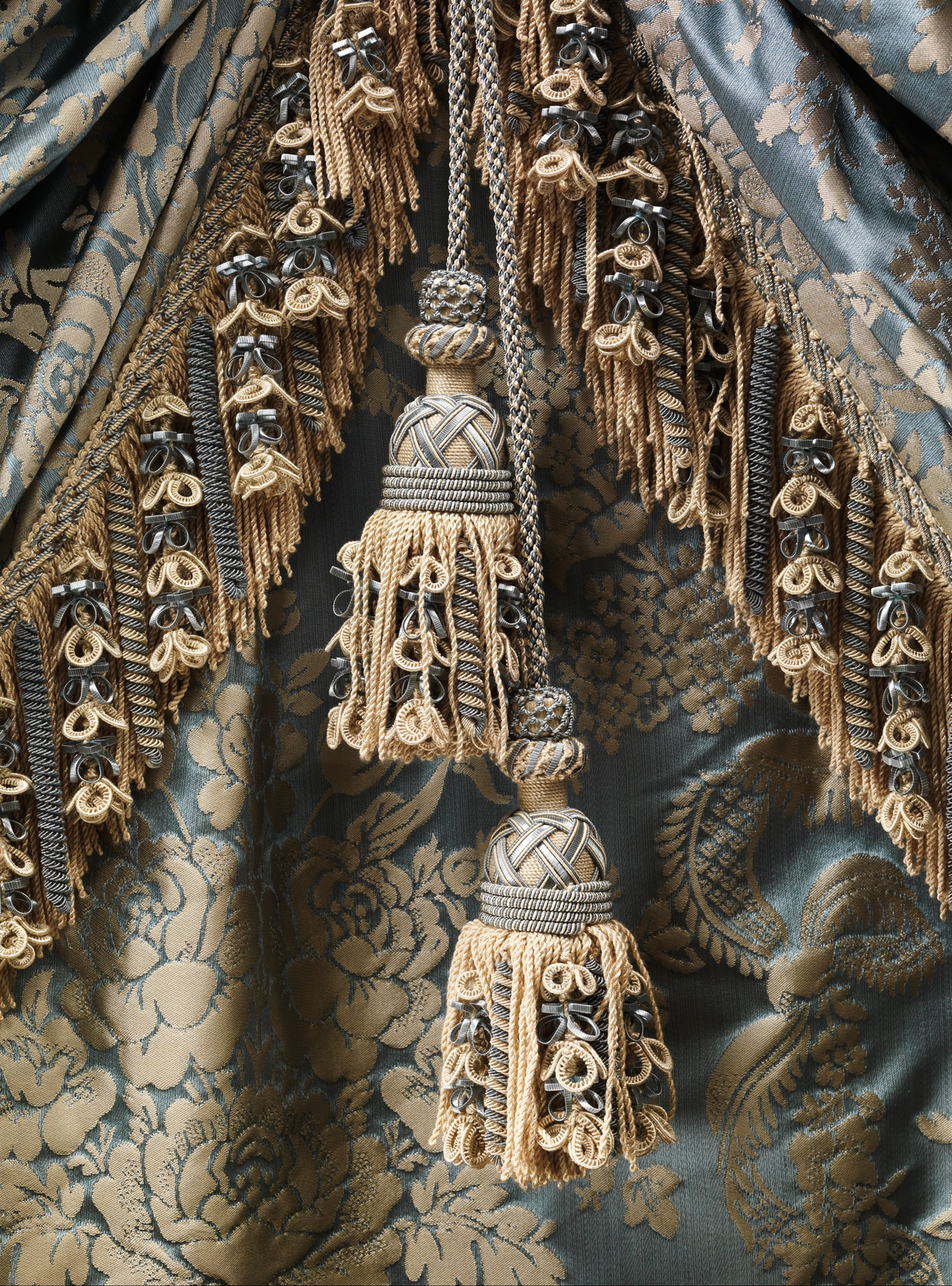
Tassels of a bed from Paris, circa 1782–1783, in the Metropolitan Museum of Art (New York City)

In the Hebrew Bible, the Lord spoke to Moses instructing him to tell the Israelites to make tassels (Hebrew tzitzit) on the corners of their garments, to help them to remember all the commandments of the Lord and to keep them (Numbers 15:37-40), and as a sign of holiness. The religious Hebrew tassel, however, bears little resemblance to the decorative one which appeared and eventually became popular in Europe, especially France and Spain.

In the West, tassels were originally a series of windings of thread or string around a suspending string until the desired curvature was attained. Later, turned wooden moulds, which were either covered in simple wrappings or much more elaborate coverings called satinings, were used. This involved an intricate binding of bands of filament silk vertically around the mould by means of an internal "lacing" in the bore of the mould. During the Middle Ages tassels were widely used in Spain as ornamentation for horses, called borla from the Latin term burrula which means "wool of little value".

These constructions were varied and augmented with extensive ornamentations that were each assigned an idiosyncratic term by their French creators. In sixteenth-century France these individuals were called passementiers, and an apprenticeship of seven years was required to become a master in one of the subdivisions of the guild. The French widely exported their very artistic work, and at such low prices that no other European nation developed a mature "trimmings" industry. Many of the passementiers, however, were among the Protestant Huguenots who fled France in the 1600s to escape persecution, taking their tools and skills with them. Tassels and their associated forms changed style throughout the years, from the small and casual of Renaissance designs (see example), through the medium sizes and more staid designs of the Empire period to the Victorian Era with the largest and most elaborate decorative flourishes. Some of these designs are returning today from the European and American artisans, who may charge a thousand dollars for a single hand-made tassel. The majority of the world's tassel production, however, takes place in China which mass-produces and exports them globally.

Tassels (also called tufts) were traditionally worn by Oxford and Cambridge University undergraduates on their caps, those wearing gold tassels were those who had paid for the status of gentleman-commoner, thus receiving increased social prestige and more luxurious accommodation than ordinary commoners who wore plain black tassels on their caps. Today, only the Chancellor of Oxford wears a gold tassel.

In the Middle East, tassels were worn as talismans, especially on headwear. In Egypt, Mesopotamia, and throughout the Arab world tassels were worn by children on hoods or caps to protect them from malevolent spirits and ward off demons.

=== Ceremonial wear ===
In the U.S., tassels, or liripipes, are also found on mortarboards during university graduation ceremonies and possibly upon the shoes of the graduates at the ceremony. Near the conclusion of the graduation ceremony, the tassel that hangs from the graduate's mortarboard is moved from the right to the left. Typically, the entire graduating class does this in unison.

== Structure ==
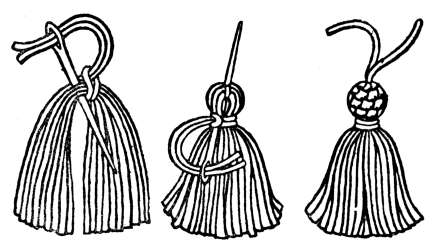
Making a tassel from yarn

A basic key tassel is made by binding or otherwise gathering threads from cord and creating a knot. Tassels are normally decorative elements, and as such one often finds them attached along the bottom hem of garments and curtains. The first Guild of Passementiers was created in France in the 1600s. The tassel was its primary expression, but it also included fringes, ornamental cords, galloons, pompons, rosettes, and gimps. Tassels, pompons and rosettes are point ornaments; the others are linear ornaments.

== See also ==
- Passementerie
- Tallit
- Tzitzit
- Izarband
