= Farzi (coat) =

Kind of choga (coat)

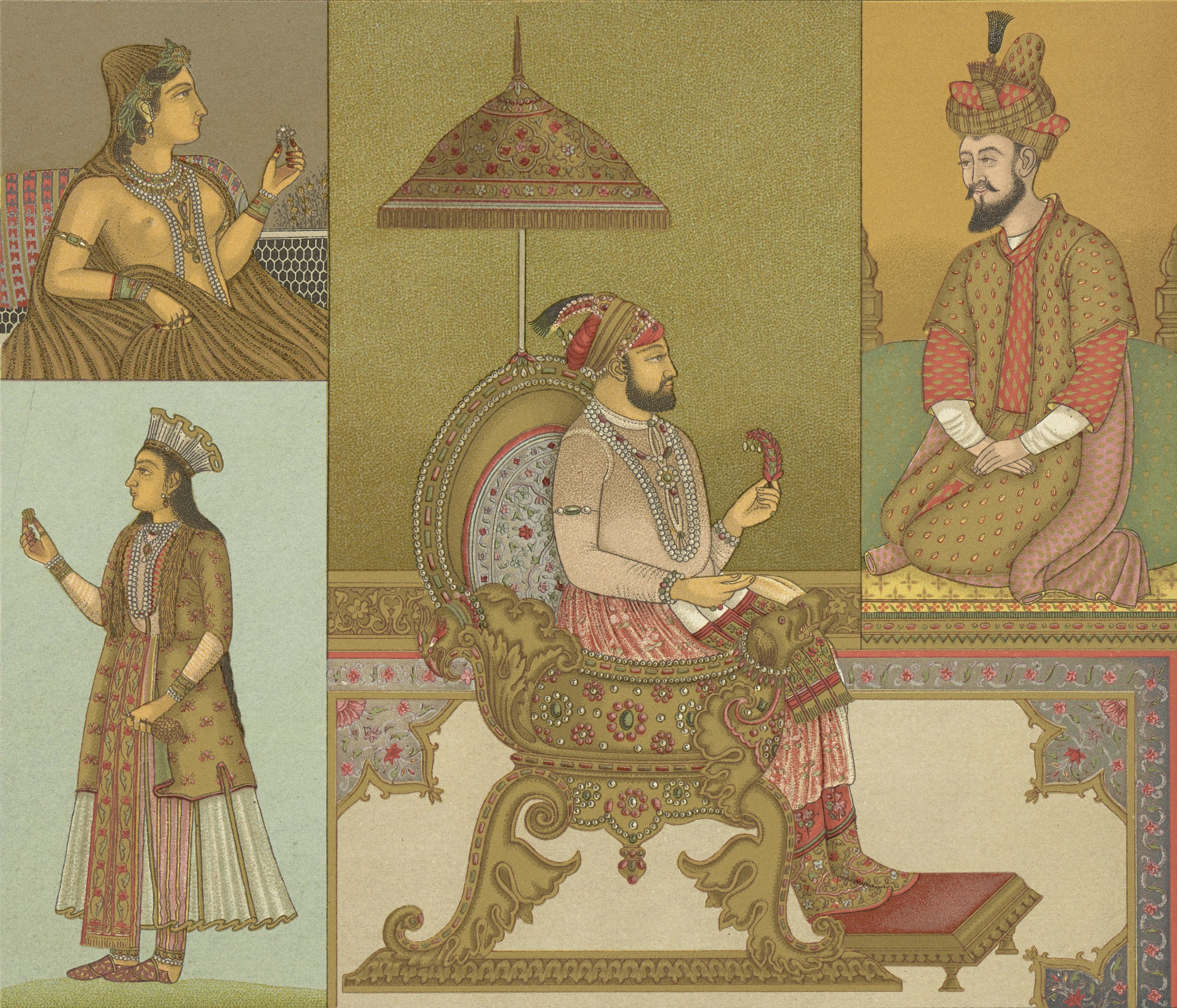
Late 19th century "Costume of India - Moguls" picture depicting Mogul woman (upper left), Mogul Emperor Farrukhsiyar (center) died 1719, and Emperor Humayun (upper right), died in 1556

Farzi refers to an outer garment of the Mughal court. It was a coat with short sleeves and fur collars, opened in front. The length was shorter than Jama. Farzi was a winter's garment. Mughal emperors and courtiers were wearing it over the Jama, fastened with a decorated piece of cloth, i.e., Katzeb around the waist area with loosely hanging ends. Farzi was one of the costumes given in Khilat (robes of honour) to the Mughal nobles and other courtiers. The coat was very much famous in the 17th century among the royals.

== See also ==
- Mughal clothing
- Tubada
