= Tubada =

Tubada may refer to:

- Melaleuca phoenicea, a bottlebrush plant also known as Tubada
- Tubada (coat), an Indian traditional garment
