= Katzeb =

Kind of sash

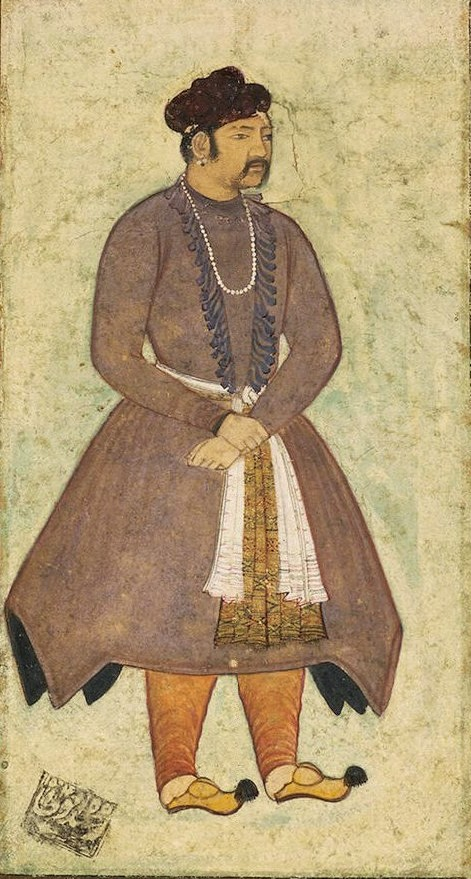
Akbar wearing a white Katzeb

Katzeb (kamarband, Kayabandh, Cummerbund) was an article of dress encircling the body, at the waist with ends hanging in the front. It was a kind of sash also called patka.

== Name ==
Katzeb is a compound word. The Sanskrit word Kati means waist, and Zeb in Persian means adorn. Mughals wore it over the Jama (coat). The Katzeb is a girdle named by the third Mughal emperor Akbar who was very fashion enthusiastic and gave a new name to many contemporary costumes. These are described in Ain-i-Akbari by Abu'l-Fazl ibn Mubarak.

== Court costume ==
Katzeb was a small rectangular piece of cloth but it was an essential garment of the dress that includes a jama (a coat), shawl, turban tanzeb (trouser). There are many Mughal paintings of the emperors with a sword or dagger tucked in Katzeb.

== Styles ==
The katzeb is simple cloth belt like garment possible with many variants such as plain, laced, embroidered, brocaded or printed.

== See also ==
- Izarband
- Jama (coat)
- Farzi (coat)
