= Izarband =

String to tie dresses

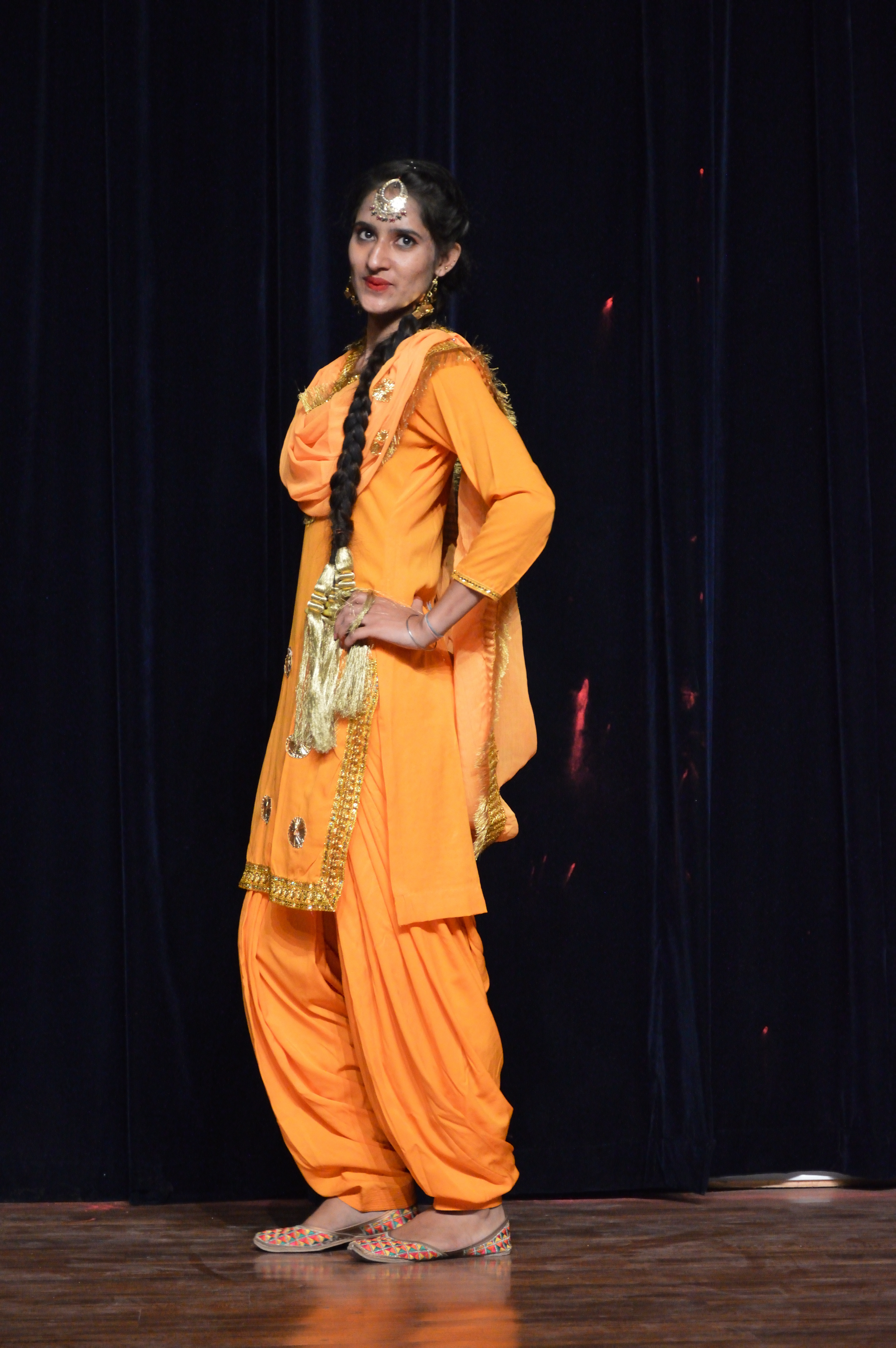

Izarband (naada, izārband, Izar band, Kamarband, Kamar Ki Patti and Patka, ازار بند) is a kind of girdle. Izarband is used to tie the upper part of various dresses such as salwar, pajamas, ghagra, petticoat, etc., in the Indian subcontinent. The said garments have the upper side turned inwards and stitched to make a narrow tubular passage, in which the izarband passes, there is one opening in the front side to collect and tie/ knot the ends. Izarband was one of the accessory (closures) items of textiles produced in the Punjab region. The Izarband is similar to a drawstring but narrower than a katzeb or a sash.

== Types and use ==
The structure is formed with a net weave, materials used for Izarband are generally white cotton and colored silk. There are many decorated variants of Izarbands sometimes ending with ornamental tassels. Izarband aid in several ethnic lowers mainly support, tie and gather a bigger dress circumference, such as patiala salwar and ghagra.

Seven colored Izarband were called "Izarband haft rang".

== The word ==
The word Izar band is from the Hindustani language, a string (waistband) that encompasses the waist. Izarband is a combined word of Izar and band. Where izār means pa’ejáma (pajama) and a band is to tie or hold the same.

== See also ==
- Kacchera
- Katzeb
