= Knocking on doors =

Social etiquette

Sargeant knocking on a door to request entrance.

Knocking on a door is a common social convention used to signal one's presence and request entry into a private or semi-private space, such as a home, office, or room. It is typically performed by striking the door with one's knuckles or hand to produce an audible sound.

== Social function ==
Knocking forms part of what conversation analysts describe as a summons–answer sequence: a patterned interaction where the knock serves as a summons and a verbal or physical response (like opening the door) completes the exchange and initiates social contact.

According to Goodwin and Goodwin, physical thresholds such as doorways serve as key sites for the creation and negotiation of social relationships. The act of knocking, followed by the occupant’s response, is one of the rituals through which interpersonal boundaries are navigated and new interactions are initiated.

== Cultural and legal significance ==
Cultural norms governing knocking vary across regions and settings. Some societies use specific knock patterns to convey informality or urgency; others substitute doorbells or vocal greetings. Entering without knocking can be deemed impolite or presumptuous.

In legal contexts, especially within common-law jurisdictions like the United States, the act of knocking underpins protocols such as "knock and announce," which rely on the assumption that residents expect a non‑confrontational summons before entry.

== See also ==
- Etiquette
- Privacy
- Doorbell
- Right of entry
