= Jama (coat) =

Long coat

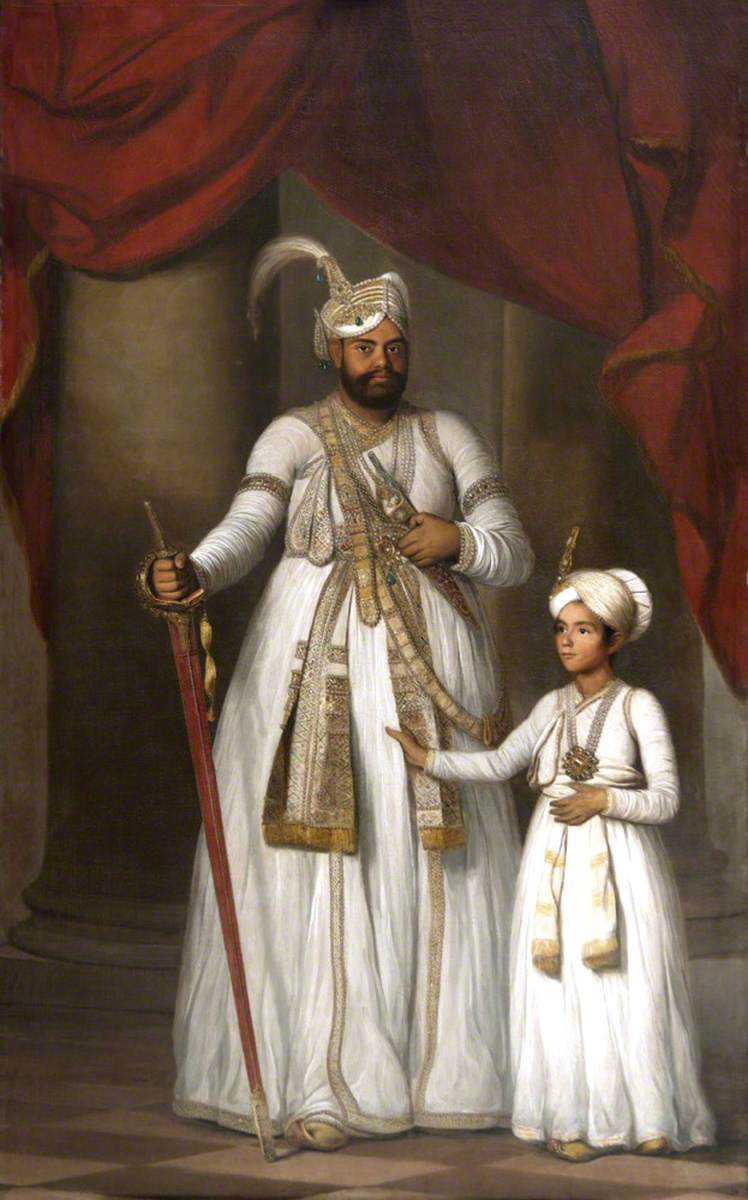
Jama, worn by the Nawab of Carnatic and his son.

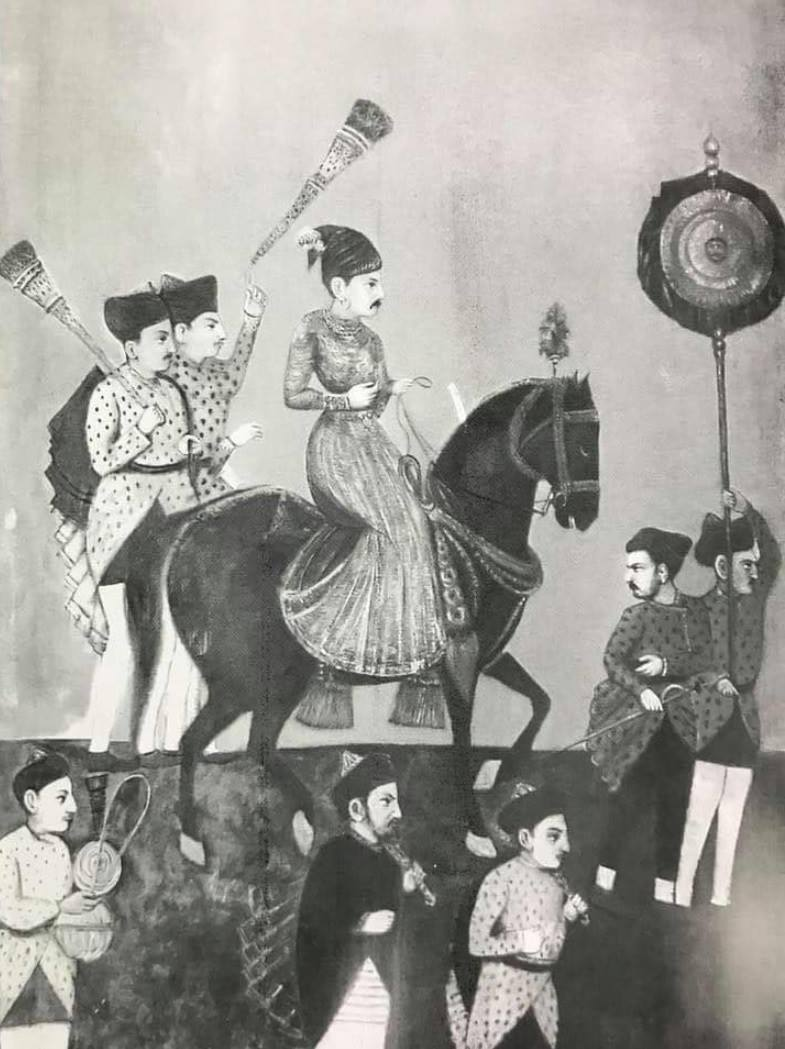
Maratha ruler Rajaram I wearing a Jama.

The term jama (Hindustani: जामा, جام; Bengali: জামা; Odia: ଜାମା ) refers to a long coat which was popular in the Indian Subcontinent during the early modern era.

== Styles ==
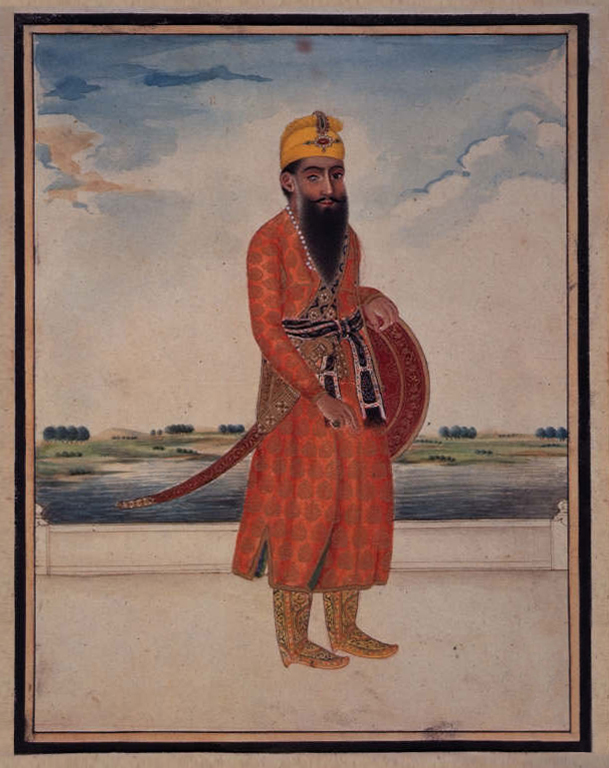
Maharaja Ranjit Singh wearing in 1829. the Sikh version of the Jama was shorter.

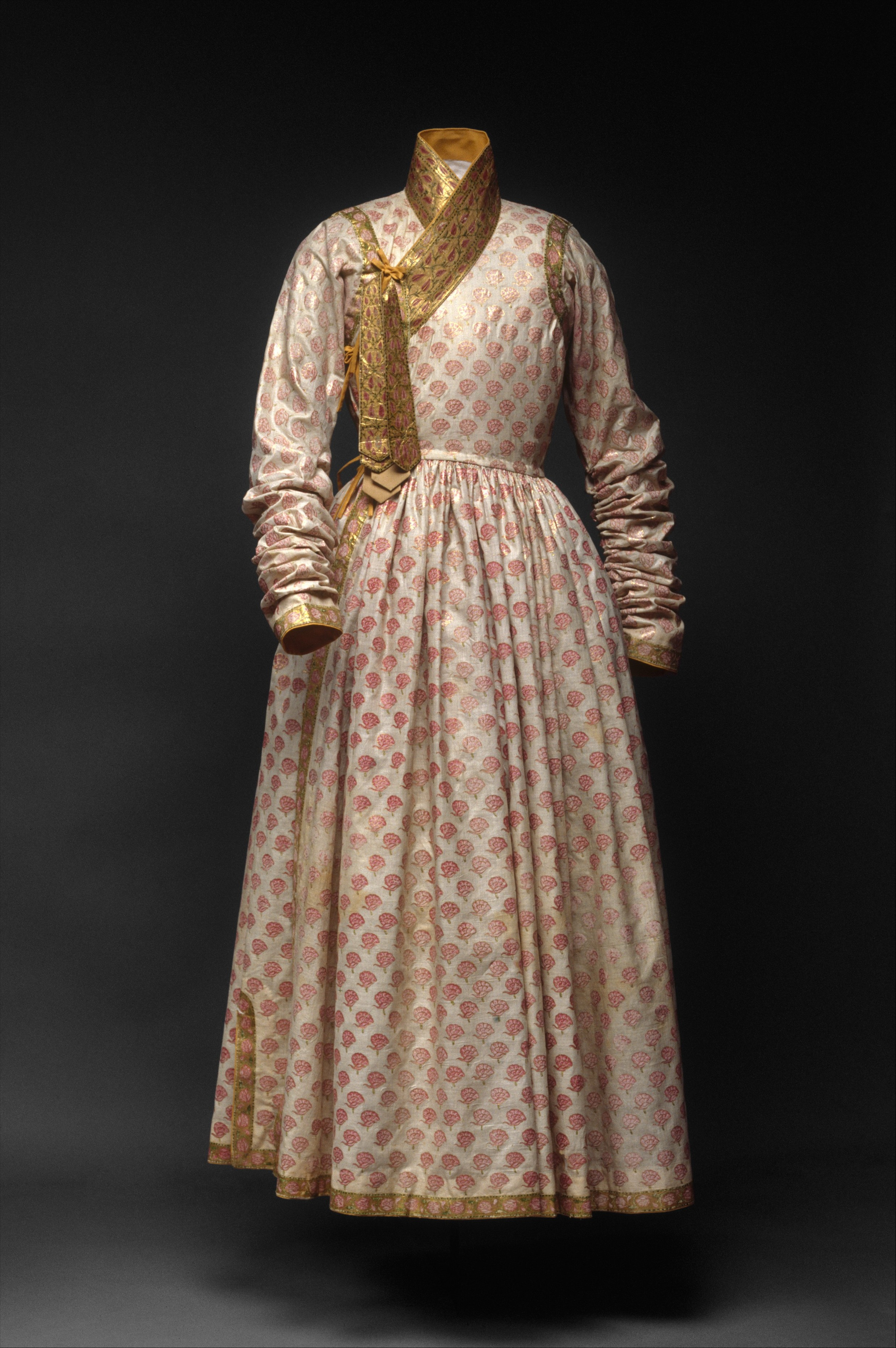
A Deccan version of the Jama. The Metropolitan Museum of Art

Some styles of the jama were tight around the torso but flared out like a skirt to below the knees or the ankles.

- The chakman jama, ended at around the knees. The sleeves tended to be full. The jama was fastened to either side with strings with some styles also opening at the front. What was originally male dress was also adopted by women who wore the jama with a scarf and tight fitting pajamas. The ties of the upper half of the jama are taken under the armpit and across the chest.
- Chakdar jama Jama with chaks (slits) was a particular style of jama. It was the pointed jama which was like the standard Mughal jama but the skirt fell in four to six points instead of the circular hem of the Mughal jama. This jama may be derived from the Rajput court's takauchiah and therefore could be of local origin.
- During the Sikh reign the jama was no longer flowing but shorter and often tucked up around the waist to allow freedom of movement. A similar dress, called the chola, was worn by the Sikhs Gurus.
- During the 19th and 20th centuries A.D. the jama was reduced to a shirt like garment in the northern (upper) parts of British India.
- Farzi (coat) was a coat with short sleeves and fur collars, opened in front. The length was shorter than Jama. Farzi was a winter's garment. Mughal emperors and courtiers were wearing it over the Jama, fastened with a decorated piece of cloth, i.e., Katzeb around the waist area with loosely hanging ends.
- Hindu and Muslim Jamas – Hindus and Muslims were wearing the same garment with little different styles, Hindus were fastening the Jama on the left side of the body, and the Muslims tied it on the right-hand side.

Nimjama (Neema or Nima) was an undergarment for the upper body. The courtiers wore it underneath the costumes, such as Jama (coat). The style was similar to a vest half sleeves garment. Nimajama was aided with strings to tie in front; the length was up to the knees only, shorter than the Jama. It was an indispensable part of the Mughal attire.

== Photo gallery ==
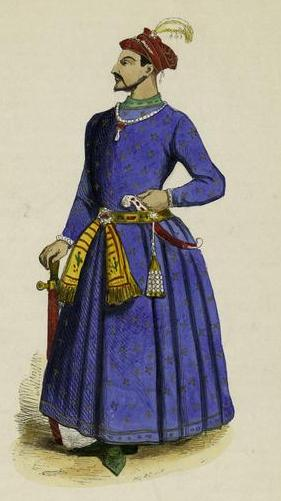
The commander of the Imperial Guard of Delhi

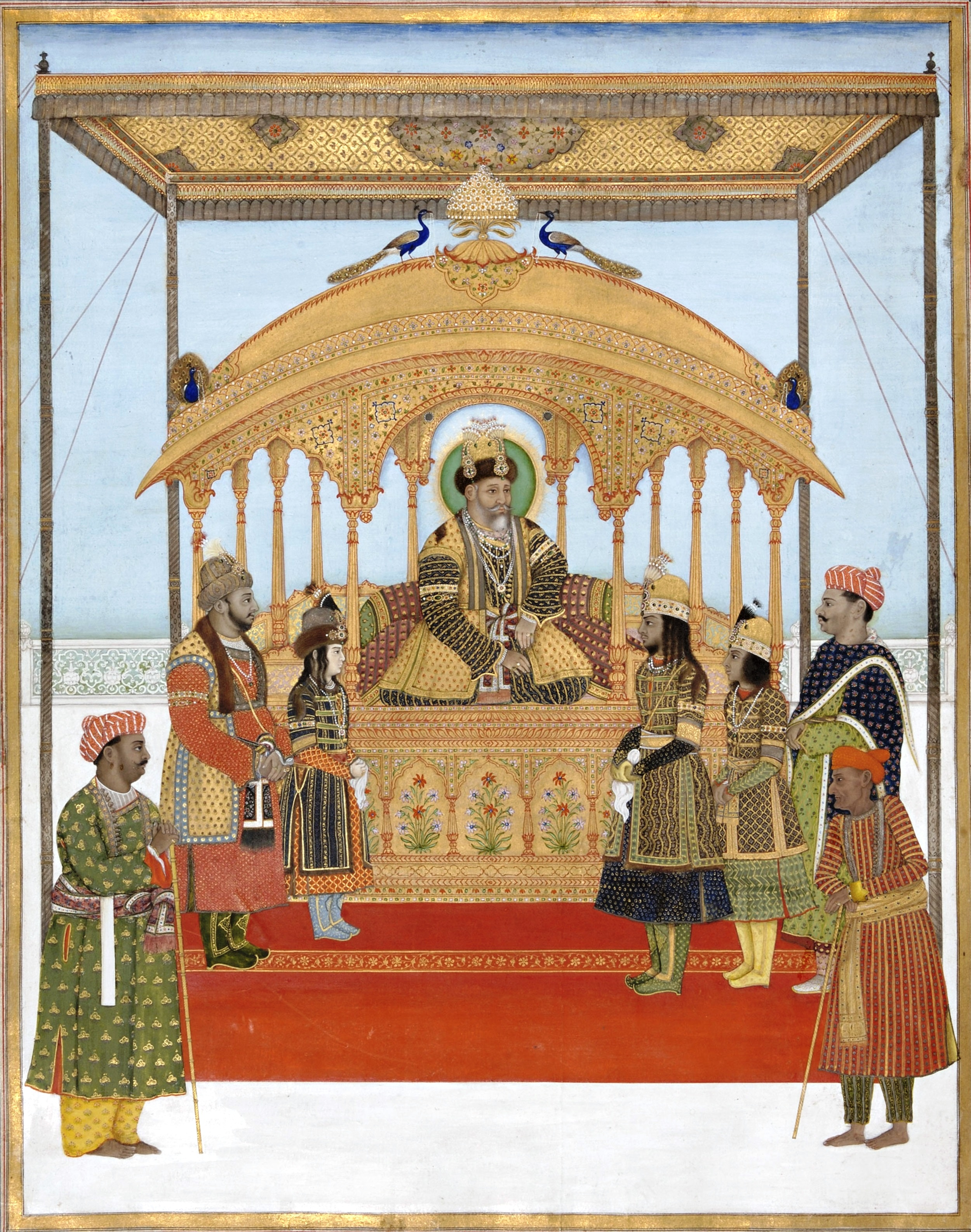
Ghulam Murtaza Khan The Delhi Darbar of Akbar II

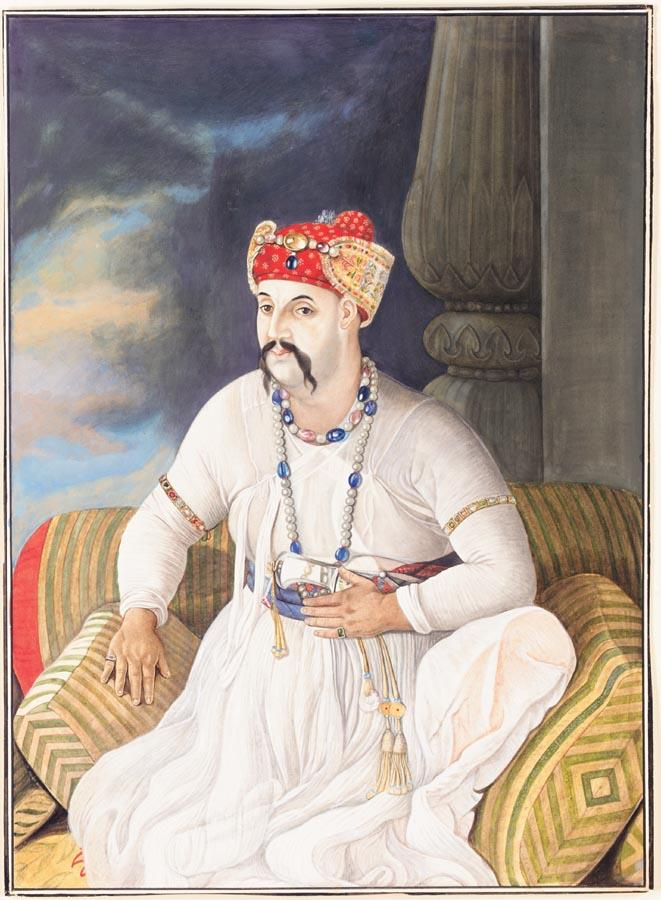
Nawab of Oudh, Asaf-ud-Daula, Lucknow, India, circa 1785–90

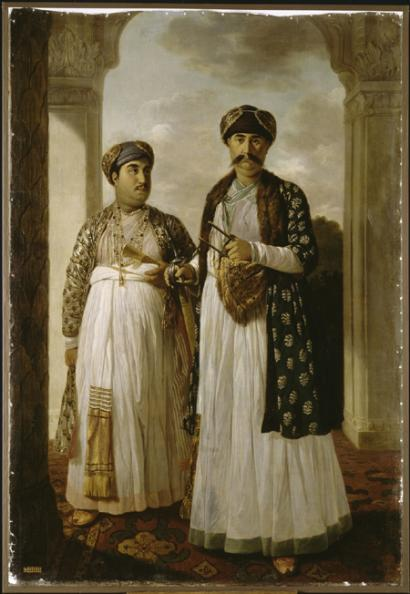
Nawab Shuja al-Daula and his heir Asaf al-Daula in Faizabad

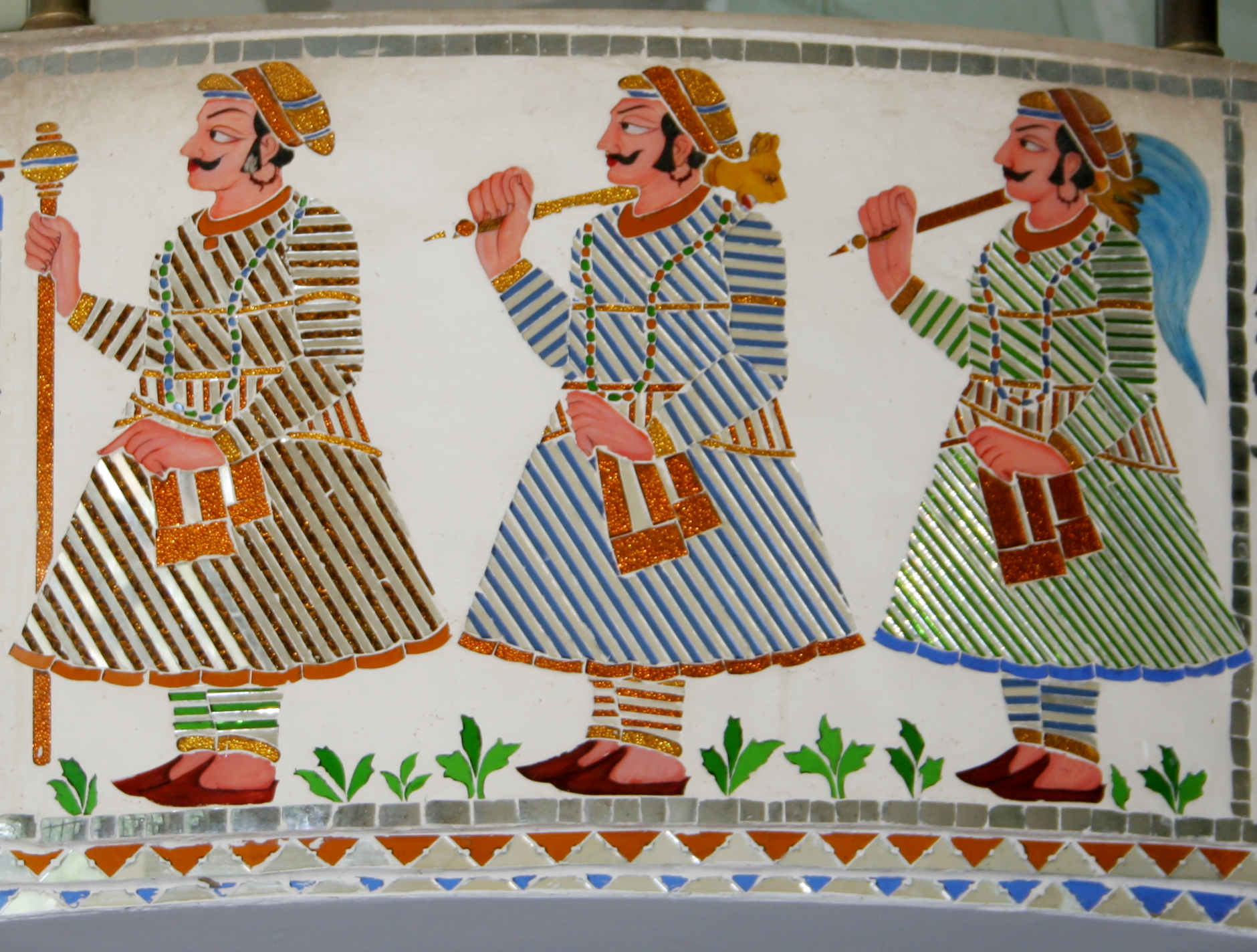
Three men in traditional dress, mosaic, Udaipur, Rajasthan, India

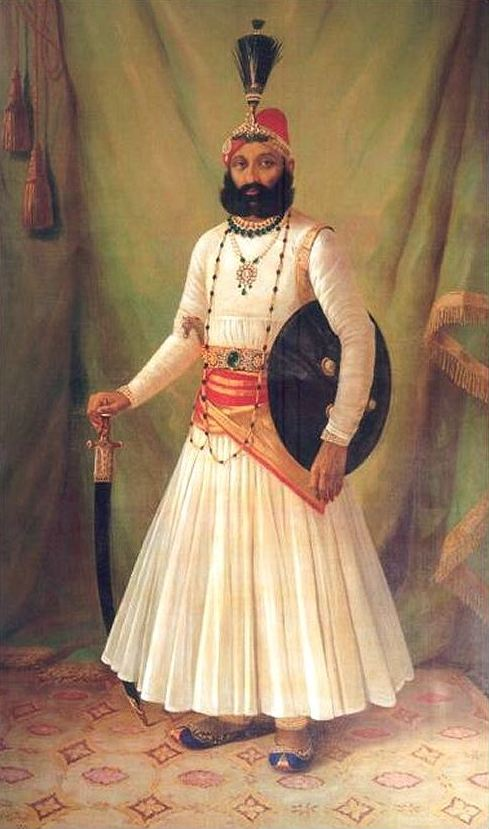
Raja Ravi Varma, Maharaja Fateh Singh

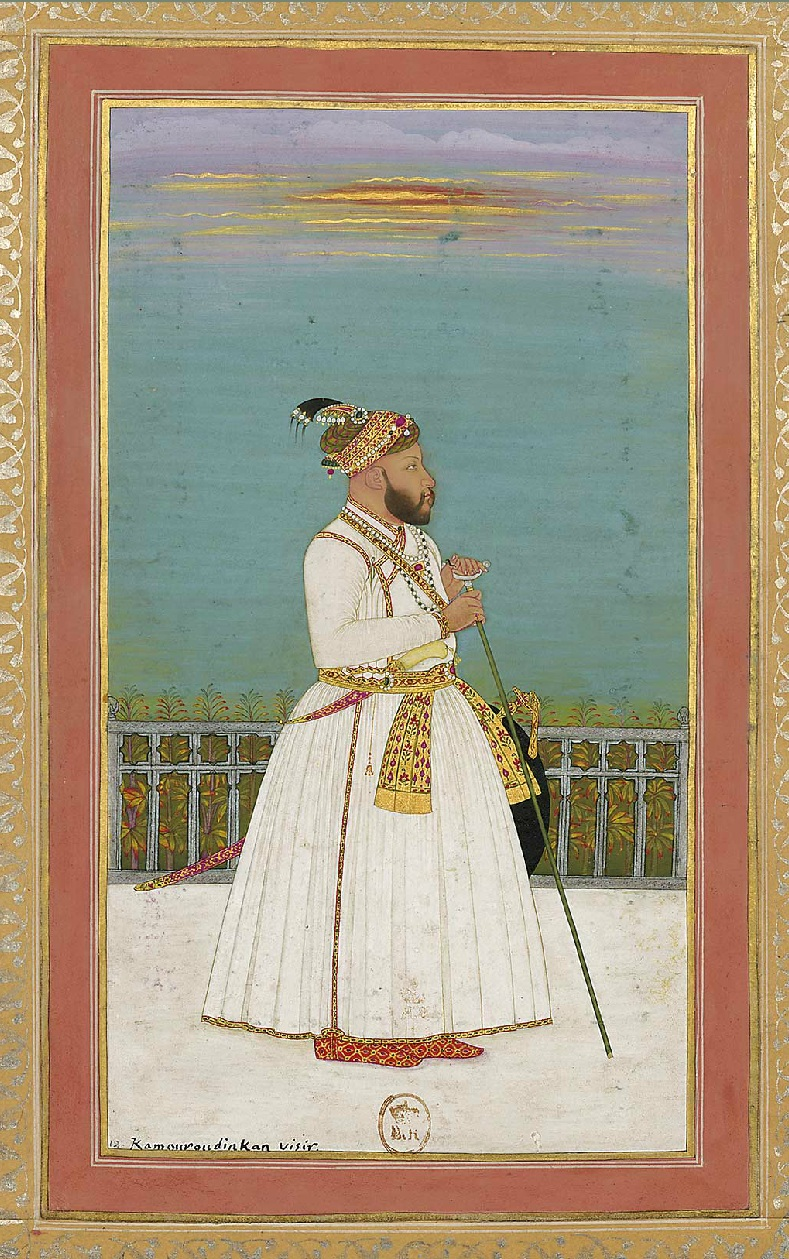
The vizier Qamar ud-Din circa 1735

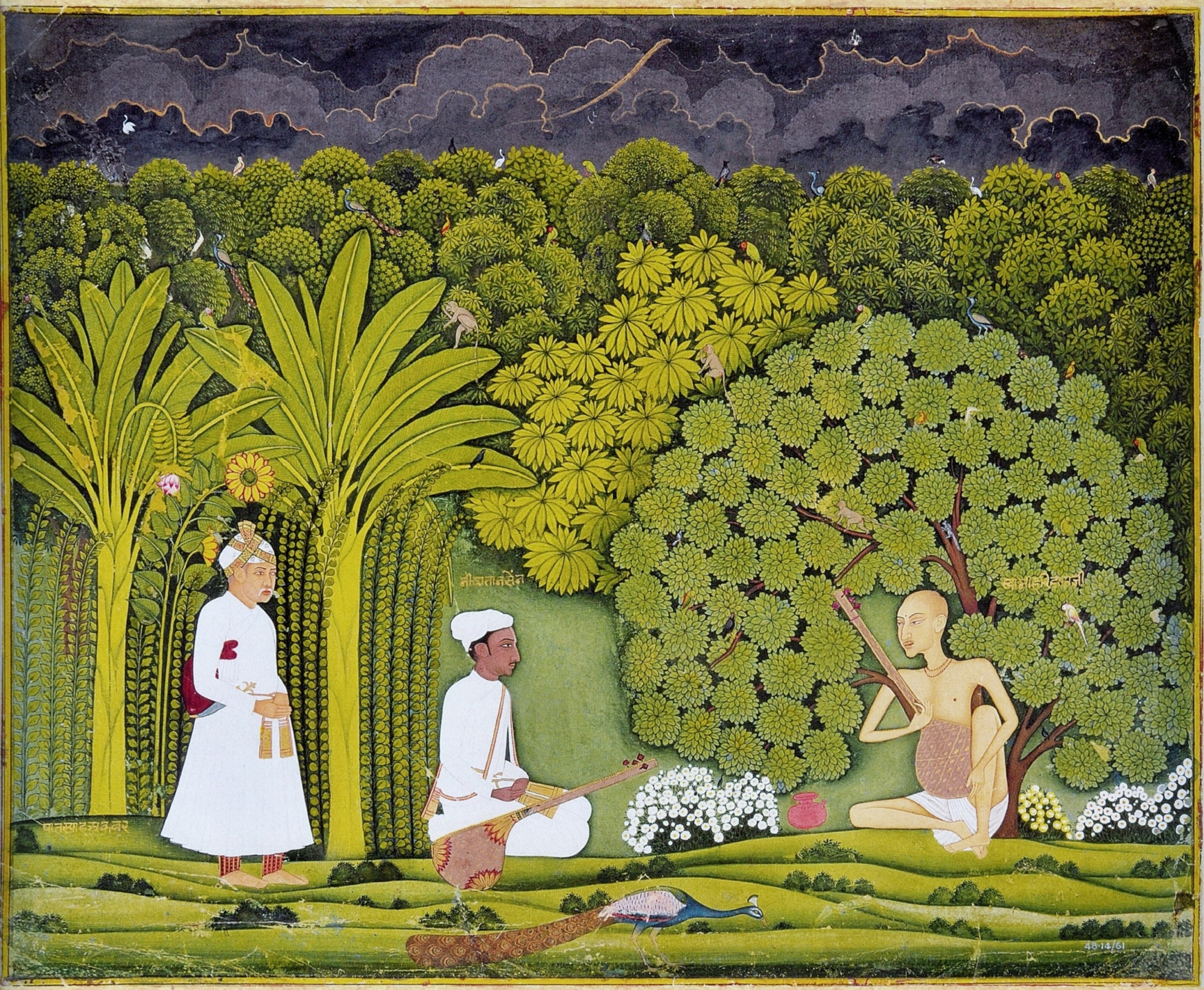
Akbar and Tansen visit Haridas

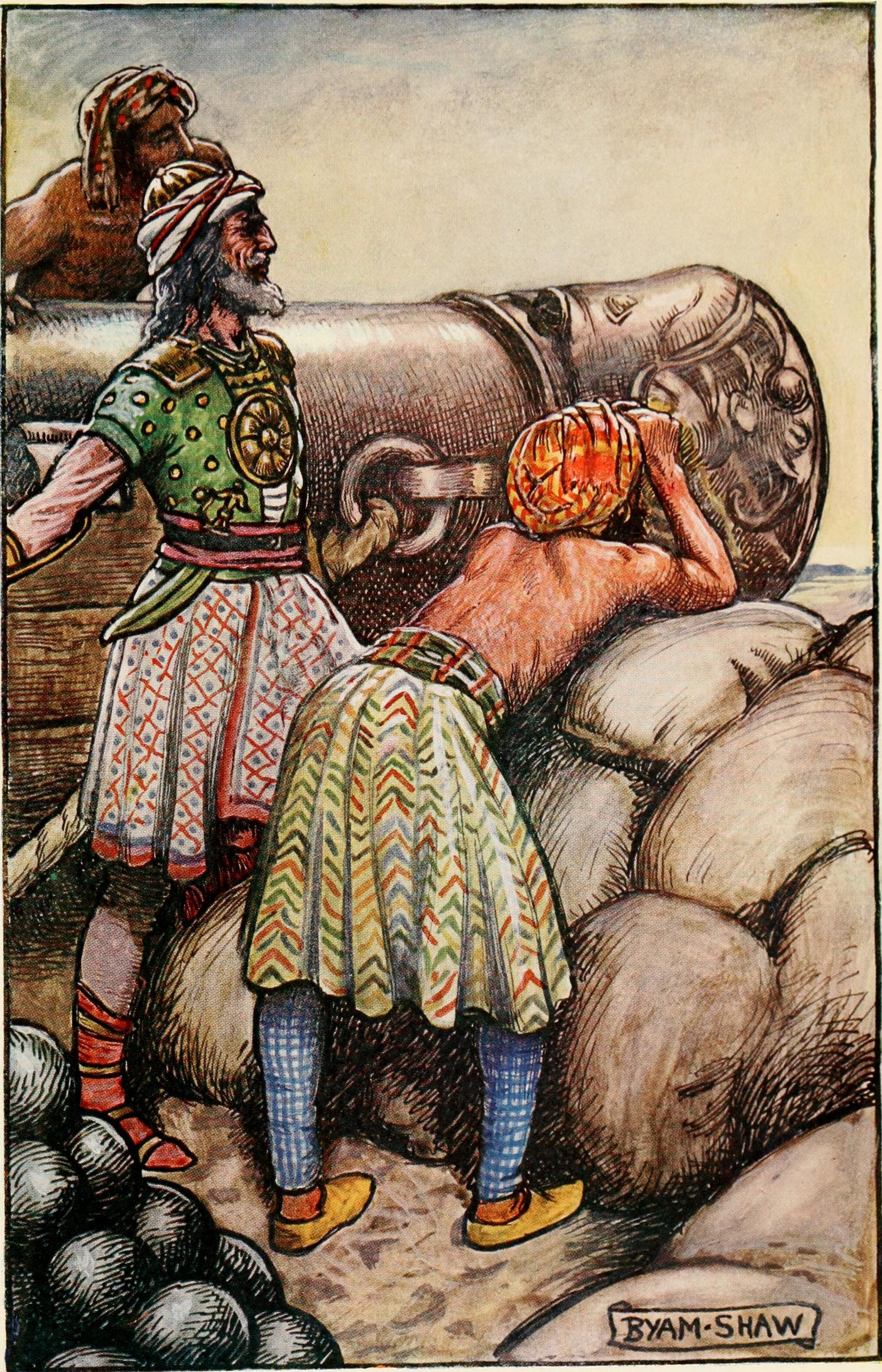
Mughal Army artillerymen during the reign of Akbar.

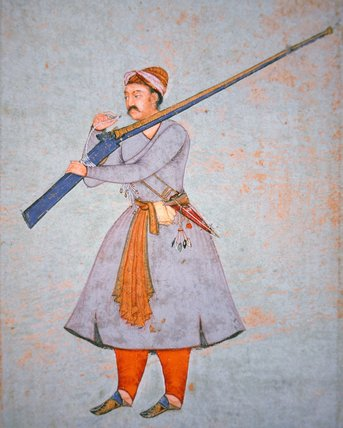
Officer of the Mughal Army, c.1585 (colour litho)

== Modern use ==
In Gujarat, the jama began to lose popularity by the end of the 19th century A.D. However, men in parts of Kutch still wear the jama also known as the angarkha which has an asymmetric opening with the skirt flaring out to around the hips. However, some styles fall to below the knees.

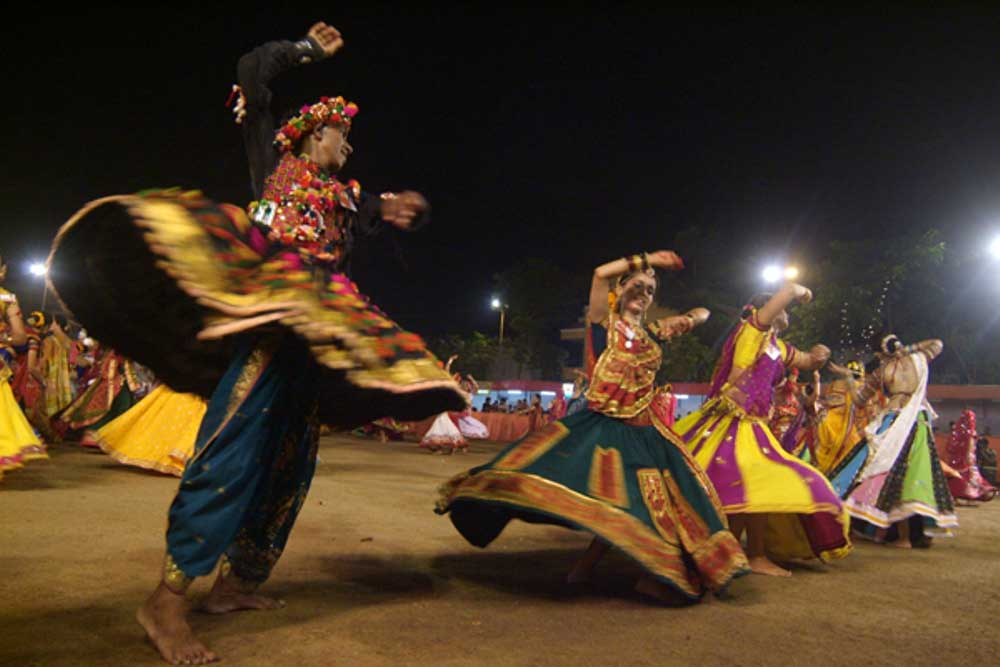
Man on the left in Gujarati jama/angarkha

== See also ==
- Dashiki
- Kaftan
- Robe
- Tunic
- Terlig
- Angarkha
- Kurta
- Katzeb
- Farzi (coat)
