= Tubada (coat) =

Indian coat

Tubada was an outer garment for men in India. It was a coat, part of a Hindu's costume in the early 19th century. John Forbes Watson mentions it as a ''wide great coat'' in his book The Textile Manufactures and the Costumes of the People of India, London, 1866.

== See also ==
- Achkan
- Jama (coat)
- Mujib coat
- Nehru jacket
