= Franz Sales Meyer =

- Born: 9 December 1849; Kenzingen, Germany
- Died: 6 November 1927 (aged 77); Karlsruhe, Germany
- Known for: Ornament
- Notable work: A handbook of Ornament

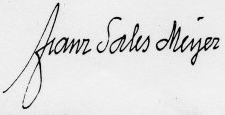
Franz Sales Meyer's signature

Franz Sales Meyer (9 December 1849 – 6 November 1927) was a German professor of ornament, author, poet and painter.

== Life ==
Franz Sales Meyer was born on 9 December 1849 in Kenzingen, Breisgau area. From 1866 to 1868, he attended the seminary in Meersburg, then moved to the Karlsruhe Polytechnic, where he completed his training in 1871 for industrial art teaching. In 1873, he accepted to the faculty of the Grand Ducal School of Applied Arts in Karlsruhe and, in 1878, he was appointed as a teacher. After a short illness, Franz Sales Meyer died on 6 November 1927 in Karlsruhe.

== Awards ==
- 1915 Honorary Citizen of the town of Meersburg
- 1915 Honorary Citizen of the city Kenzingen

== Bibliography ==
- Meyer, Franz Sales (1896). A handbook of Ornament. JM Classic Editions (published 2007). ISBN 9781905217687.
- Meyer, Franz Sales (1957). Handbook of Ornament: A Grammar of Art, Industrial and Architectural Designing in All Its Branches for Practical as Well as Theoretical Use. New York: Dover Publications. ISBN 0486203026.
