= Mughal clothing =

Clothing of the Mughal Empire

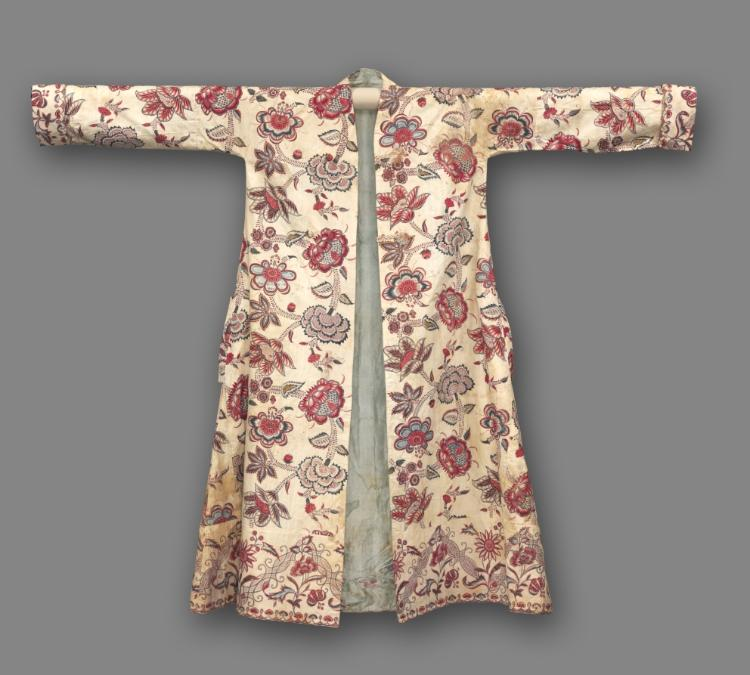
Man's morning coat, c. 1700-1750

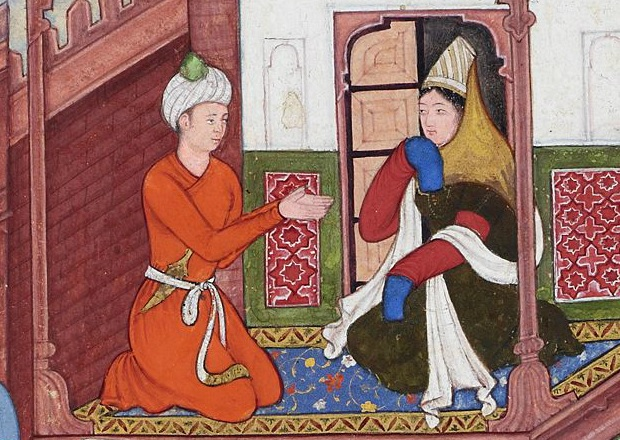
Young Babur seeks his grandmother Aisan Daulat Begum's advice, c. 1590–1592.

Mughal clothing refers to clothing worn by the inhabitants of the multi-cultural, multi-faith, and multi-ethnic Mughal Empire, whose existence spanned the 16th, 17th, and 18th centuries. Many articles of clothing worn during the Mughal period were already been in use for up to centuries before their arrival in Indian subcontinent. It was characterized by luxurious design, focusing on both the intricacy of the design, as well as the fabric itself, the majority of which was muslin, silk, velvet and brocade. Elaborate patterns including dots, checks, and waves were used with colors from various dyes including cochineal, sulfate of iron, sulfate of copper, and sulfate of antimony were used.

Men traditionally wore long over-lapping coat known as a jama with a cummerbund tied around on the waist and accompanying trousers known as paijama (loaned into English as pajama) under the jama. A pagri (turban) was worn on the head to complete the outfit. Women wore shalwar, churidar, dhilja, gharara, and farshi. Mughal fashion incorporated much jewelry, including earrings, nose jewelry, necklaces, bangles, belts, and anklets. Other clothing types included the peshwaz and yalek robes.

Mughal headware was diverse in style and widespread. Examples include the chau-goshia — a cap divided into four segments, the dome shaped qubbedar, kashiti, the embroidered dupalli and nukka dar, and the velvet mandil. Shoe styles included jhuti, kafsh, charhvan, salim shahi, and khurd nau, nearly all of which charachteristically featured curved up toes at the front. Lucknow was known for its shoes and threading embroidery with gold and silver aughi during the era. Mughal emperor turbans usually featured ornaments, which were also made of gold and precious gems such as rubies, diamonds, emeralds, and sapphire.

== Headwear ==
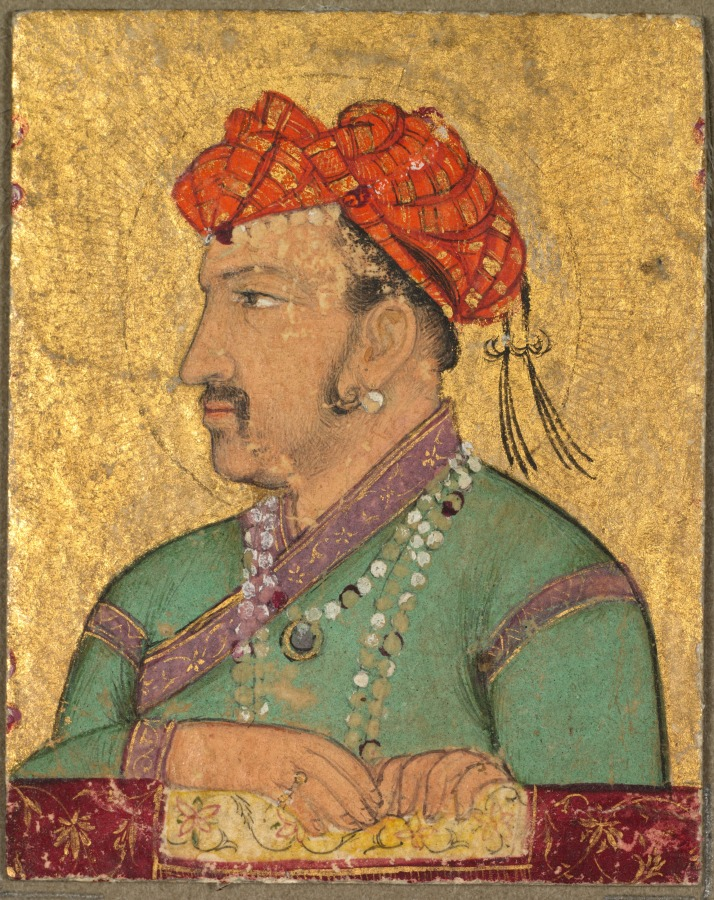
Jahangir miniature portrait, Mughal India, early 1600s

During the reign of Akbar, the typical Mughal turban was popularized which was wrapped directly on the head as it lacked a Karakul hat and involved a tight bundle in the front and an ascending slope backwards so that it bulged near the back. A turban band or sash was wrapped across the turban to keep it in place, which was usually made of a different material than the turban itself. Mughal woman's headwear consisted of silk Karakul or boqta hats of various styles which were ornamented with jewels, feathered pin and veils.

Headwear during the Mughal period
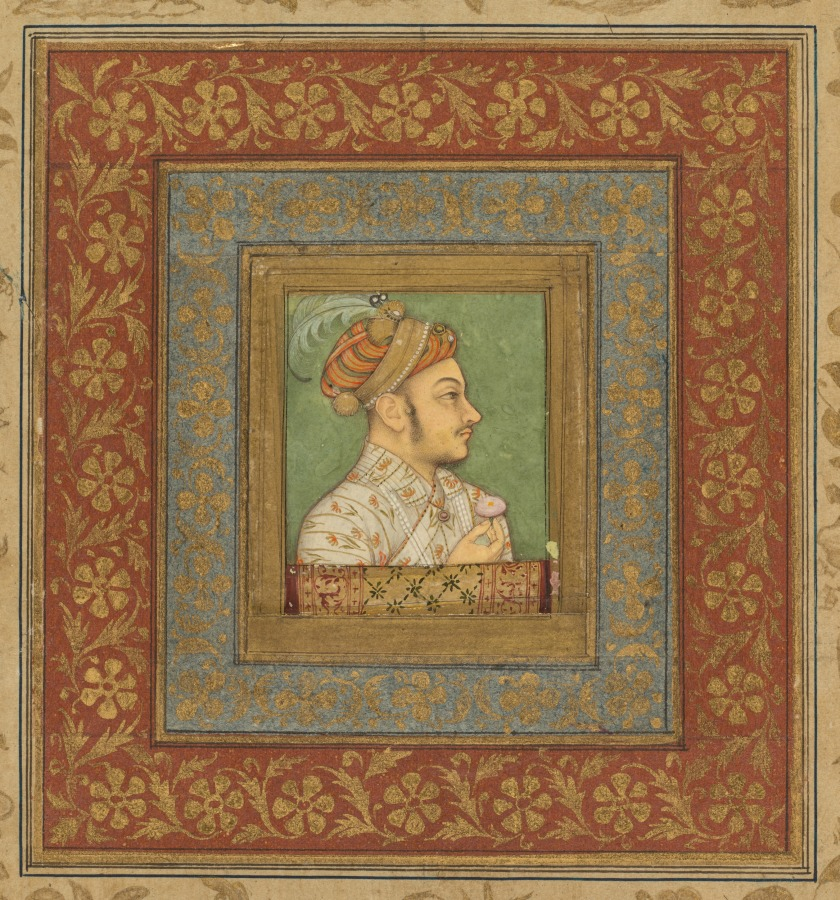
Portrait of Murad Bakhsh (1624–1661), Mughal India, attributed to Balchand

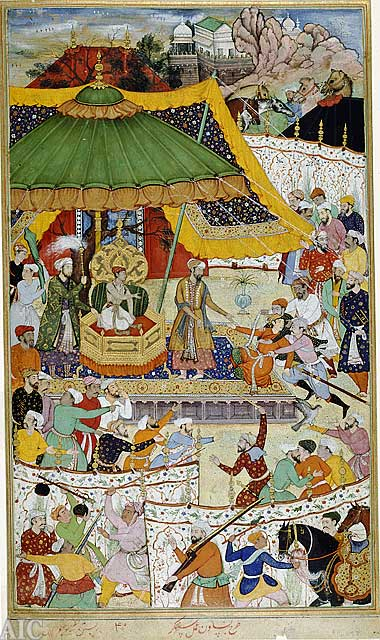
Court of Akbar

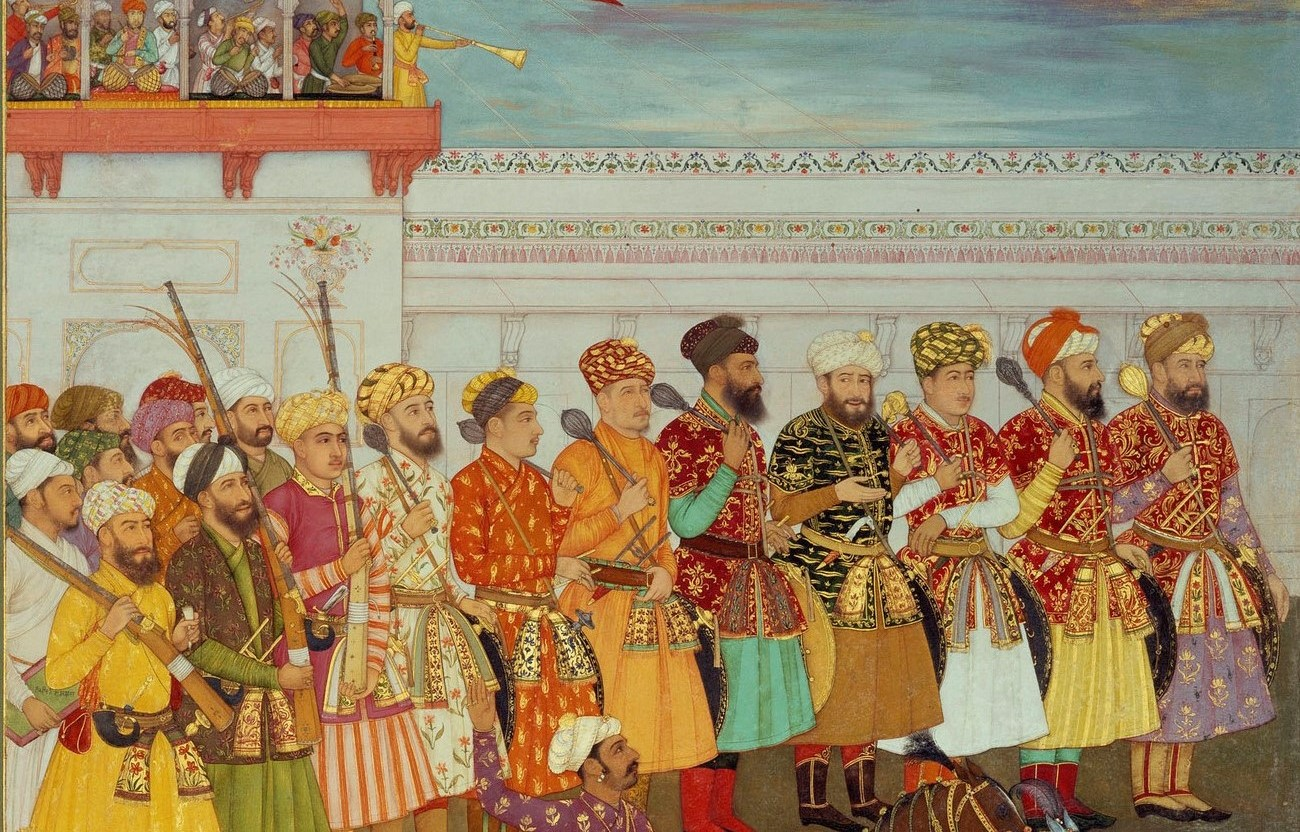
Court guards of Shah Jahan

== Men's fashion ==
=== Mugal Emperor's Costumes ===
During Emperor Akbar's reign, the common costumes donned by him were of a knee-length 'Jama', it's variant the 'Peshwaz' or the 'angrakha' fastened to the right side with short ties or at the center. The Yaktahi Jama originated in Persia and Central Asia, where it was worn both short and long, over a pai-jama to form an outfit known as the "Bast Agag". In Persian, the word "Jama" means garment, robe, gown, or coat. The definition of the Mughal Jama is a side-fastening frock coat with a tight-fitting bodice, nipped-in waist, and flared skirt, reaching the knees. In many miniature figures and paintings, Akbar is seen wearing the Jama girded at the waist with a waistband, and he accompanies it with a small, short turban without a cap and a churidar paijama. Akbar restyled the garment and developed it into a formal gown by removing slits, rounding the hemline, and increasing the fullness of the skirt. As for individual superiors working in the Mughal Court, Hindu and Muslim Jamas – Hindus and Muslims wear the same garment with little different styles, Hindus fasten the Jama on the left side of the body, and the Muslims tie it on the right-hand side.

Akbar did not limit his fashion to these costumes that were inherited from Babur and Humayun, but he brought into fashion many other garments and adapted them to his own requirements, changing the style of costume completely. For instance, he donned the 'takauchiya' – a typical Indian costume that is stitched out of silk, gold, or woolen material, making it versatile for both summer and winter climates. Embroidering his takauchiya with gold and adopting fine shawls as fabrics for his costumes, Akbar showcased the beauty of the 'doshala' – a double-faced shawl consisting of two fabrics attached at the underside with the fabric having two right sides and no wrong side double folds – in one's outfit. He inspired many to adopt similar styles, and this notified the first change from Central Asian to Indian conditions. Mughals were becoming more Indianized in the true sense of the word.

Only the emperor himself, his intimate relations, and select members of his entourage (beasts as well as men) were permitted to wear a royal turban ornament. As the empire matured, differing styles of ornament acquired the generic name of sarpech, from sar or sir, meaning head, and pech, meaning fastener. Royal portraits from Jahangir's reign show a more elaborate style of noteworthy games clustered at the base of the plume and with a pendant pearl encouraging a gentle droop from the plume itself. During Shah Jahan's reign, an entirely mineralogical version of the kalgi appeared, an ornate, heavily jeweled brooch, in which a stylized plume‟ as well as the stem was composed of gems set in gold and backed by polychrome enamel.

=== Footwear ===
There was a range of footwear that appeared during the rule of the Mughal Empire, with followers of different religions contrasting in their style. For instance, followers of Islam wore shoes and boots habitually to protect their feet from the heat and hazards of the Indian landscape. A distinctive type of footwear emerged in medieval India, the Mojari – these slippers were ornate, often woven with gold-silver zari (thread), and encrusted with jewels to display the wealth and power of its wearer. Differing from other footwear during the time, the Mojari is known for its curled front design, illustrating the luxurious and unique quality. Jahangir (1569–1627), the Mughal emperor is credited with popularizing this type of footwear among the nobility.

In addition, Mughal men wore ornamented shoes with turned-up toes, also known as the Jhuti. The Jhuti was Persian in style and was the most common form of shoe worn by visitors to Akbar's court. Juttis were originally made of pure leather with exquisite embroidery and embellishments. The soles are made of leather, and the uppers are made of either leather or fabric, frequently embroidered with gold and silver, especially in the case of a Muslim wearer.

Desi (traditional) Jutti manufactured with flat soles has no distinction of right or left foot with curled upturn toe. Over the centuries, its style and designs have evolved greatly. Today, individual artisans manufacture these leather juttis in an extensive range of colors and designs. Some other footwear that were worn by Mughal men during that time include:

- The Kafsh, worn by nobles and kings.
- The Charhvan, with a curling tongue fixed to the toe.
- The Salim Shahi, decorated in gold.
- The Khurd Nau, very lightweight, made of kid leather.

== Women's fashion ==
=== Beauty routine ===
Ceremony for Arkbar's sons ca.1551–1602. Dancing women with Karakul/Boqta hats, Jama/Peshwaj style robes, and veils.

Women of the imperial court practiced an elaborate beauty ritual consisting of the 16 celebrated rituals. Eyebrows were arched symmetrically, Kajal applied to eyelids, the teeth were whitened with missi. Nath worn on the nose, studded with diamonds, was usually gifted to a bride by her husband. Betel leaf was used to redden the lips, sweeten breath and as deodorant. Princesses always decorated hands and feet red with mehendi, despite the great cost as it was also used as a remedy for skin irritations.

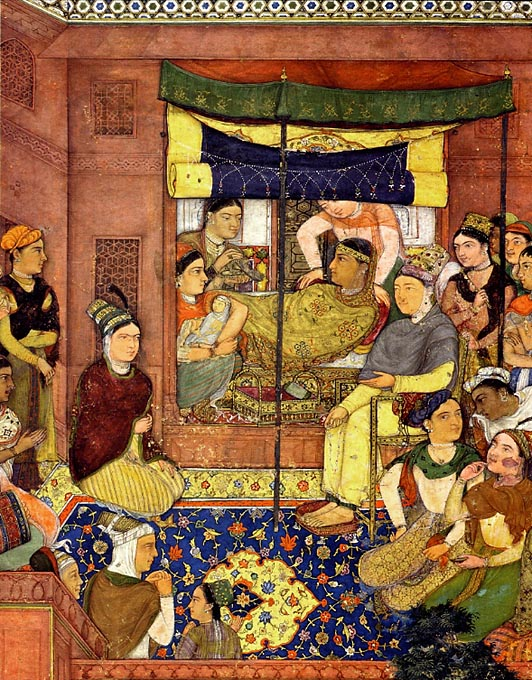
Depiction of Mariam-uz-Zamani giving birth to Jahangir

=== Jewelry ===
Jewelry-making practices flourished during the Mughal period, which is well-documented through chronicles and paintings. Mughal paintings from Akbar's reign gave the art renewed vigor, and a range of designs were developed. The Mughals contributed to almost all fields of development of jewelry. The use of jewelry was an integral part of the lifestyle, be it the king, men or women or even the king's horse. Women were known to have as many as 8 complete sets of jewelry. Popular ornaments included two-inch-wide armlets worn above the elbows, bracelets or pearls at the wrist stacked high enough to impede access to the pulse, many rings (with the mirror ring worn on the right thumb customary for nearly all the inhabitants of the Zenana), strings of pearls (as many as 15 strings at a time), metal bands or strings of pearls at the bottom of their legs, and ornaments hanging in the middle of the head in the shape of star, sun, moon, or a flower.

Turban jewelry was considered a privilege of the Emperor. The constant change in the influences from Europe can be clearly witnessed in the design of the turban jewelry. Akbar stuck to Iranian trends of the time by keeping a feather plume upright at the very front of the turban. Jahangir initiated his own softer style with the weighed down plume with a large pearl. By the time of Aurangzeb, this form became more ubiquitous. Turbans were usually heavily set with jewels and fixed firmly with a gem set kalangi or aigrette, similar in style to the Ottoman aigrette worn by the Sultan. Some of the popular head ornaments worn by men were Jigha and Sarpatti, Sarpech, Kalgi, Mukut, Turra and Kalangi. Women also adorned a variety of head ornaments such as Binduli, Kotbiladar, Sekra, Siphul, Tikka and Jhumar. In addition to these, the braid ornaments constituted an important part of women's head ornaments.

Ear ornaments were also quite popular during the Mughal times. Mughal paintings have represented earrings quite often. Ear ornaments were worn by both men and women. Mor-Bhanwar, Bali, Jhumkas, Kanphool and Pipal patra or papal patti are some of the known earrings from the period.

Neck ornaments of different kinds of pearls and precious stones were worn by men and women. Some of the neck ornaments for men included Latkan, amala necklace as well as Mala. Neck ornaments formed an important part of jewelry of women also and included Guluband, Hans, Har and Hasuli.

Nose ornaments were worn solely by women. The variety of nose ornaments worn by women during the Mughal times constituted phul, besar, laung, balu, nath and Phuli.

Mughal Jewelry
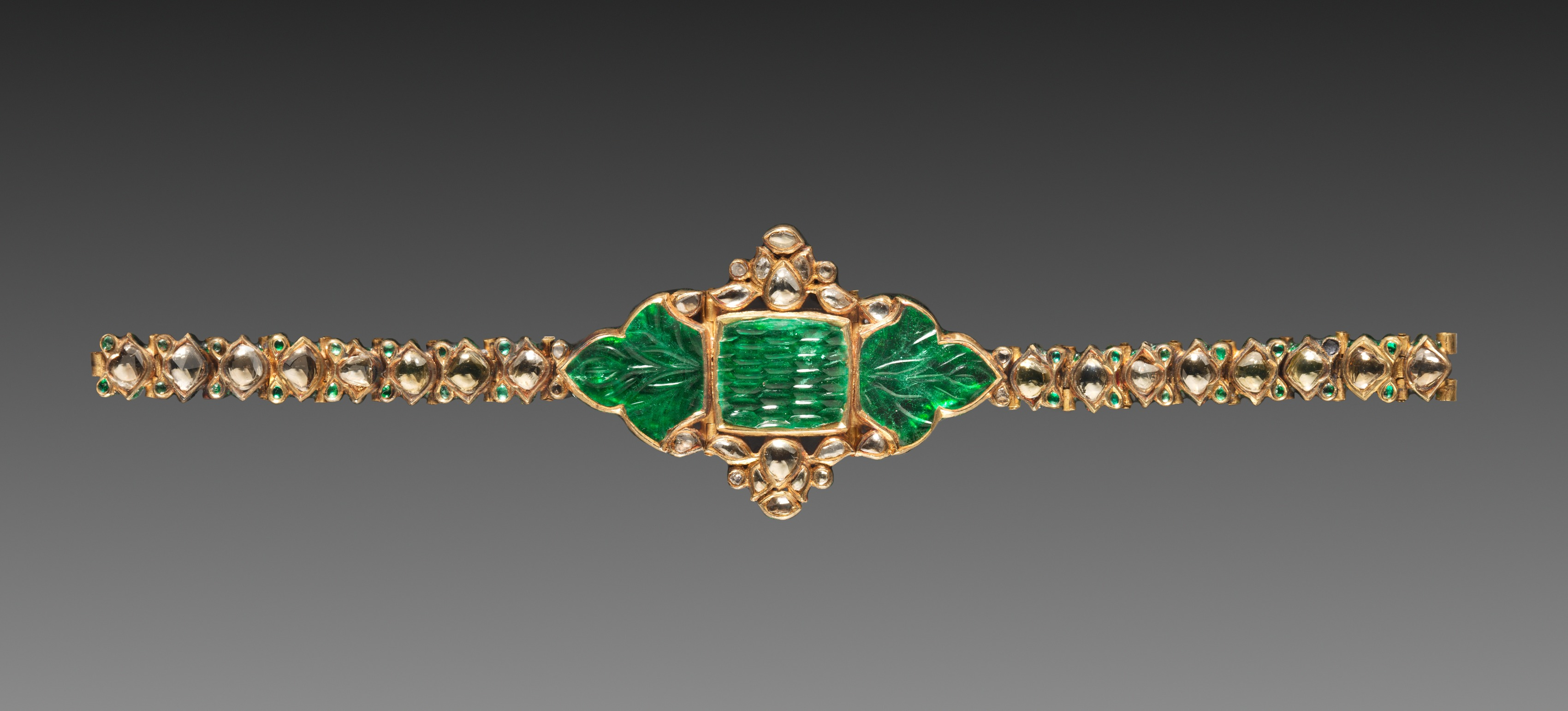
Bracelet, India, Mughal, Rajasthan, Jaipur, 18th century

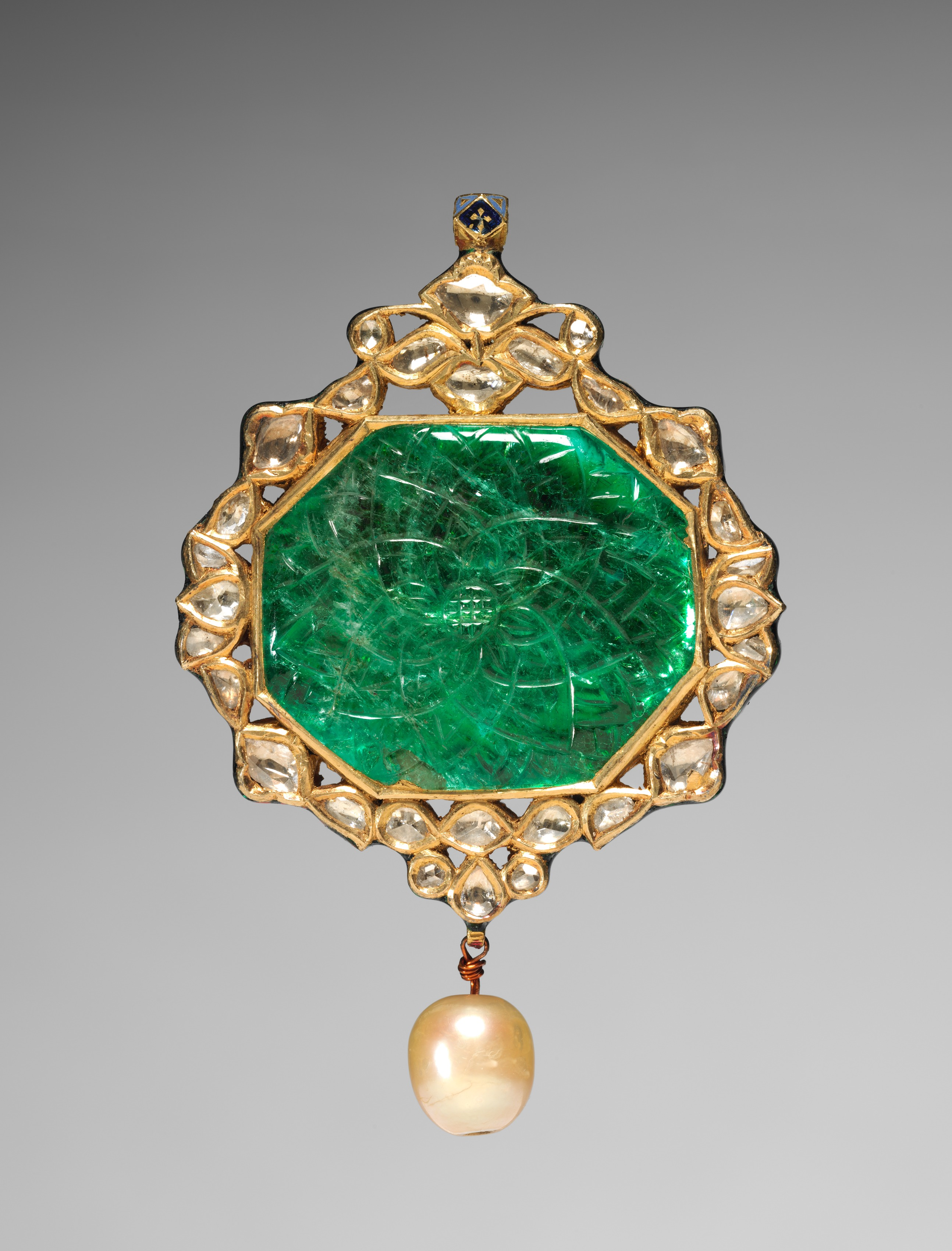
Pendant, India, Mughal, Rajasthan, Jaipur, 18th century

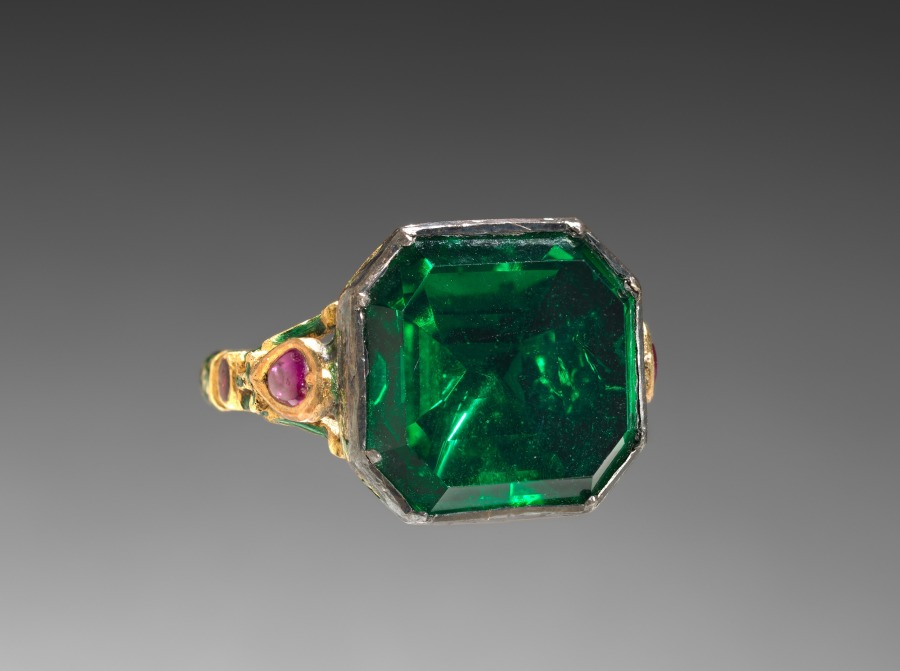
Ring, Mughal India, 18th century

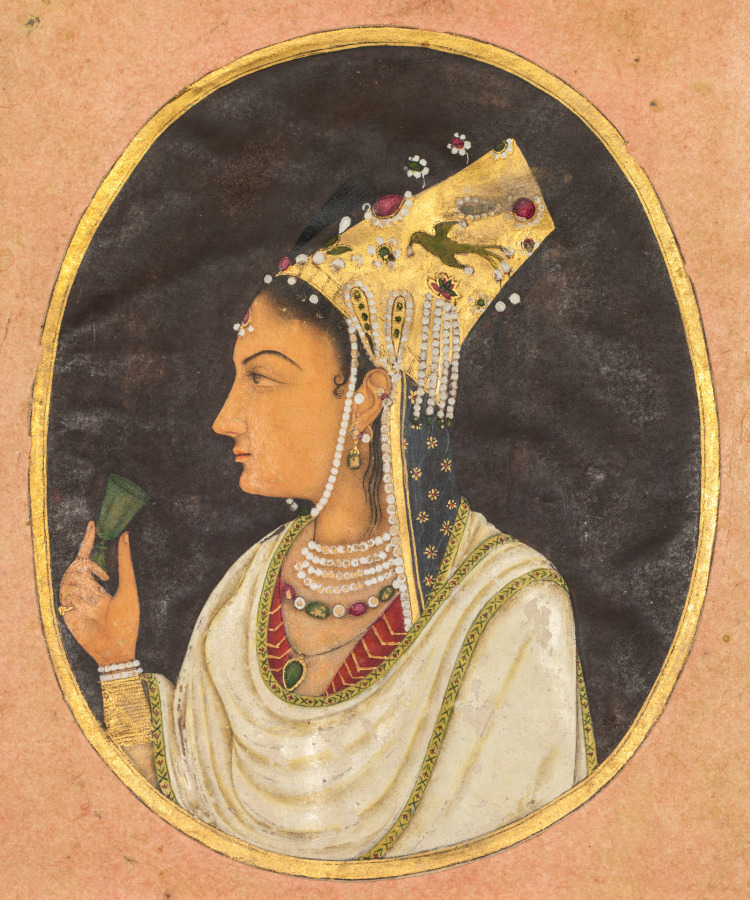
Oval portrait of a woman in a jeweled Karakul/Boqta, Mughal India, c. 1740–50

=== Dress ===
Owing to the relative isolation of the ladies in court, due to the purdah, fashion in the early days of the empire adhered to traditional dress of Khurasan and Persia. In time, the social and diplomatic relationships between the Mughal Dynasty and the rest of India (Rajputana in particular), led to more exchange in accoutrements. Noble women in the court of Babur or Humayun would have begun their outfits with wide loose pants, painted or stripped. Their upper body was covered in loose garments fastened at the neck or with V-shaped necklines. Other articles of clothing included the Yalek: a tightly fitting nearly floor-length vest, buttoned in the front, with the chest accentuated, in both short- and long-sleeve varieties.

With the addition of Rajput princesses during the reign of Akbar, Hindu clothing came to influence the court. The wives and consorts began to dress similarly, regardless of religion. Often the ladies wore multiple layers of clothing, with a tight fitting bodice that stopped short of the navel. The peshwaz, fashionable as a men's garment for a time and later adopted by the women, was added on top. The length hit the knees or lower, the waist fastened closely, and the neckline was in a "V" shape. The opening at the front of the peshwaz would have been decorated in gold. Their lower half were covered either in tight pants (tunban or izar), or in la hengu, which itself was styled like a lungi attached at the ends and a band sewn into the top. Muslim women favored the pants style, and Hindu women, the skirt. In either style, the drawstrings were decorated at length with pearls and jewels.

Only the costliest clothes of cotton, silk or wool were used. In the zenana, there were multiple costume changes a day, and often an outfit would be worn only once and then given away. The garments themselves were very thin, weighing less than an ounce each, with gold lace added and "muslin so fine as to be almost transparent." This may account for the breasts occasionally seen in Mughal miniature painting. The head was covered with gold cloths or turbans with feathers. Long gowns (qaba) or kashmiri shawl were used in cold weather. Jamawars were suits of wool with flowers interwoven with wool or silk. Patterned and bejeweled shoes, with distinctively sharp upward curling points and worn down heels were fashionable.

== Textiles ==
Fabrics of the time included wild goat's hair cloth (tus) and pashmina, and light and warm wool. Silks were often embroidered with gold and silver thread and embellished with laces. Fabrics such as silk are often thought to be the material of choice for the wealthy, but wool, cotton, and goat-hair fabrics were also highly valuable due to their sensory value (softness, warmth, etc.). In Mughal India, textiles were valued for a variety of reasons, such as for the monetary value of the materials, the sensory qualities, the metaphorical/symbolic attachments, and the socio-political associations.

Any and all of these cloths were regularly scented with rose water. Shawls were reportedly so thin they could pass through a finger ring. The various muslins had poetic names like ab-i-rawan, meaning "running water", and daft hawa, meaning "woven air". Each garment would wear out after a single use.

=== Silk ===
Silk was a highly valuable material at the time of the Mughal dynasty, however silk production was not prevalent in the Mughal territories of India. Besides the cultivation of a thicker, off-colored silk from wild silkworms in Assam, India mainly relied on imports from Iran, China, and Central Asia for silk. Emperor Akbar's invasion of Bengal and Kashmir also gave the Mughals access to the silk production in those regions.

=== Cotton ===
Malmal, or muslin, is a cotton cloth that was also highly valued all across Europe, Africa, the Middle East, and Asia. Spinners in Bengal would spin the cotton thread in early mornings or on humid afternoons as the fibers are most pliable under warm and humid conditions. Weaving the cotton to make the muslin cloth was an arduous and time-consuming task that could take up to six months for just twenty yards, making malmal equally as or even more expensive than silk. Calico is another similar cotton cloth to muslin. The two cloths could be easily mistaken, but generally calico is slightly thicker and heavier than muslin. Thin cotton cloths such as these would often be worn in hot weather. Clothing items such as jamas and dupattas could be made out of cotton textiles.

Cotton cloth was also often dyed using plants like Citrifolia root and indigo, which produced red and blue dye respectively. The process of dyeing the cloth involved submerging the cloth in the indigo solution, laying it out to drain in the air, rinsing the cloth, then washing it with diluted sulfuric acid to dissolve the residual calcium carbonate. As well as dyeing, cloth was also painted or stamped, often with floral patterns. Chintz was a type of calico fabric that was painted free hand using a bush and pencil or printed with a stamping block.

=== Artisans ===
In Mughal India, artisans were in similar economic standing to peasants. Despite artisans' skill in producing beautiful workmanship and increased patronage of the arts within the ruling class during Mughal times, the average artisan was poorly compensated for their work.

Textiles
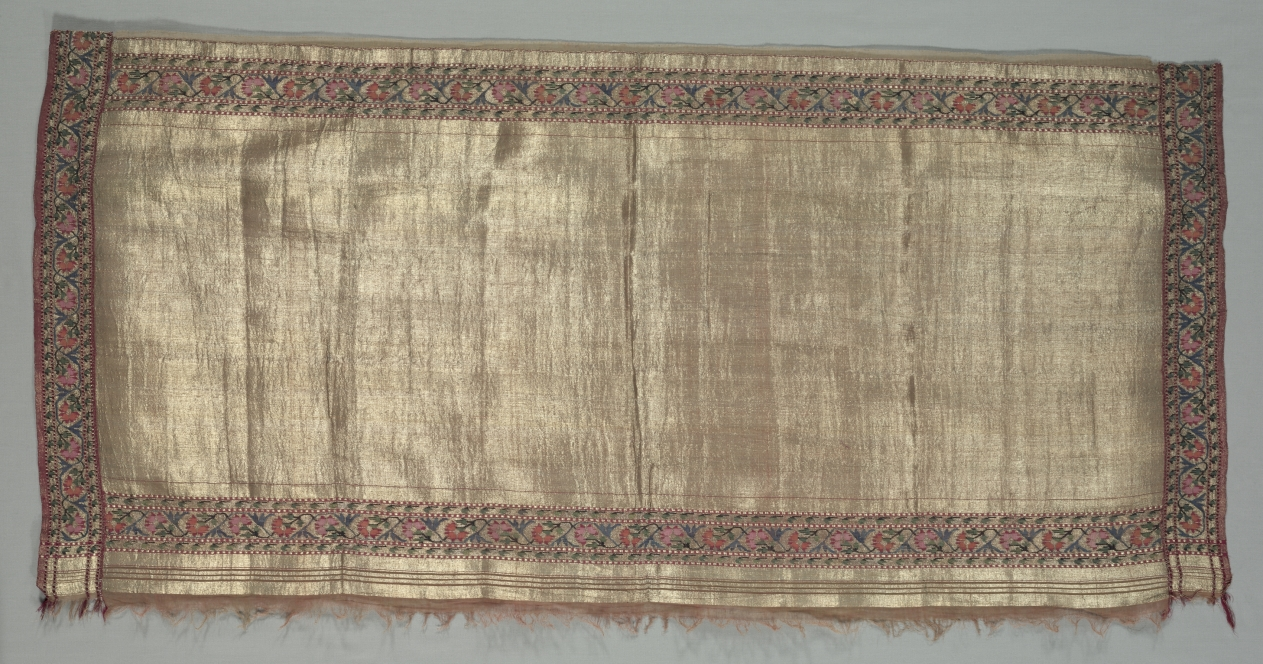
Part of a sari, silk and metal thread, 18th-19th century, Aurangabad, India

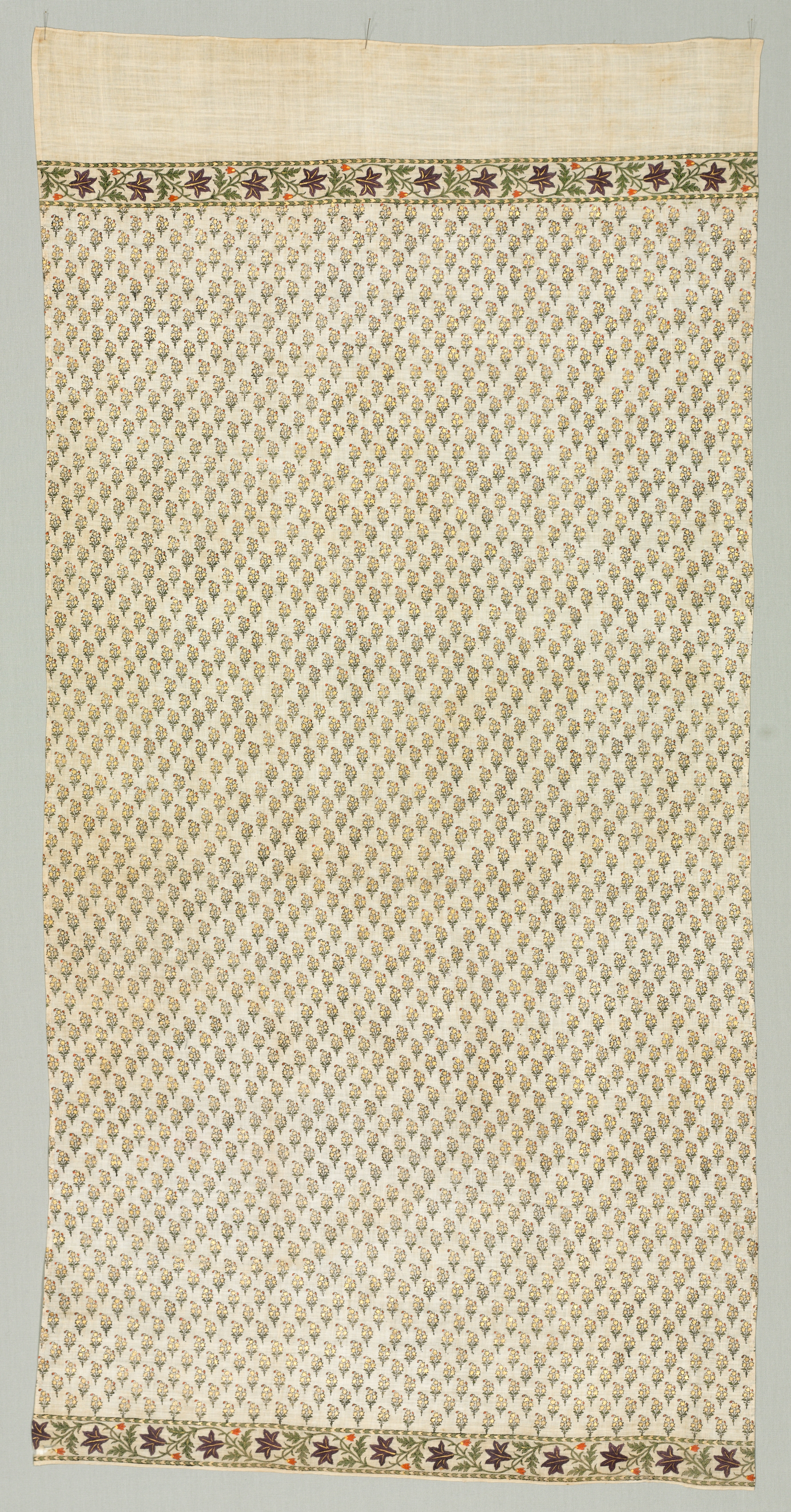
Fragment of a Turban Cloth, early 19th century, Rajasthan, India

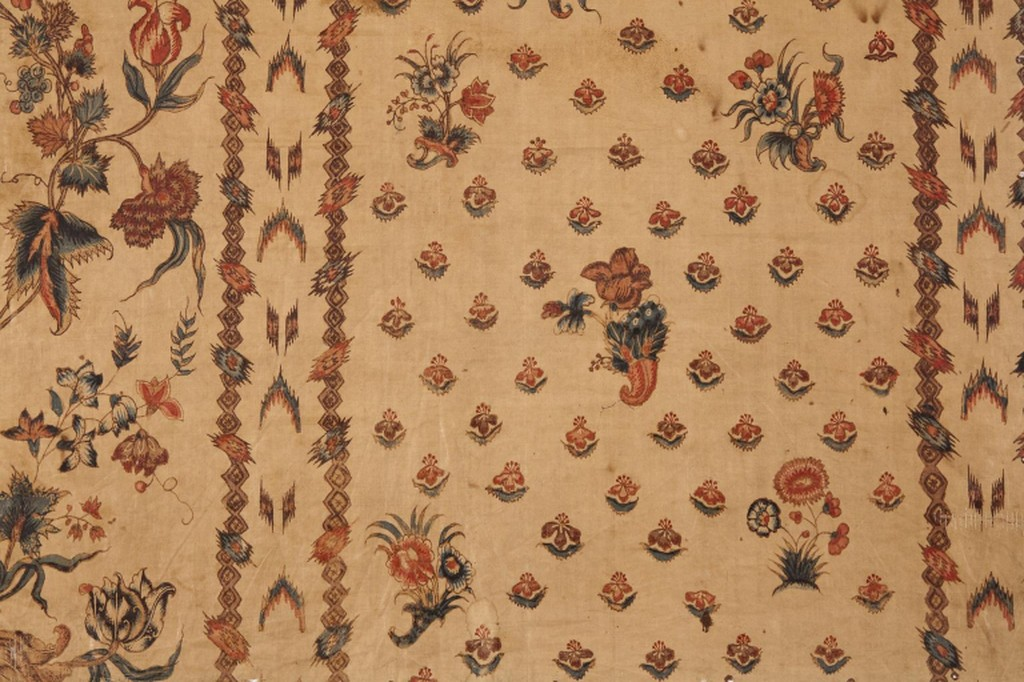
Hand painted Indian cotton fabric, chintz panel, 1700–1800, India

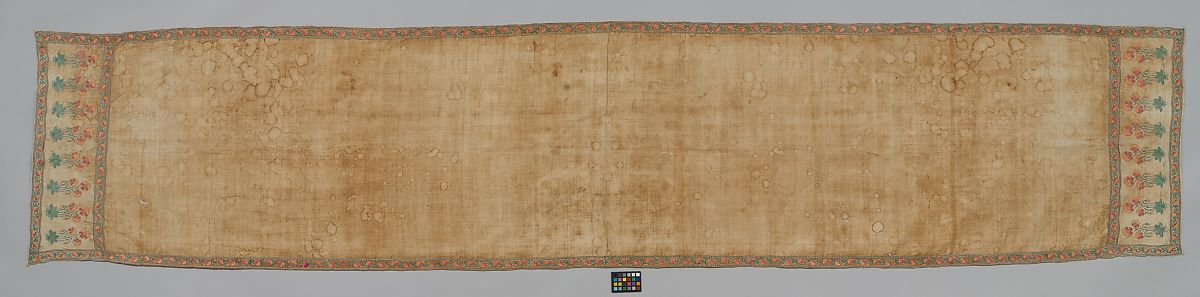
Sash (Patka) with a Floral Border, India, second half 17th century

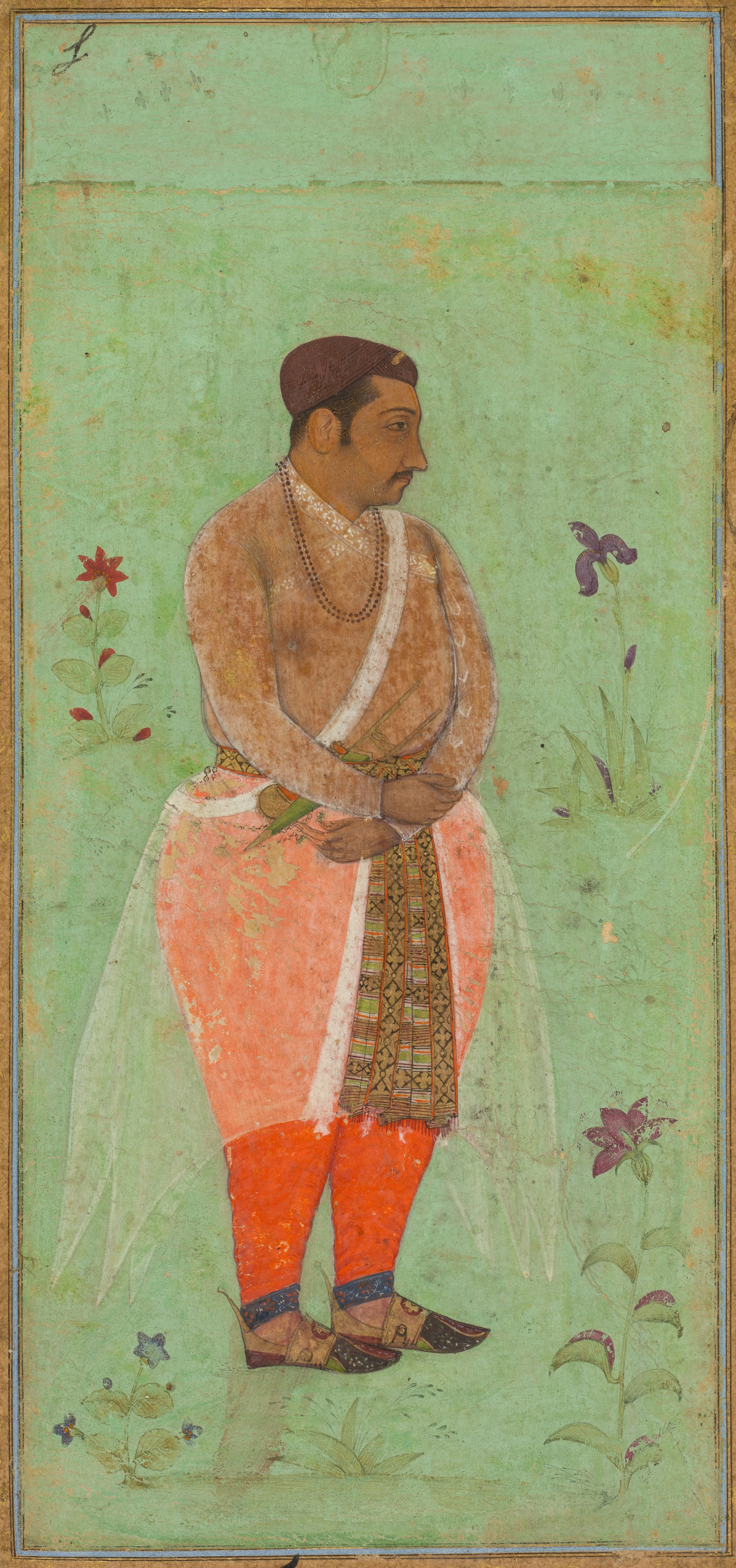
Portrait of Suraj Singh Rathor, Raja of Marwar and Maternal Uncle of Shah Jahan: A Page from the Prince Khurram Album

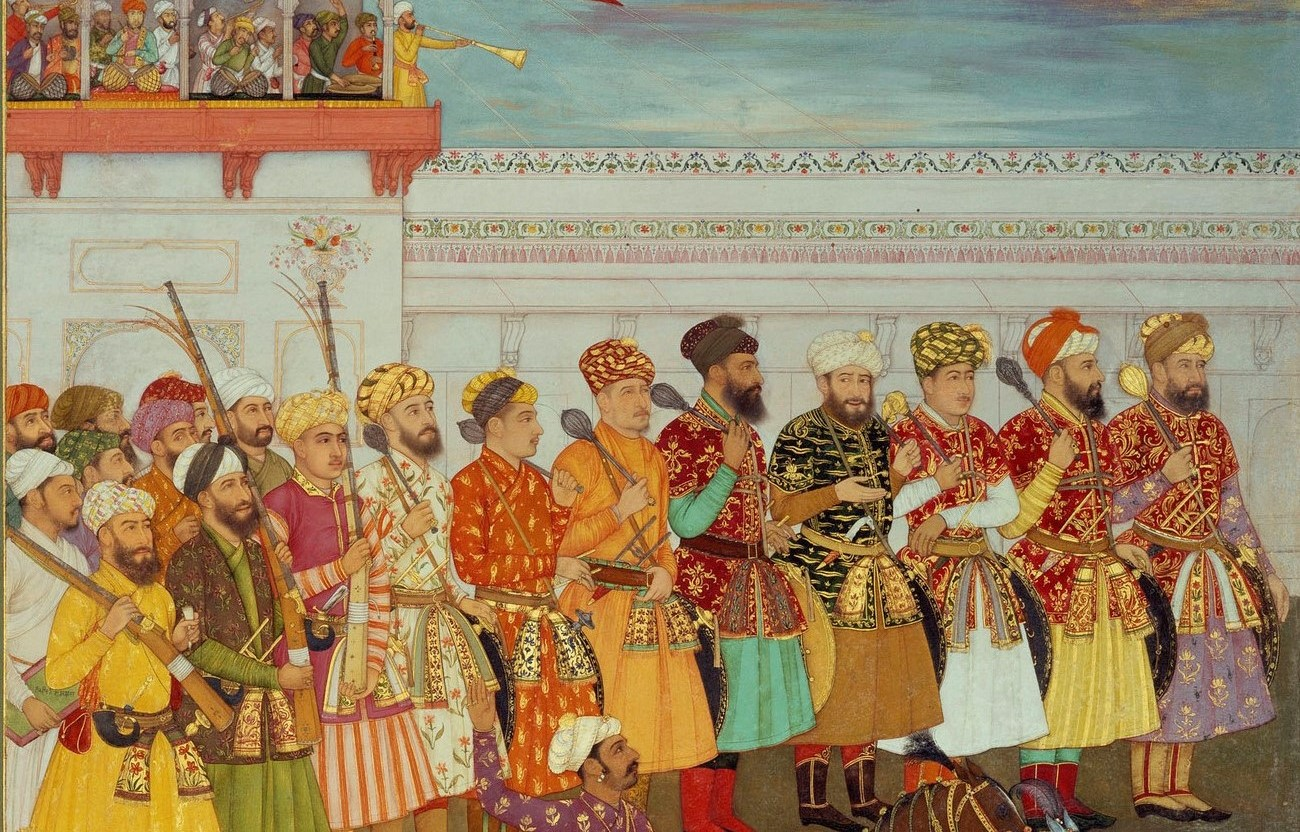
Mughal imperial court guards during the reign of Shah Jahan, 1656–1657

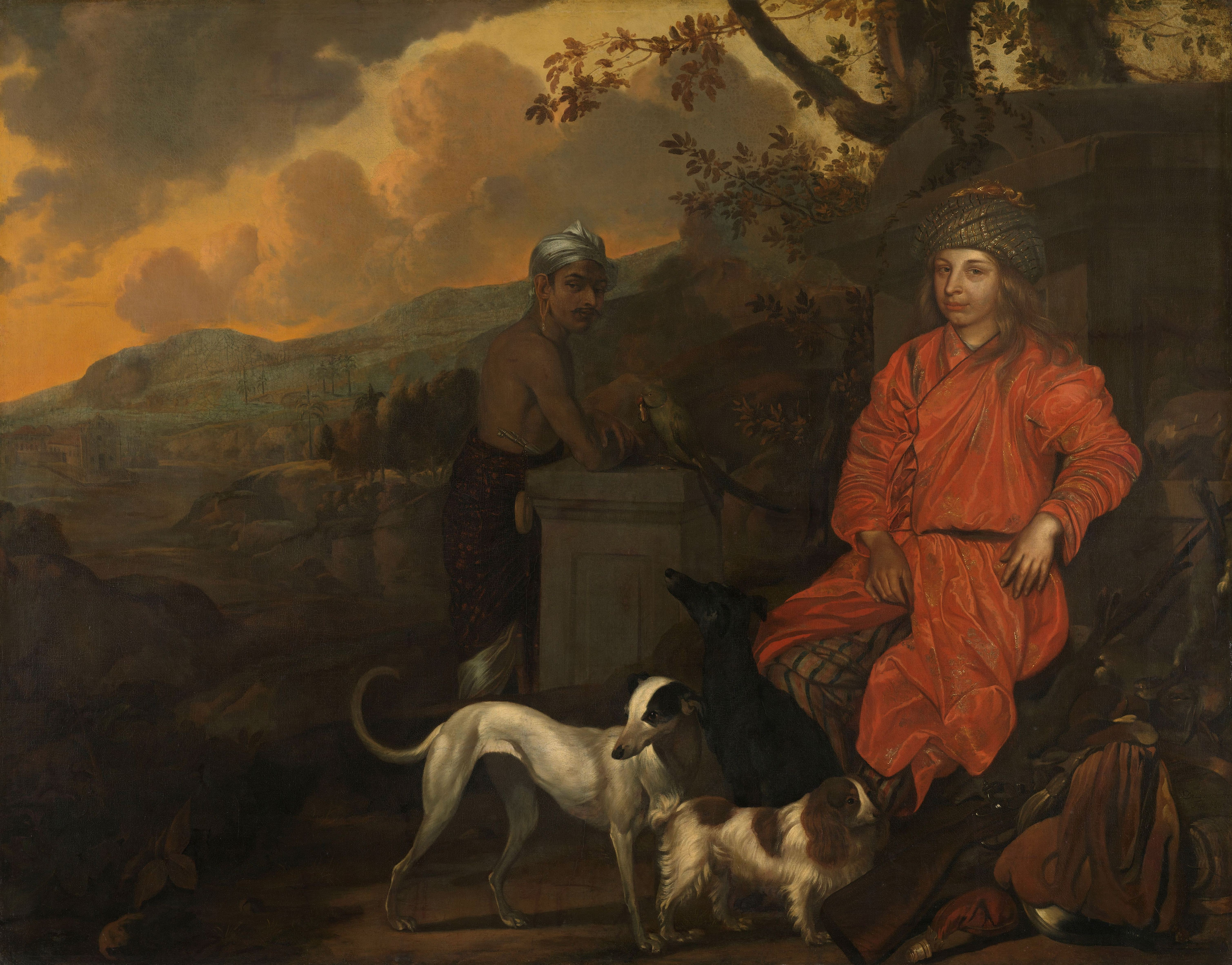
Portrait of Philip Baldaeus dressed in Mughal robes and a checkered turban, 1668

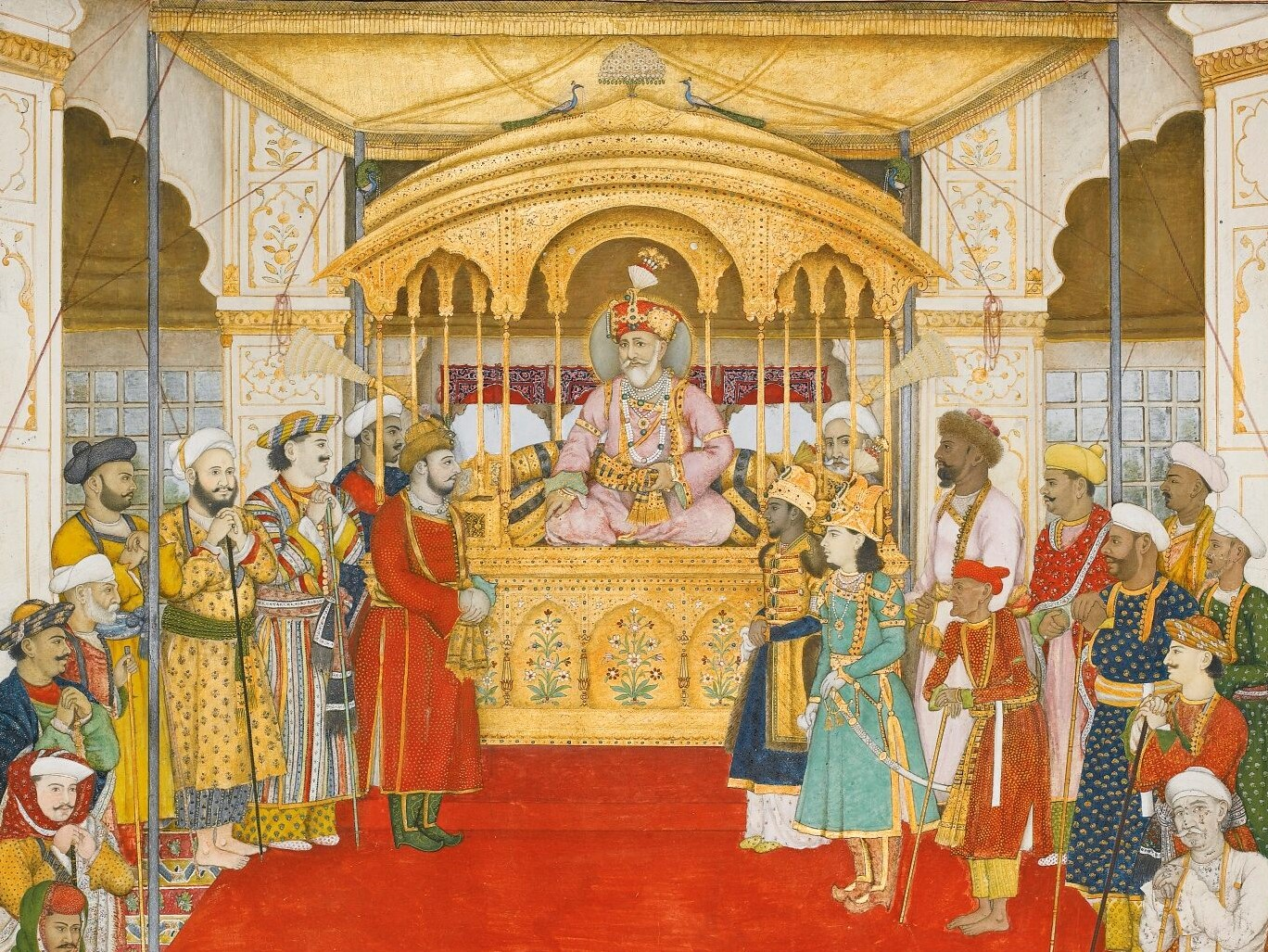
The emperor Akbar Shah II in Durbar by Ghulam Murtaza Khan Musavvir, 1810

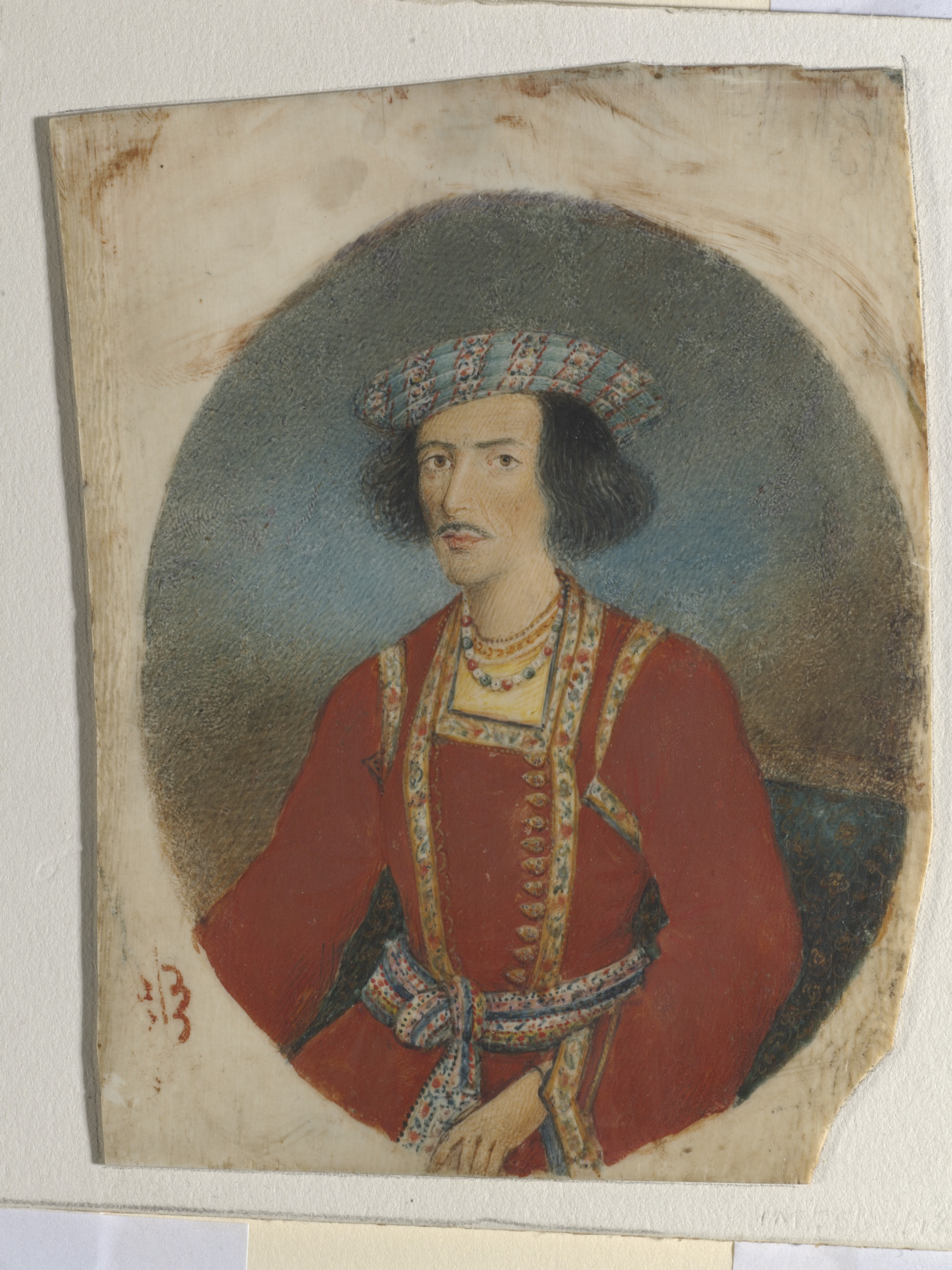
Ram Mohan Roy, a Hindu in the Mughal court, 1820

== See also ==
- Būrk
- Clothing in India
- Fūta
- Islamic clothing
- Jagulfi
- Economy of the Mughal Empire
- Muslin trade in Bengal
