= Dhilja =

Women's pajama

A dhilja was a pajama made of silk with a wide cut and straight in shape. The Dhilja was a garment of the Mughal clothing of ladies in the Indian subcontinent in the late 17th to early 19th centuries.

== See also ==
- Peshwaj
- Katzeb
