= Jagulfi =

Kind of gown

Jagulfi was a ladies' garment of the Mughal period. It was a long ankle-length gown with a flowing skirt, fastened at neck and waist has long tight, gathered sleeves. There was an opening in between the fastened area allowing a glimpse of the bosoms. Rajput ladies also used similar royal gowns with minor alterations like a slit in the open and a petticoat below the outer garment.

== See also ==
- Mughal clothing
