= Gharara =

Traditional outfit of the Indian subcontinent similar to a flared skirt

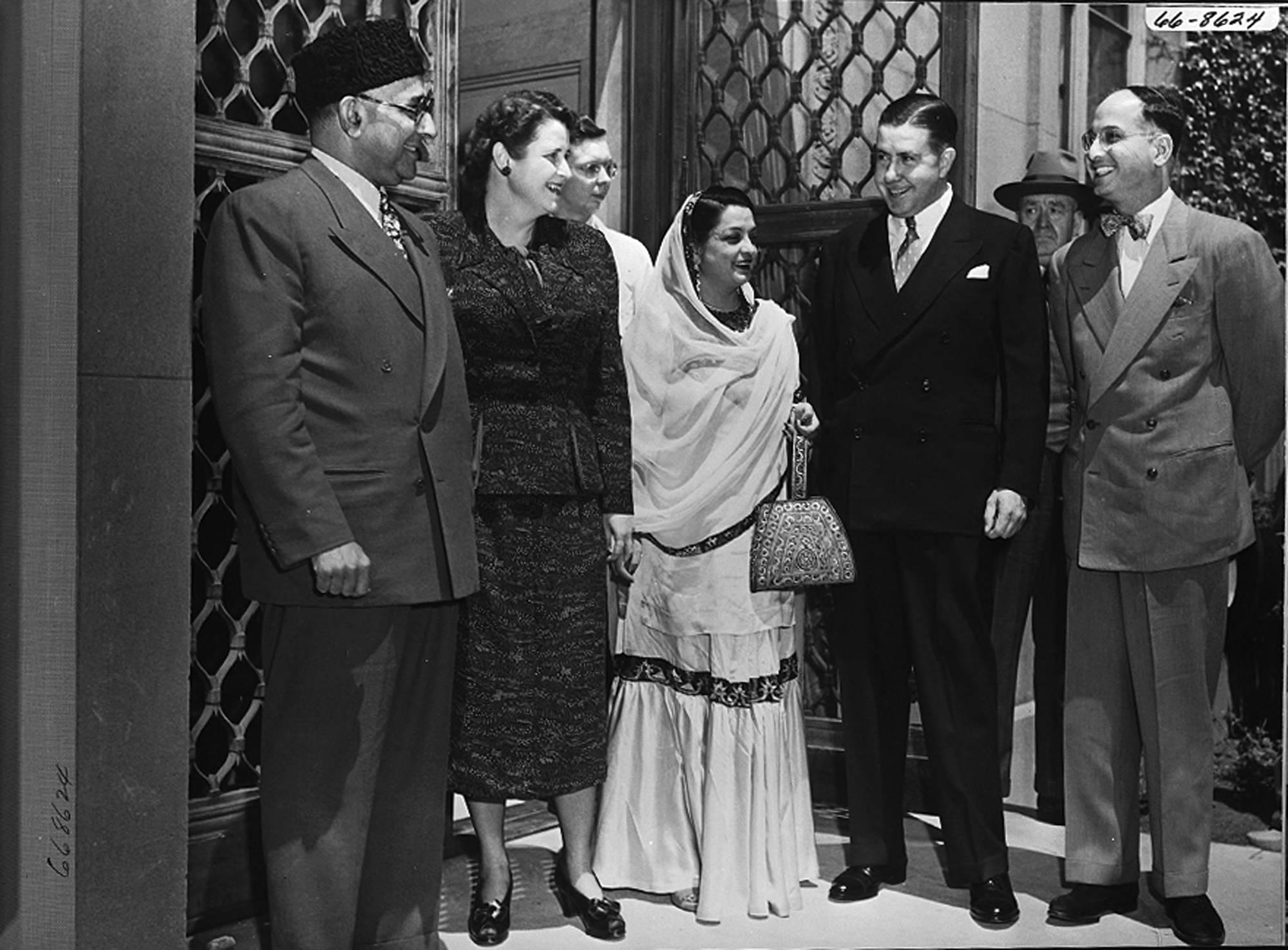
Begum Liaquat Ali (centre), dressed in a gharara, 1950

A gharara is a traditional Lucknowi outfit, traditionally worn by Muslim women of the Hindi-Urdu Belt region of India. It consists of a kurti (a short, mid-thigh length tunic), a dupatta (veil), and most importantly, a pair of wide-legged pants, ruched at the knee so they flare out dramatically known as Gharara. The knee area, called the gota in Hindi-Urdu, is often elaborately embroidered in zari and zardozi work. Each leg of a traditional gharara is made from over 12 metres of fabric, often silk brocade.

Ghararas originated in Awadh region of Uttar Pradesh during the era of the Nawabs. During the late 19th and early 20th centuries, the gharara was part of the everyday attire among Muslim women of the Hindi-Urdu Belt. Ghararas were also made popular in Pakistan and Bangladesh in the 1950s and 1960s, with popular public figures like Fatima Jinnah and Begum Rana Liaquat Ali Khan wearing them.

Although they are no longer worn as an everyday garment, they remain popular as wedding attire among Muslim women of the Hindi-Urdu Belt and also among Urdu-speaking immigrants in Pakistan and Bangladesh.

== Images ==
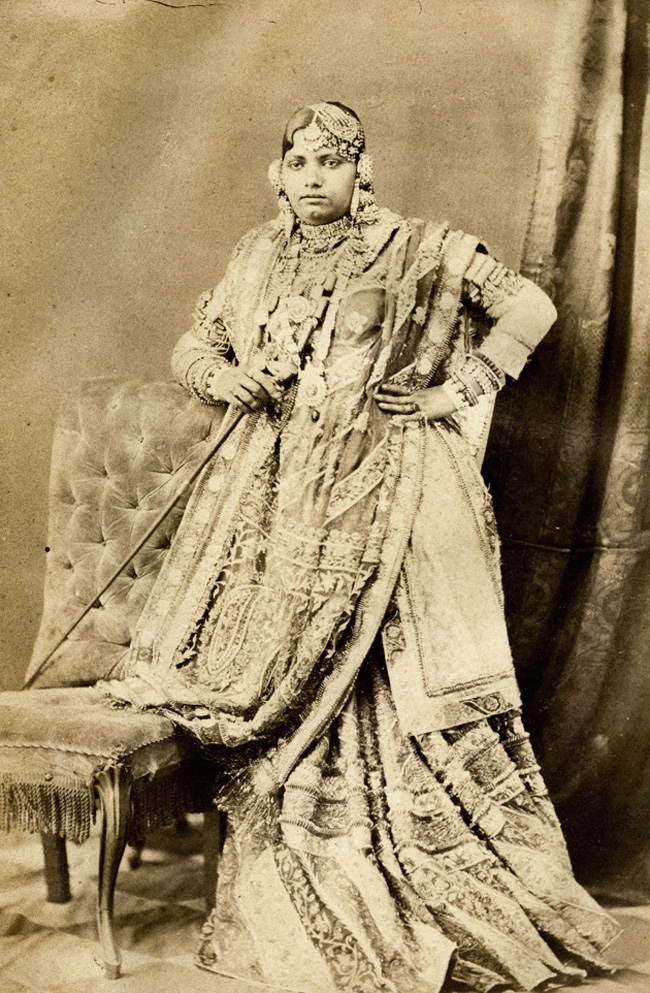
Lucknow women in Gharara

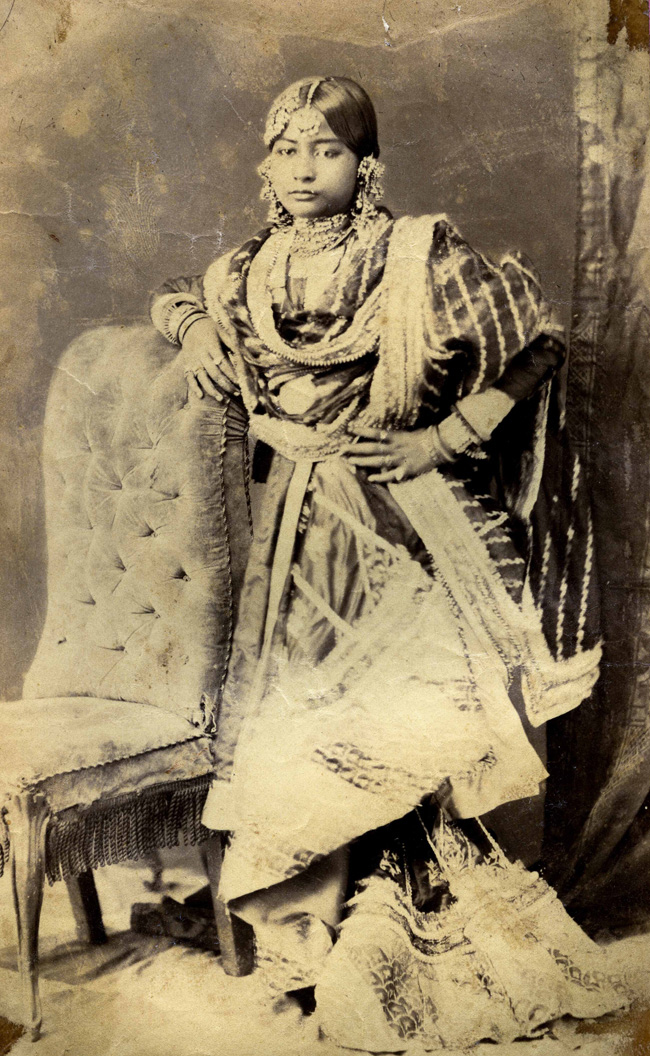
Lucknow Women in Gharara

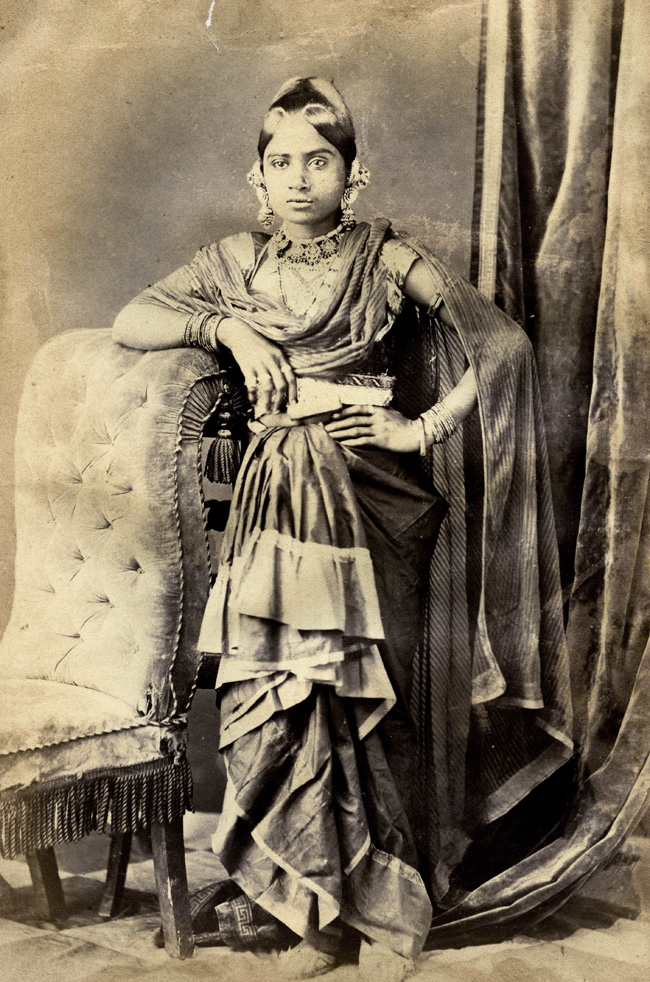
Women in Gharara

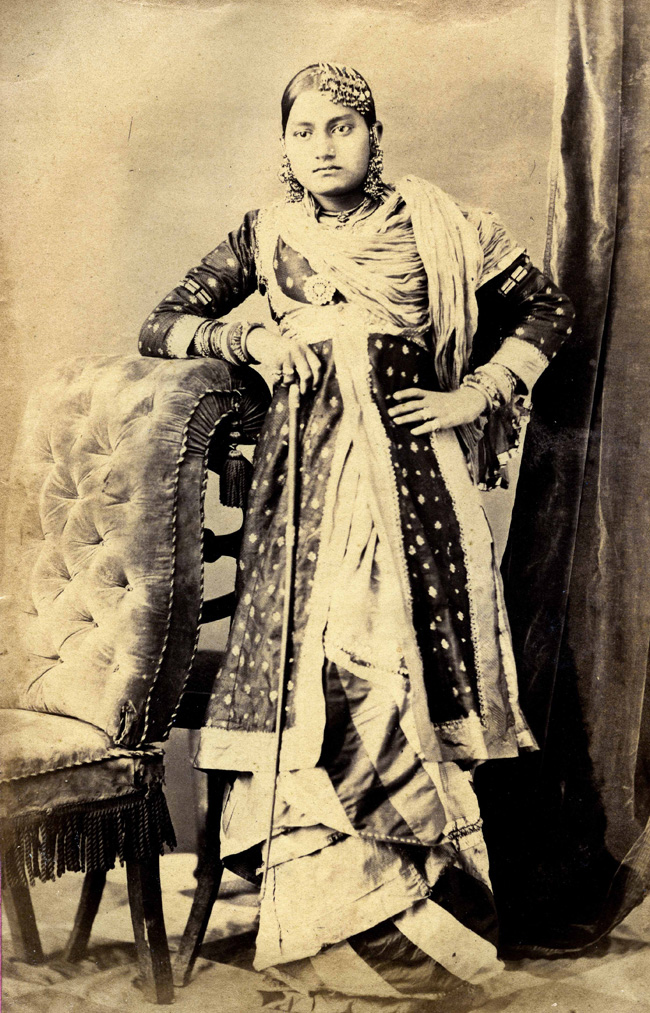
Women in Gharara

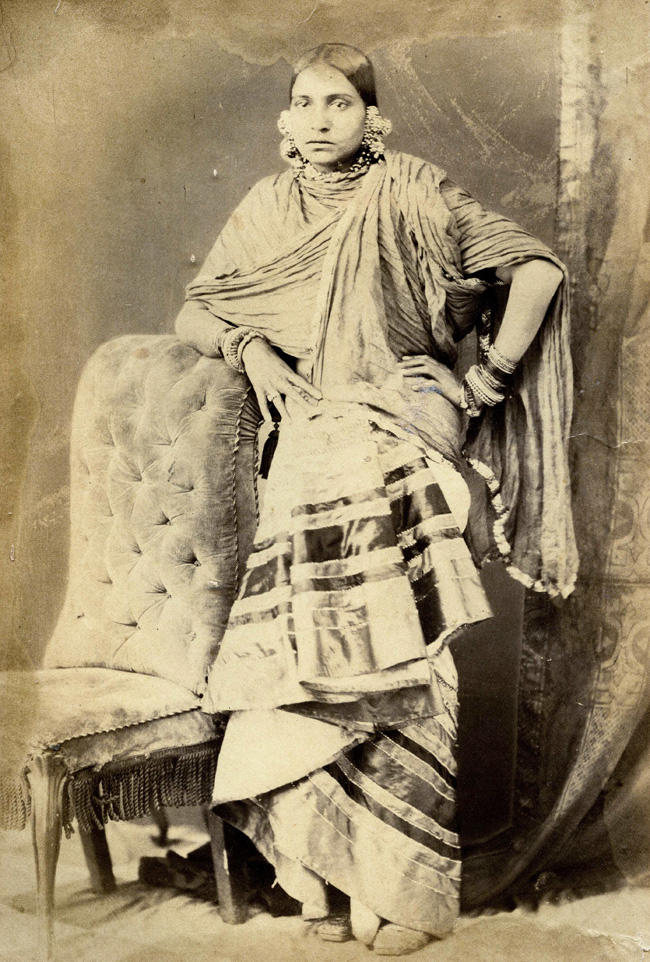
Women in Gharara

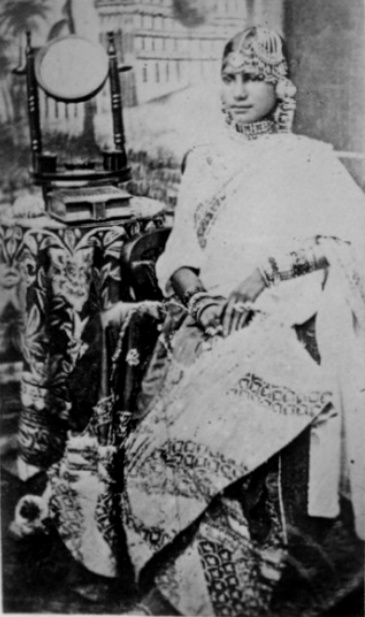
Girl in Gharara

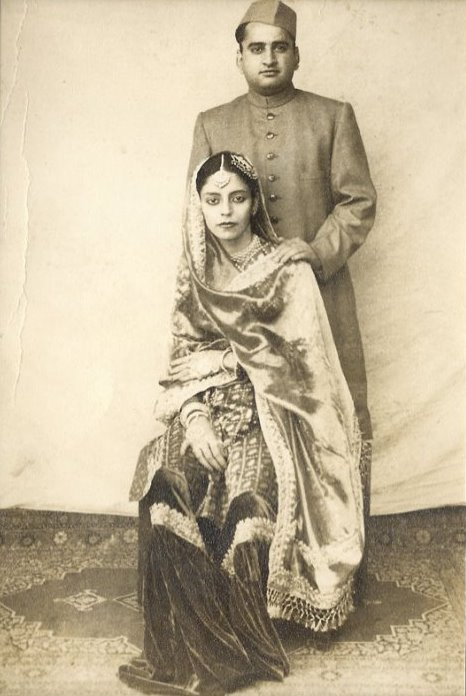
Lucknow wedding

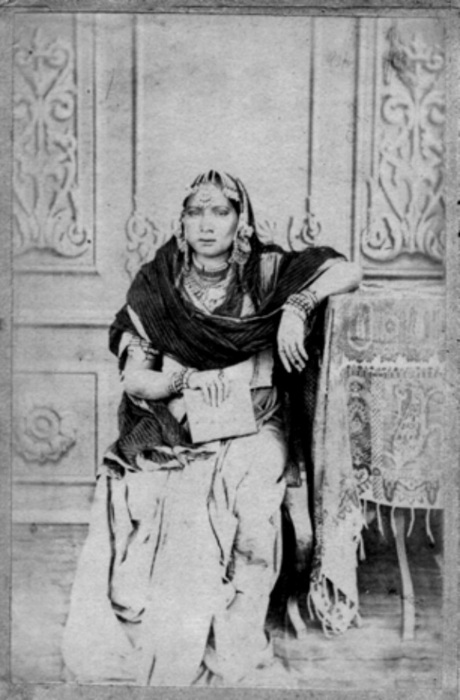
Women in Gharara

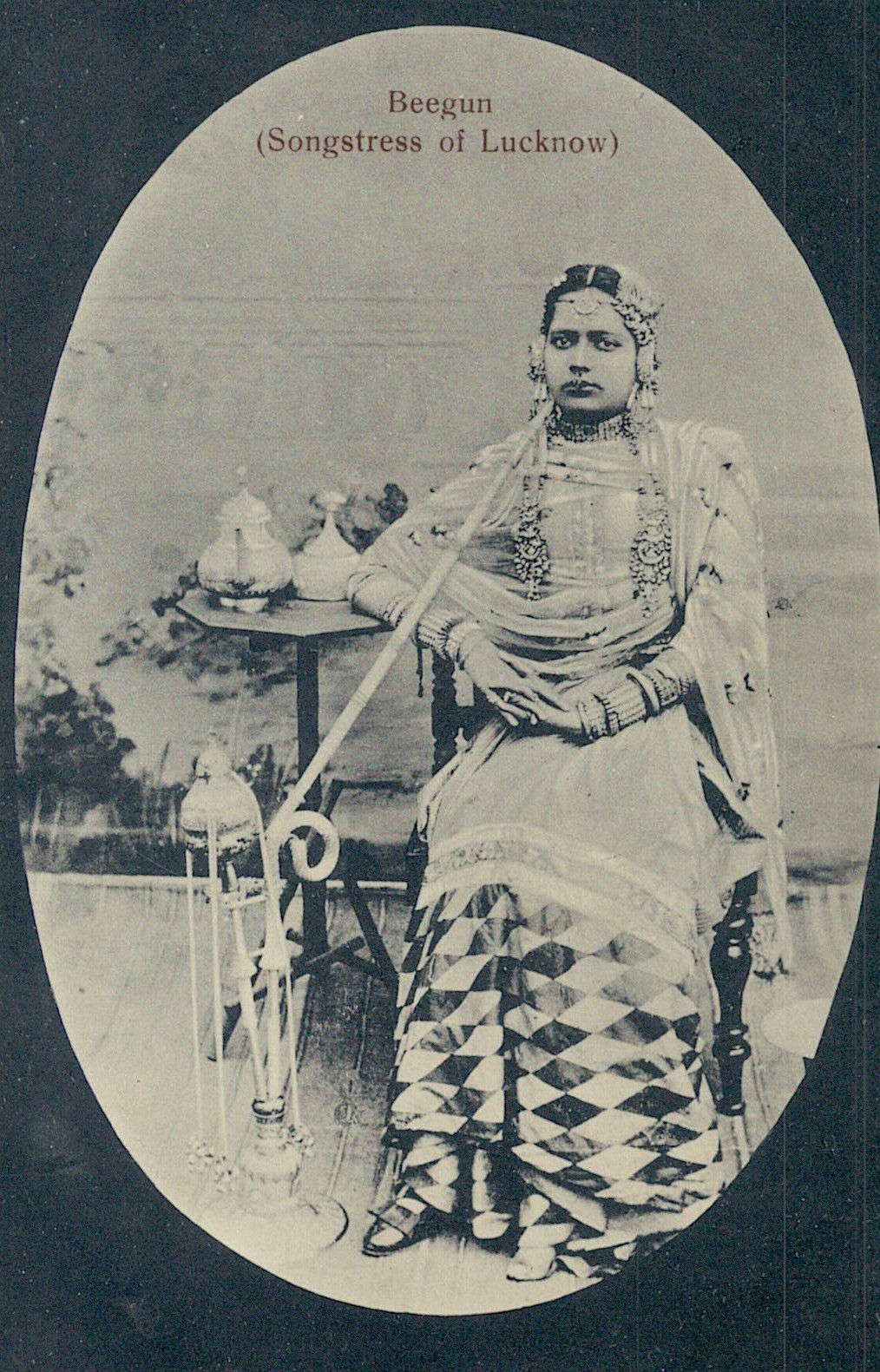
Lucknow singer in Gharara

== See also ==
- Farshi Pajama
- Lucknow
- Awadh
