= Gugu hat =

Historical Mongol hat

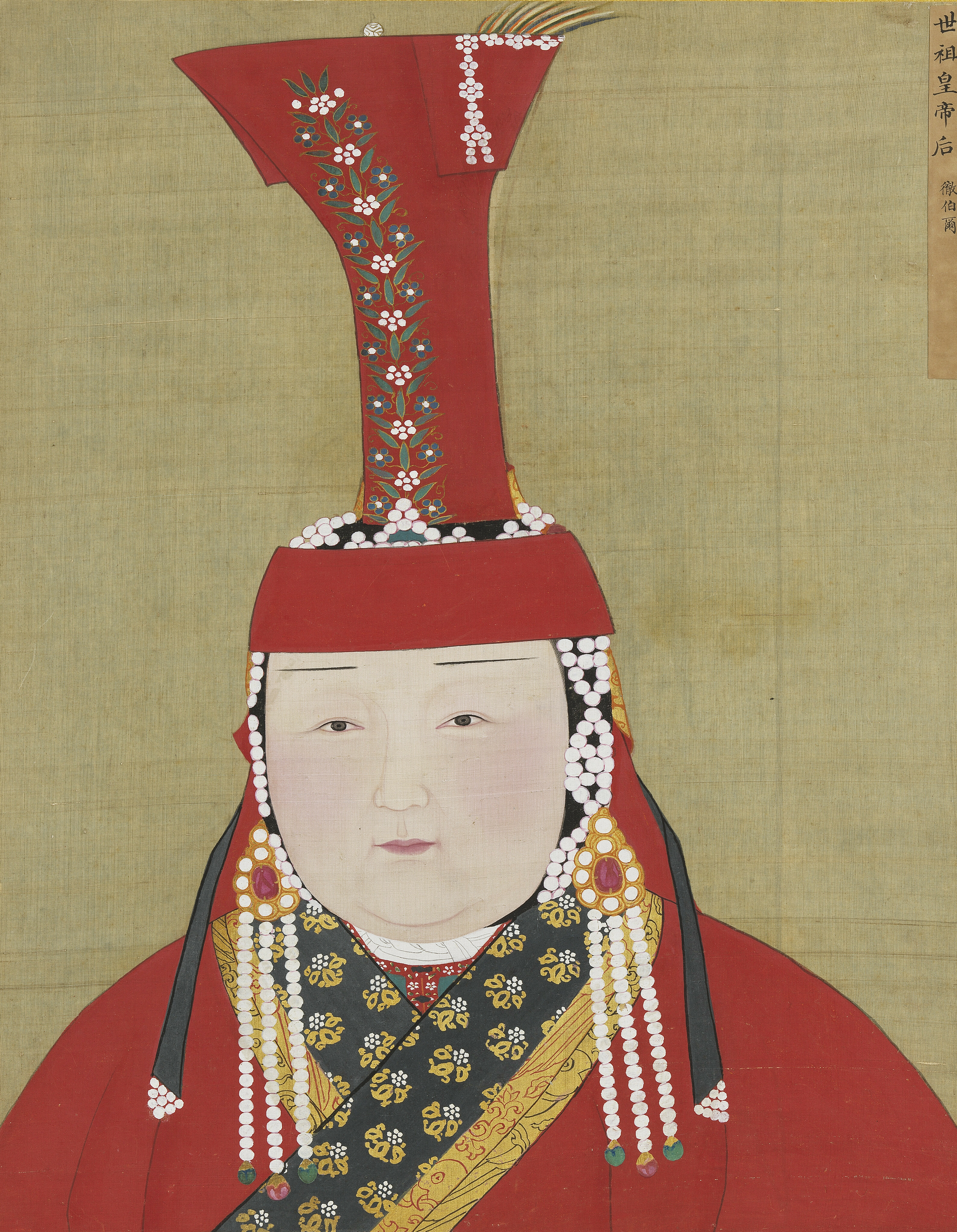
Empress Chabi wearing a gugu hat

Gugu hat (罟罟冠 or 固姑冠 or 顧姑冠 or 故姑冠; pronounced as Guguguan in Chinese) is a tall headdress worn by Mongol noblewomen before and during the Yuan dynasty. It is also known as boqta, boghta, botta, boghtagh or boqtaq. It was introduced to the Mongol court by Empress Chabi during the 1270s. The gugu hat was one of the hallmark headdress of Mongol women in the 13th and 14th century. It was always worn with the formal robe of Mongol women.

The boqta also appeared in the Ilkhanate (1256–1335 AD), in Korea when Mongol princesses married in the Goryeo court, and continued to be used in the Timurid court in the 15th century AD.

== Terminology ==
Gugu was a Mongolian word for hat; its name was then translated into Chinese based on its pronunciation.

== Construction and design ==
The Gugu hat was made with wires made of iron and with bamboo strips; they were shaped in the form of a large flask. It had the shape of long cylindrical shaft which became more spread out at the top. It could be as tall as one foot high. It could be covered with silk or felt fabric. It could be made of red silk or brocade, blue-green brocade, black felt. It could also be decorated with precious stones, such as pearls, gold filigrees, large pieces of jewelries in the middle of the hat, and small tuft of quills such as peacock feathers.

== Influences and derivatives ==
It was claimed that boqtaq hat influenced the 15th century AD conical hats (i.e. hennin) worn by European women, although this has been debunked. The Korean jokduri might have originated from the gugu hat.

== Gallery ==
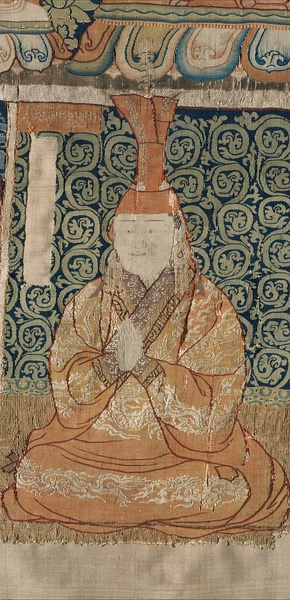
Empress Budashiri of Yuan and Khatun of the Mongols.

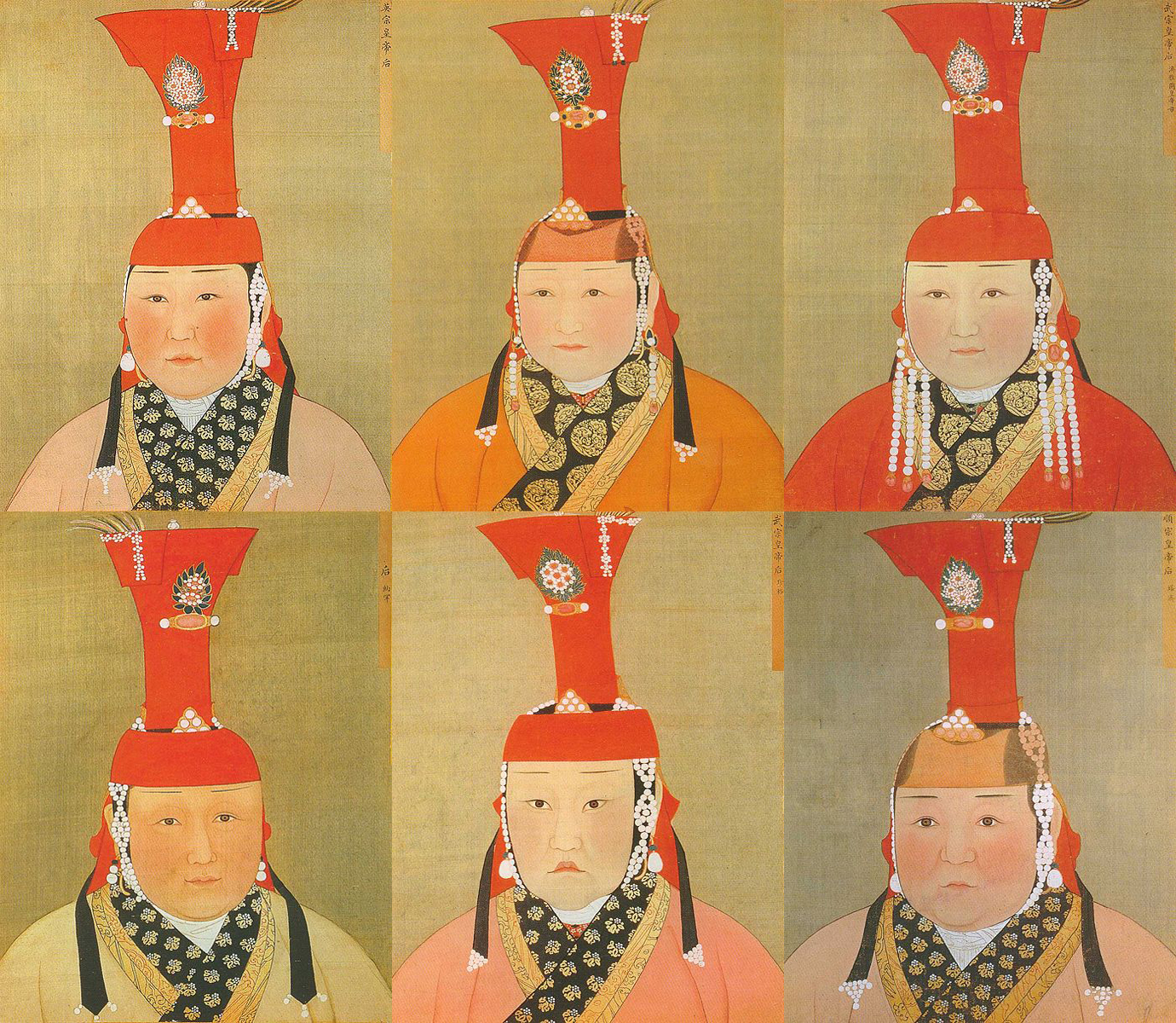
Yuan dynasty empresses wearing gugu hat.

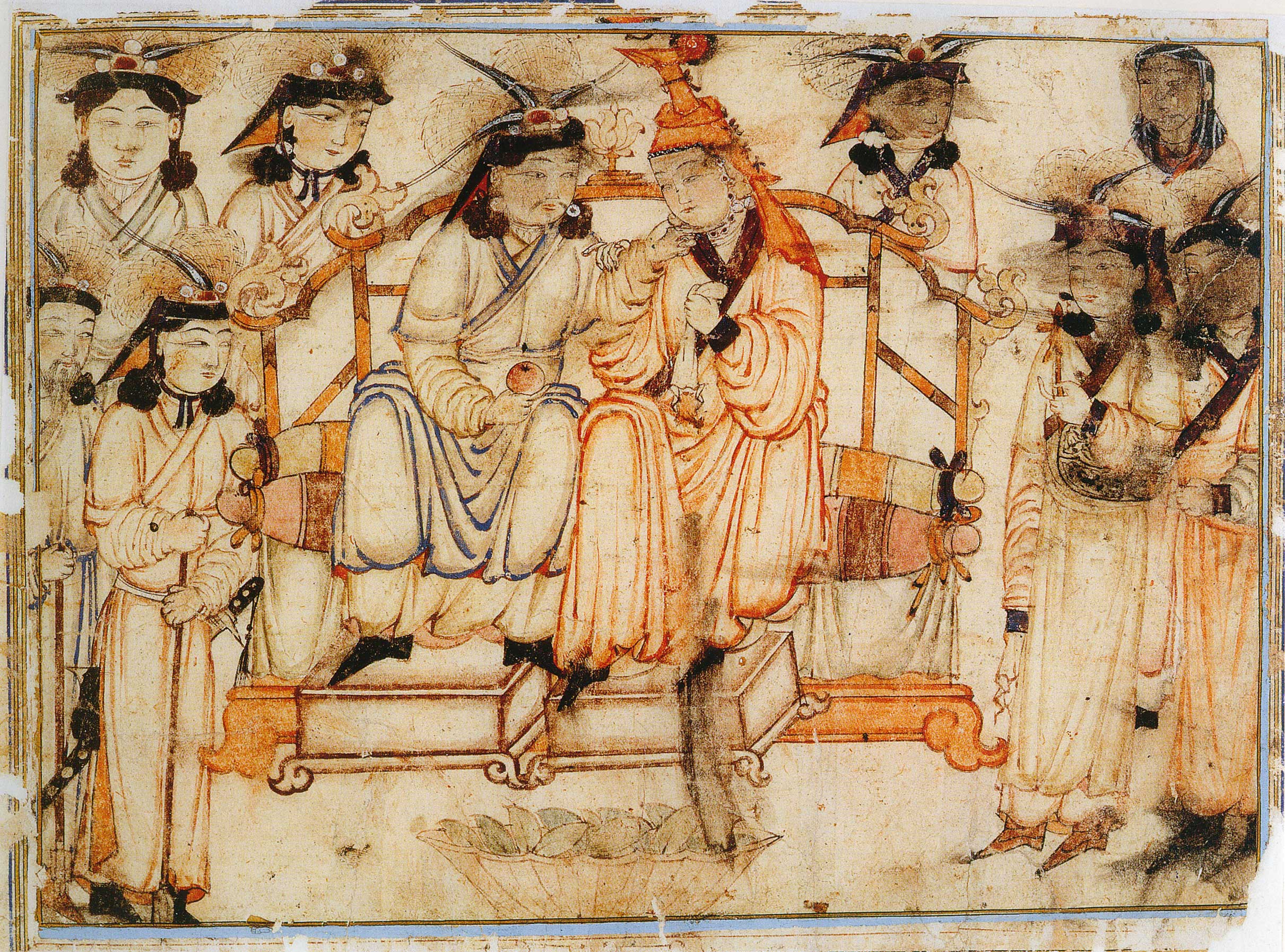
Khatun wearing a boqta. Illustration of Rashid-ad-Din's Gami' at-tawarih, 1st quarter of 14th century AD.

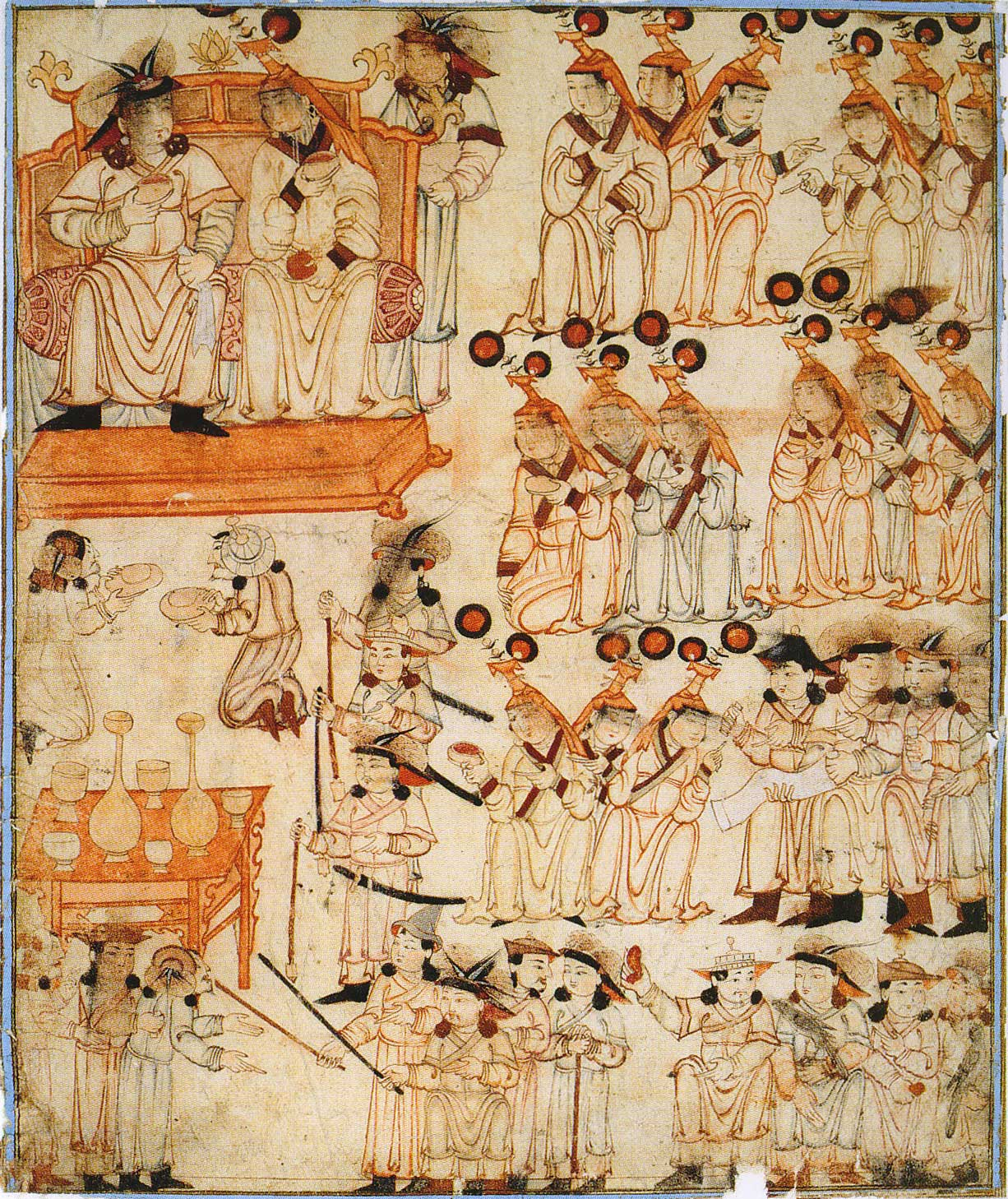
Women wearing boqta, Illustration of Rashid-ad-Din's Gami' at-tawarih, 1st quarter of 14th century AD.

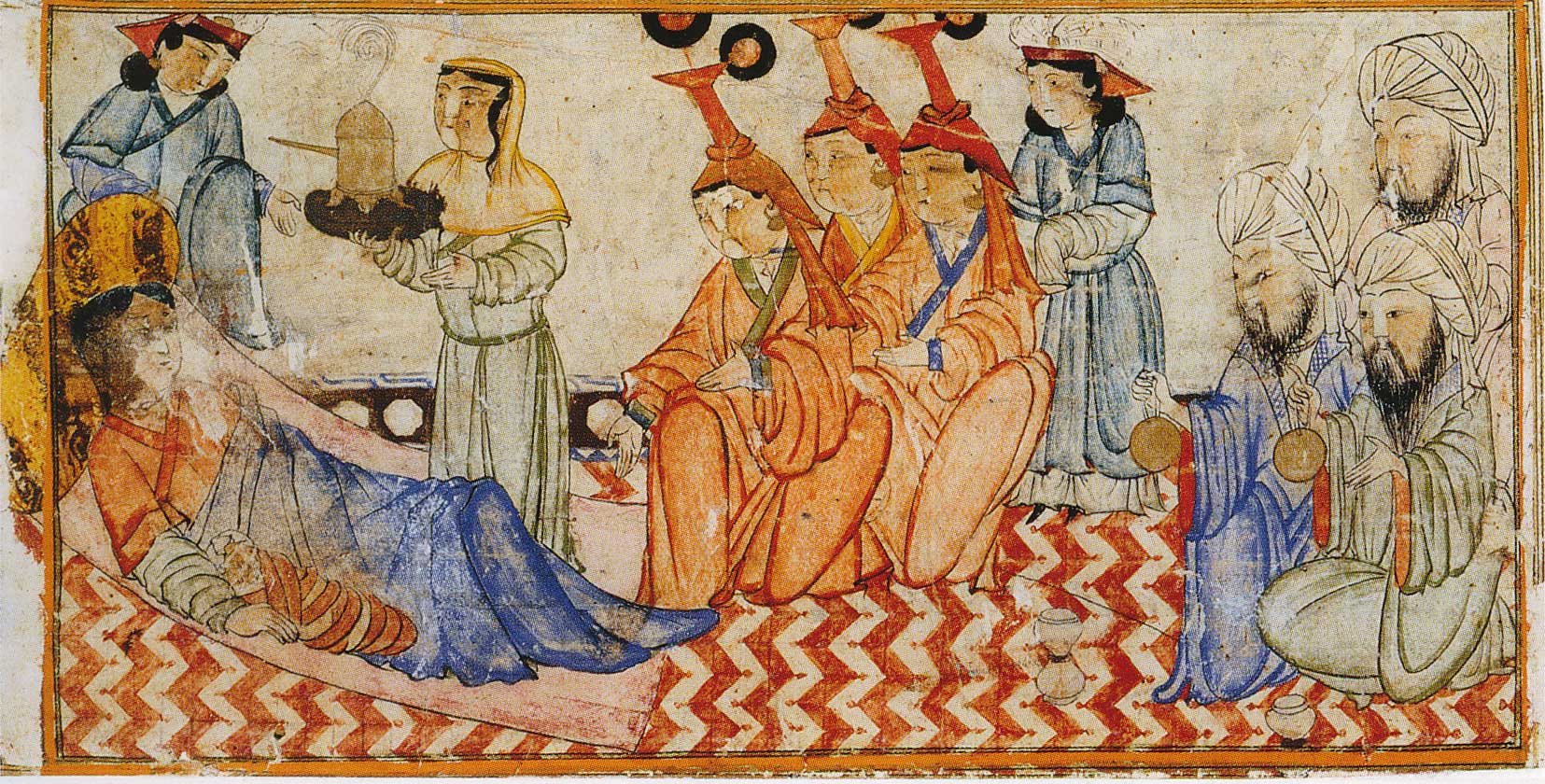
Three women wearing boqta, Illustration of Rashid-ad-Din's Gami' at-tawarih, 1st quarter of 14th century AD.

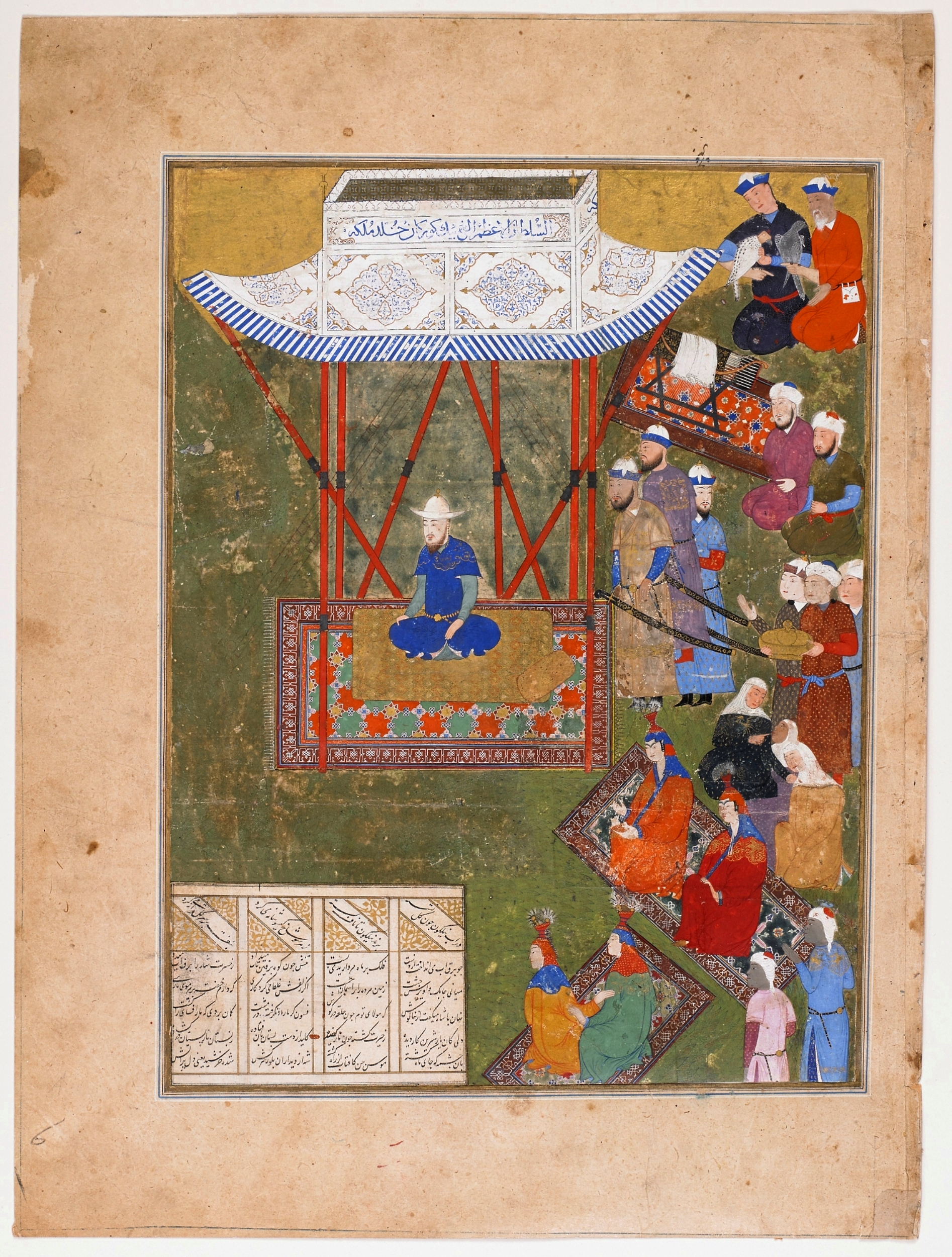
Harem ladies of Ulugh Beg, Timurid court 1425-1450 AD.

== See also ==
- Hennin
