= Farshi pajama =

Woman's dress

A rough illustration of a farshi pajama. One woman is wearing a farshi pajama while it is spread out; another wearing a farshi pajama is holding it up while walking.

Farshi pajama is an Indian woman's dress that was worn between early 20th centuries in the courts of Oudh by royalty and ladies from privileged classes of Uttar Pradesh (formerly United Provinces of Agra and Oudh in North India). Modeled after the flowing gowns worn by British noblewomen, the complete outfit consists of three basic parts – the kurta or a long shirt, the dupatta or the long stole (an essential piece in traditional Indian wear covering the head and chest), and the third and most important, the farshi pajama, which is a flowing two-legged skirt held by drawstrings. It falls straight to the ankles from where it starts flaring flowing copiously onto the floor. The farshi pajama in this era is often called farshi gharara, a term not used before the mid-20th century.

The word 'farshi' literally means 'of the floor'; combined with the word 'pajama', the term evolves to mean a bottom-wear garment that falls generously on the floor and trails as one walks. In reality, when walking, an expert wearer holds the dress by carefully pulling up and folding the excess flaring trail and holding it in her left hand, keeping the right one free. The large quantity (historically, 9–15 yards) of expensive cloth, embroidered using the art of goldwork and sterling silver wire threads (referred to as karchob, zari or zardozi depending on specific style), used to make a farshi pajama mainly reflects the grandeur and extravagance of the nobles and rulers of that era.

Different eras brought changes to the fashion and cuts of the dress. These variations were also dependent from one princely state's court to another. Modified, smaller-length versions are still, but rarely, worn by women in weddings in India and Pakistan to recreate bygone elegance.

In media, movies such as Umrao Jaan (1981) and Shatranj Ke Khilari (1977) that depict Indian Muslim culture of 19th-century Lucknow show noblewomen and royal courtesans wearing farshi pajamas.
