= Būrk =

Tall felt cap of the Mughals

Būrk (Mongolian: Bürkh Malghai/Бүрх малгай) was a black lambskin cap associated with the Mughal period, mentioned in Baburnama.

== See also ==
Mughal emperors
