= Yalek =

Lingerie

Yalek was an underslip, a ladies garment older than 500 years of the Indian subcontinent. Yalek was a long vest type undergarment, sticking to the body, and the length was down to ankles. The ladies wore Yalek underneath the gowns and other costumes. Both Hindus and the Muslim ladies wore similar dresses except few changes.

== See also ==
Shaluka
