= Breastfeeding =

Feeding of infants with breast milk

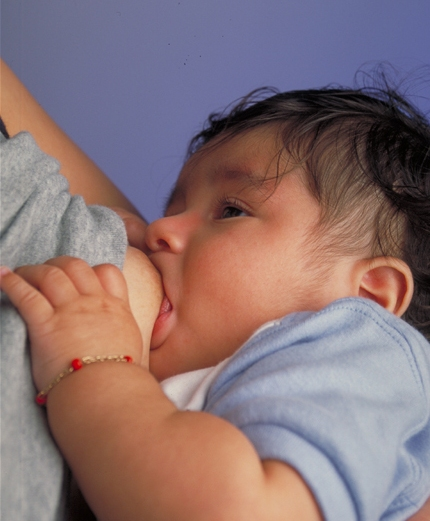
An infant being breastfed

Video summary of article with script

Breastfeeding (or nursing) is the feeding of breast milk to an infant. Infants may suckle directly from the breast, or milk may be extracted with a breast pump and then fed to the infant. The World Health Organization (WHO) recommends that breastfeeding begin within the first hour of a newborn's birth and continue as the baby wants. Health organizations including the WHO recommend exclusively breastfeeding for six months; this means that no other foods or drinks—other than vitamin D supplement—are typically given. The WHO recommends then continuing breastfeeding with appropriate complementary foods for up to 2 years, and beyond. Exclusive breastfeeding rose from 37.0% to 47.4% between 2012 and 2024.

Breastfeeding has a number of benefits to both the mother and the infant, that infant formula lacks. Increased breastfeeding to near-universal levels in low and middle income countries could prevent approximately 820,000 deaths of children under the age of five annually. Breastfeeding decreases the risk of respiratory tract infections, ear infections, sudden infant death syndrome (SIDS), and diarrhea for the baby, both in developing and developed countries. Other benefits have been proposed to include lower risks of asthma, food allergies, and diabetes. Breastfeeding may also improve cognitive development and decrease the risk of obesity in adulthood.

Benefits for the mother include less blood loss following delivery, better contraction of the uterus, and a decreased risk of postpartum depression. Breastfeeding delays the return of menstruation, and in very specific circumstances, fertility, a phenomenon known as lactational amenorrhea. Long-term benefits for the mother include decreased risk of breast cancer, cardiovascular disease, diabetes, metabolic syndrome, and rheumatoid arthritis. Breastfeeding is less expensive than infant formula, but its impact on mothers' ability to earn an income is not usually factored into calculations comparing the two feeding methods. It is also common for women to experience symptoms such as: vaginal dryness, De Quervain syndrome, cramping, mastitis, moderate to severe nipple pain, and a general lack of bodily autonomy. These symptoms generally peak at the start of breastfeeding but disappear or become considerably more manageable after the first few weeks.

Each feeding may last as long as 30–60 minutes, as milk supply develops and the infant learns the Suck-Swallow-Breathe pattern. However, as milk supply increases and the infant becomes more efficient at feeding, the duration of feeds may shorten to as little as 5-10 minutes per breast. While newborns and young babies feed 8-12 times per 24 hours, older infants may feed less often. When direct breastfeeding is not possible, expressing or pumping to empty the breasts can help mothers avoid plugged milk ducts and breast infection, maintain their milk supply, resolve engorgement, and provide milk to be fed to their infant at a later time. Medical conditions that do not allow breastfeeding are rare. Mothers who take certain recreational drugs should not breastfeed, however, most medications are compatible with breastfeeding. Available evidence indicates that it is unlikely that COVID-19 can be transmitted through breast milk. Smoking tobacco and consuming limited amounts of alcohol or coffee are not reasons to avoid breastfeeding.

== Breastfeeding physiology ==
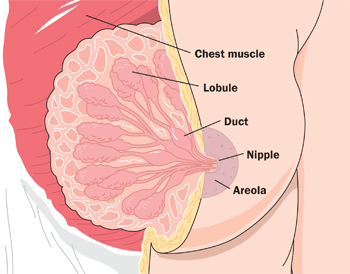
When the baby suckles their mother's breast, a hormone called oxytocin compels the milk to flow from the alveoli (lobules), through the ducts (milk canals), into the sacs (milk pools) behind the areola, and then into the baby's mouth.

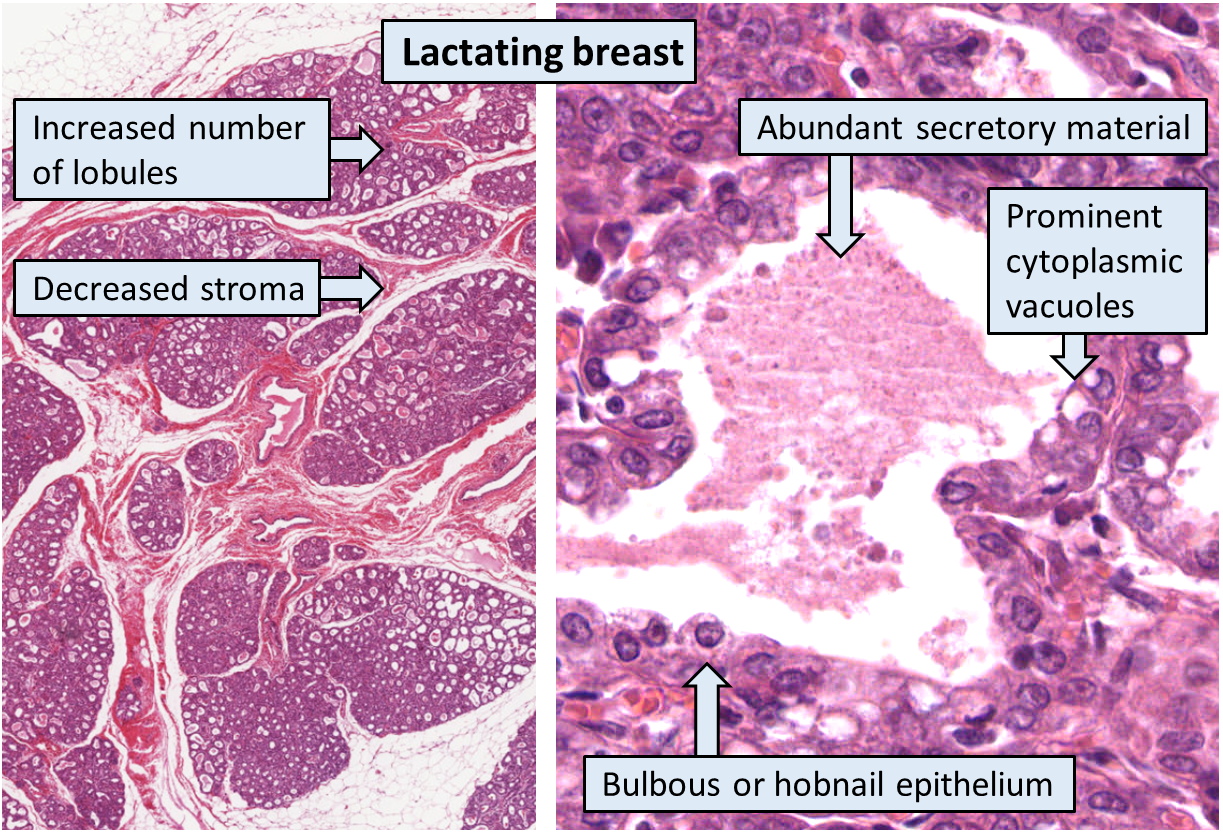
Normal histology of the breast during lactation.

Breast development starts in puberty with the growth of ducts, fat cells, and connective tissue. The ultimate size of the breasts is determined by the number of fat cells. The size of the breast is not related to a mother's breastfeeding capability or the volume of milk she can produce. The process of milk production, termed lactogenesis, occurs in 3 stages. The first stage takes place during pregnancy, allowing for the development of the breast and production of colostrum, the thick, early form of milk that is low in volume but rich in nutrition. The birth of the baby and the placenta trigger the onset of the second stage of milk production, triggering the milk to come in over the next several days. The third stage of milk production occurs gradually over several weeks and is characterized by a full milk supply that is regulated locally (at the breast), predominantly by the infant's demand for food. This differs from the second stage of lactogenesis, which is regulated centrally (in the brain) by hormone feedback loops that naturally occur after the placenta is delivered.

Although traditionally, lactation occurs following pregnancy, lactation may also be induced with hormone therapy and nipple stimulation in the absence of pregnancy.

=== Lactogenesis I and other changes in pregnancy ===
Changes in pregnancy, starting around 16 weeks gestational age, prepare the breast for lactation. These changes, collectively known as "lactogenesis I", are directed by hormones produced by the placenta and the brain, namely estrogen, progesterone, prolactin, which gradually increase throughout the pregnancy, and result in the structural development of the alveolar (milk-producing) tissue and the production of colostrum. While prolactin is the predominant hormone in milk production, progesterone, which is at high levels during pregnancy, blocks the prolactin receptors in the breast, thus inhibiting milk from "coming in" during pregnancy.

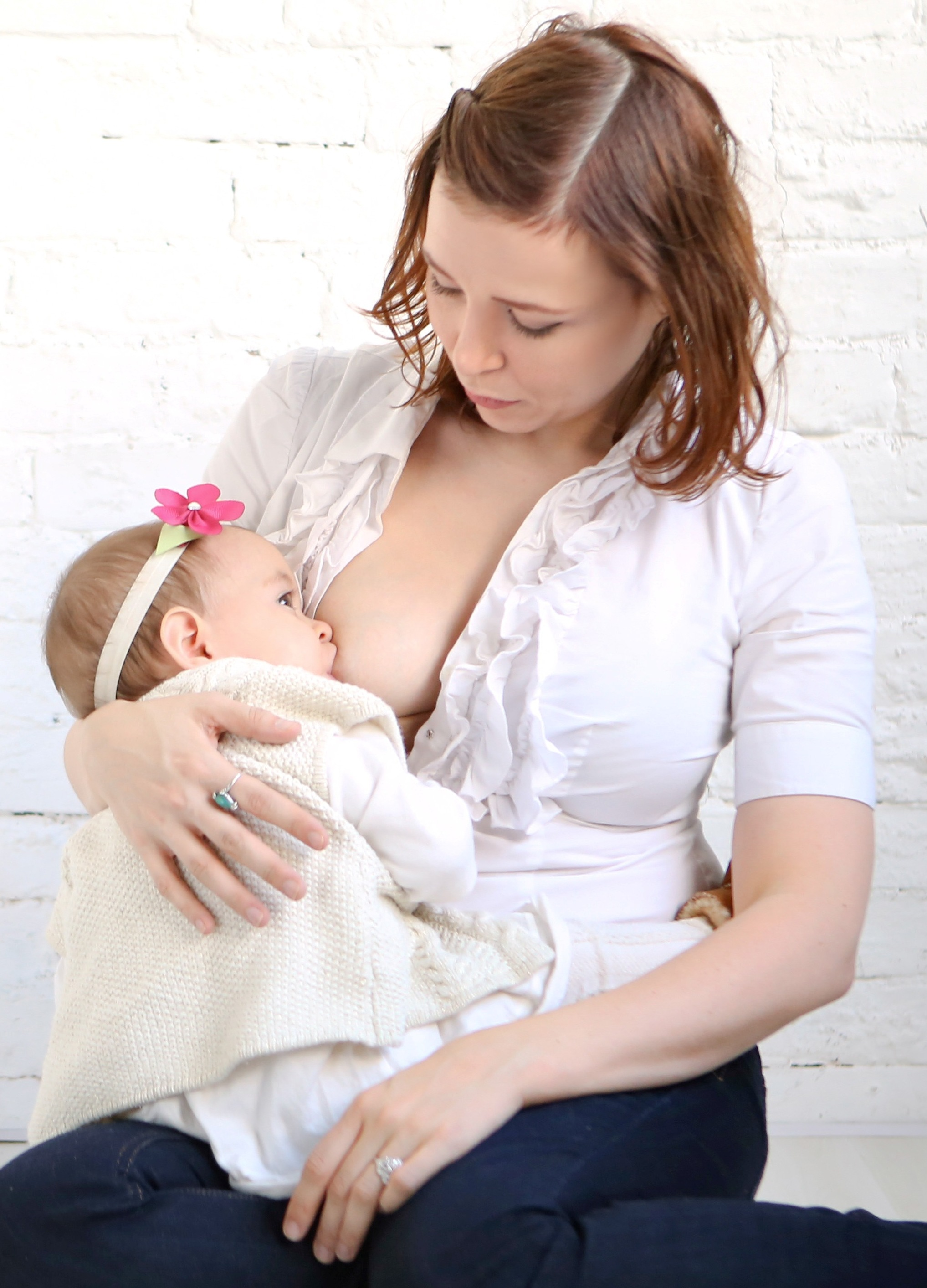
Dutch woman breastfeeding

Many other physiologic changes occur under the control of progesterone and estrogen. These changes include, but are not limited to, dilation of blood vessels, increased blood flow to the uterus, increased availability of glucose (which subsequently is passed through the placenta to the fetus), and increased skin pigmentation, which results in darkening of the nipples and areola, formation of the linea nigra, and onset of melasma of pregnancy.

From about the 16th week of pregnancy, the breasts can begin to produce milk. It's not unusual for small amounts of straw-coloured fluid called colostrum to leak from the nipples during this relatively early stage.

Breast development throughout pregnancy may result in significant Areola and Areolar gland enlargement, erectile nipples or nipple sensitivity.

=== Lactogenesis II ===
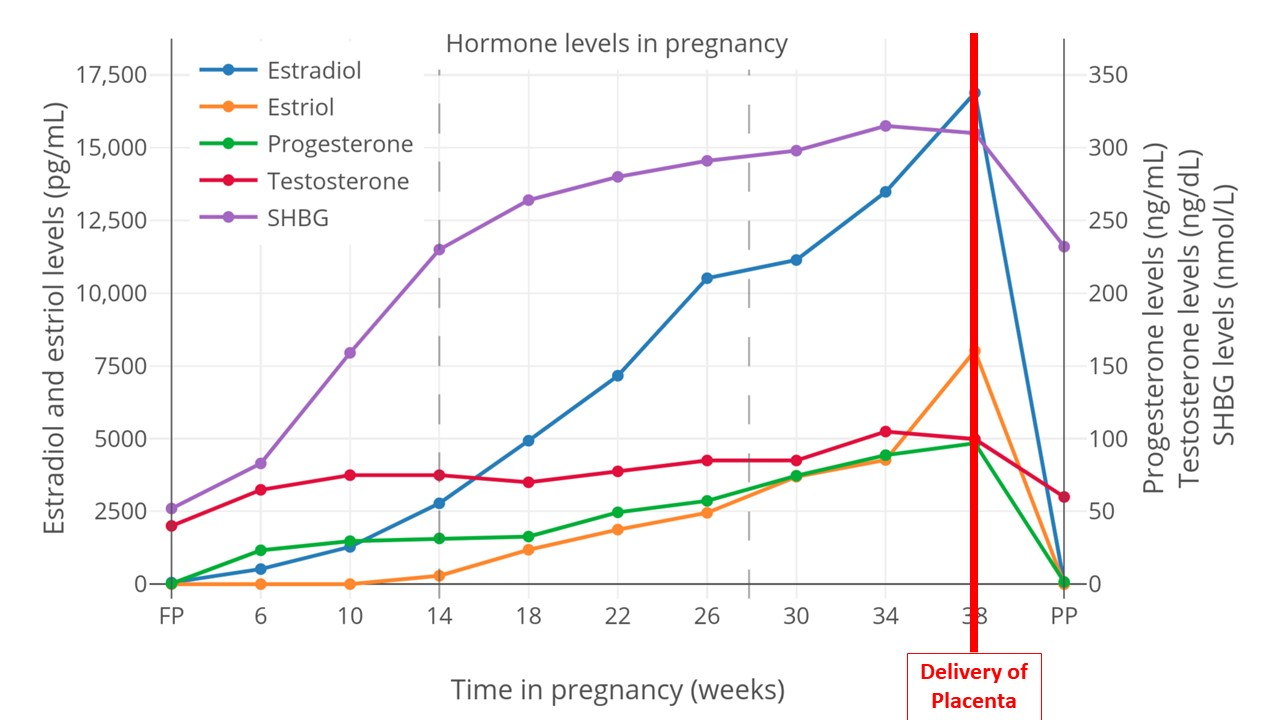
Maternal hormone levels during pregnancy and after delivery of the placenta. Estradiol, estriol, progesterone, testosterone, and sex hormone binding globulin (SHBG) all increase throughout pregnancy and experience an abrupt drop-off after delivery of the placenta.

The third stage of labor describes the period between the birth of the baby and the delivery of the placenta, which normally lasts less than 30 minutes. The delivery of the placenta causes an abrupt drop off of placental hormones. This drop, specifically in progesterone, allows prolactin to work effectively at its receptors in the breast, leading to an array of changes over the next several days that allow the milk to "come in"; these changes are known collectively as Lactogenesis II. Colostrum continues to be produced for these next few days, as Lactogenesis II occurs. Milk may "come in" as late as five days after delivery; however, this process may be delayed due to a number of factors as described in the Process "Delay in milk 'coming in'" subsection below. Oxytocin, which signals the smooth muscle of the uterus to contract during pregnancy, labor, birth and following delivery, is also involved in the process of breastfeeding. Oxytocin also contracts the smooth muscle layer of band-like cells surrounding the milk ducts and alveoli to the newly produced milk through the duct system and out through the nipple. This process is known as the milk ejection reflex, or let-down. Because of oxytocin's dual activity at the breast and the uterus, breastfeeding mothers may also experience uterine cramping at the time of breastfeeding, for the first several days to weeks.

=== Lactogenesis III ===
Prolactin and oxytocin are vital for establishing milk supply initially; however, once the milk supply is well established, the volume and content of the milk produced are controlled locally. Although prolactin levels are higher on average among breastfeeding mothers, prolactin levels themselves do not correlate to milk volume. At this stage, production of milk is triggered by milk drainage from the breasts. The only way to maintain milk supply is to drain the breasts frequently. Infrequent or incomplete drainage of the breasts, decreases blood flow to the alveoli and signals the milk-producing cells to produce less milk. Breast pumps are often used to drain the breasts when the infant is not feeding.

A condition called Mastitis sometimes occurs in this stage, resulting from incomplete milk drainage. The Academy of Breastfeeding Medicine recommends against trying to "empty" the breasts, whether through pushing the baby to feed more or through over use of a breast pump, to prevent causing milk oversupply.

== Breast milk ==
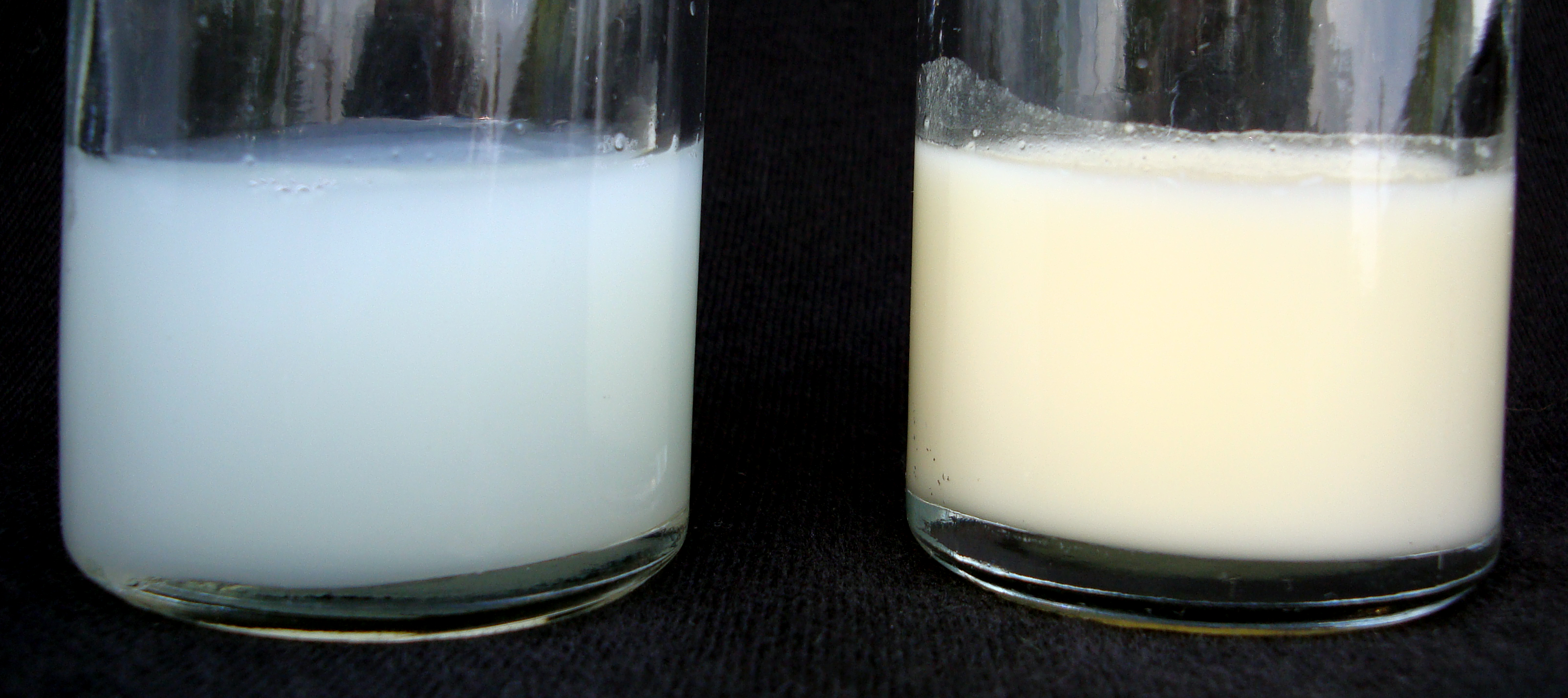
Samples of human breast milk. On the left is foremilk, the watery milk coming from a full breast. To the right is hindmilk, the creamy milk coming from a nearly empty breast.

The content of breast milk should be discussed in two separate categories: the nutritional content, and the bioactive content, i.e., the enzymes, proteins, antibodies, and signaling molecules that assist the infant in ways outside of nutrition.

=== Nutritional content ===
At birth, the composition of breast milk corresponds in quality to the specific needs of the infant. The pattern of intended nutrient content in breast milk is relatively consistent. Breastmilk is made from nutrients in the mother's bloodstream and bodily stores. It has an optimal balance of fat, sugar, water, and protein that is needed for a baby's age-appropriate growth and development. That being said, a variety of factors can influence the nutritional makeup of breastmilk, including gestational age, age of infant, maternal age, maternal smoking, and nutritional needs of the infant.

The first type of milk produced is called colostrum. The volume of colostrum produced during each feeding is appropriate for the size of the newborn's stomach and is sufficient, calorically, for feeding a newborn during the first few days of life. Produced during pregnancy and the first days after childbirth, colostrum is rich in protein and Vitamins A, B12 and K, which support infants' growth, brain development, vision, immune systems, red blood cells, and clotting cascade. The breast milk also has long-chain polyunsaturated fatty acids which help with normal retinal and neural development. The caloric content of colostrum is about 54 Calories/100mL. The second type of milk is transitional milk, which is produced during the transition from colostrum to mature breast milk. As the breast milk matures over several weeks, the protein content decreases on average. The caloric content of breastmilk is reflective of the caloric requirements of the infant, increasing steadily after 12 months. The caloric content of breastmilk in the first 12 months of breastfeeding is approximated to be 58-72 Calories/100mL. Comparatively, the caloric content after 48 months is approximately 83-129 Calories/100mL.

When a mother has her full milk supply and is feeding her infant, the first milk to be expressed is called the foremilk. Foremilk is typically thinner and less rich in calories. The hindmilk that follows is rich in calories and fat.

If the mother is not deficient in vitamins, breast milk normally supplies the baby's needs, except for Vitamin D. The CDC, National Health Service (UK), Canadian Paediatric Society, the American Academy of Pediatrics, and the American Academy of Family Physicians all agree that breast milk alone does not provide infants with an adequate amount of Vitamin D, thus they advise parents to supplement their infants with 400 IU Vitamin D daily. Providing this quantity of Vitamin D to breastfeeding infants has been shown to reduce rates of Vitamin D insufficiency (defined as 25-OH vitamin D < 50 nmol/L). However, there was insufficient evidence in the most recent Cochrane Review to determine if this quantity reduced rates of Vitamin D deficiency (defined as 25-OH vitamin D < 30 nmol/L) or rickets. Term infants typically do not need iron supplementation. Delaying cord clamping at birth for at least one minute improves the infants' iron status for the first year. When complementary (solid) foods are introduced at about 6 months of age, parents should make sure to choose iron-rich foods to help maintain their children's iron stores.

=== Bioactive content ===
In addition to nutritional benefits, breastmilk also provides enzymes, antibodies, and other substances that support the infant's growth and development. The bioactive makeup of breastmilk also changes based on the needs of the infant; for example, when an infant is recovering from an upper respiratory infection, local signaling allows for increased passage of immune cells and proteins to aid the infant's immune system.

Produced during pregnancy and the first after childbirth, colostrum is easy to digest and has laxative properties that help the infant to pass early stools. This aids in the excretion of excess bilirubin, which helps to prevent jaundice. Colostrum also helps to seal the infants gastrointestinal tract from foreign substances and germs, which may sensitize the baby to foods that the mother has eaten and decrease the risk of diarrheal illness. Although the baby has received some antibodies (IgG) through the placenta, colostrum contains a substance which is new to the newborn, secretory immunoglobulin A (IgA). IgA works to attack germs in the mucous membranes of the throat, lungs, and intestines, which are most likely to come under attack from germs. Additionally, colostrum and mature breast milk contain many antioxidant and anti-inflammatory enzymes and proteins that decrease the risk of gastrointestinal allergies to food, respiratory allergies to air particles like pollen, and other atopic diseases, such as asthma and eczema.

== Process ==
=== Commencement ===
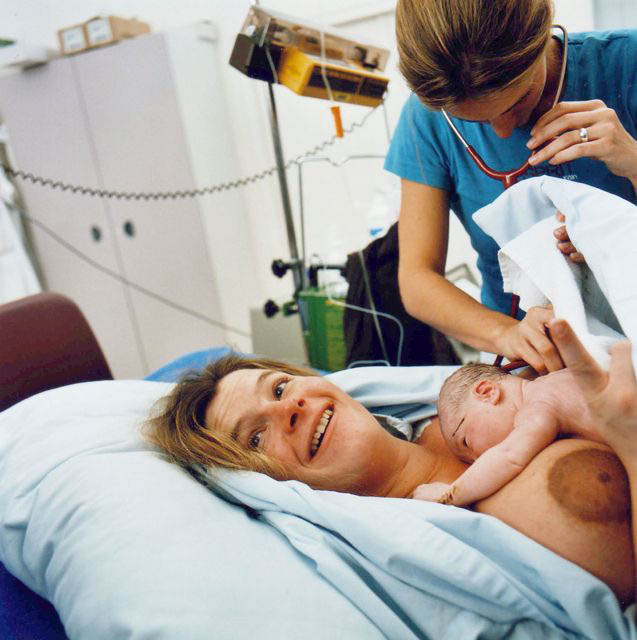
Checking a newborn baby's breath sounds with a stethoscope

It is recommended for mothers to initiate breastfeeding within the first hour after birth. Uninterrupted skin-to-skin contact and breastfeeding can begin immediately after birth, and should continue for at least one hour after birth. This period of infant-mother interaction, known generally as kangaroo care, or the "golden hour" during the immediate postpartum period, assists in the mother–child bonding for both mother and baby, and is thought to encourage instinctual breastfeeding behavior in the infant. Newborns who are immediately placed on their mother's skin have a natural instinct to latch on to the breast and start nursing, typically within one hour of birth. Success with breastfeeding in this "golden hour" increases the likelihood of successful breastfeeding at discharge.

Skin-to-skin mother-baby contact should still occur, even if the baby is born by Cesarean section. The baby is placed on the mother in the operating room or the recovery area. If the mother is unable to immediately hold the baby, a family member can provide skin-to-skin care until the mother is able.

==== Breast crawl ====
According to studies cited by UNICEF, babies naturally follow a process that leads to a first breastfeed. Shortly after birth, the infant relaxes and makes small movements of the arms, shoulders, and head. If placed on the mother's abdomen, the baby gradually inches towards the breast, known as the breast crawl and begins to feed. After feeding, it is normal for a baby to remain latched to the breast while resting. This is sometimes mistaken for a lack of appetite. Without interruptions, all babies follow this process. Rushing, by picking up and moving the infant to the breast, or interrupting the process, such as removing the baby to be weighed, may complicate subsequent feeding. Activities such as weighing, measuring, bathing, needle-sticks, and eye prophylaxis wait until after the first feeding.

==== Preterm or low-tone infants ====
Children who are born preterm (before 37 weeks), children born in the early term period (37 weeks–38 weeks and 6 days), and children born with low muscular tone, such as those with chromosomal abnormalities like Down syndrome or neurological conditions like cerebral palsy, may have difficulty in initiating breast feeds immediately after birth. These late preterm (34 weeks –36 weeks and 6 days) and early term (37 weeks–38 weeks and 6 days) infants are at increased risk for both breastfeeding cessation and complications of insufficient milk intake (e.g., dehydration, hypoglycemia, jaundice, and excessive weight loss). They are often expected to feed like term babies, but they have less strength and stamina to feed adequately.

By convention, such children are often fed on expressed breast milk or other supplementary feeds through tubes, supplemental nursing systems, bottles, spoons, or cups until they develop a satisfactory ability to suck and swallow breast milk. Regardless of the feeding method chosen, human milk feedings, whether from the mother or a donor, are important in the brain development of premature infants, and the NICU having a standardized protocol for feeding is protective against dangerous gastrointestinal infections (necrotizing enterocolitis) in these infants. Frequent breastfeeding or small amounts of supplementation may be needed for successful outcomes; breast pumping or hand expression is often helpful in providing adequate stimulation to the mother's breasts.

Starting to breastfeed may be challenging for mothers of preterm infants, especially those born before 34 weeks, because their breasts may still be developing (in Lactogenesis I, see Breastfeeding Physiology). Additionally, mother–infant separation and the stressful environment of the NICU are also barriers to breastfeeding. Availability of a lactation specialist in the NICU can be helpful for mothers trying to establish their milk supply. Additionally, skin-to-skin (Kangaroo Care) is safe and beneficial to both mother and baby. Kangaroo Care stabilizes newborn premature infants' vital signs, such as their heart rate, providing a naturally warm environment that helps them regulate their temperature. It is also beneficial to the mother, as it may improve the development of milk supply and be beneficial for mental health.

=== Timing ===
Newborn babies usually breastfeed 8 to 12 times every 24 hours, and they typically express hunger cues every one to three hours for the first two to four weeks of their lives. A newborn has a small stomach capacity, approximately 20 mL. The amount of breast milk that is produced is timed to meet the infant's needs in that the first milk, colostrum, is concentrated but produced in only very small amounts, gradually increasing in volume to meet the expanding size of the infant's stomach capacity. Cluster feeding may occur for several months, whereby infants will feed very frequently (every 30 minutes to 1 hour), usually associated with developmental milestones.

Many newborns typically feed for 10 to 15 minutes on each breast; however, feeds may last up to 45 minutes, depending on the infant's alertness and efficiency.

Nutritive sucking follows a slow, rhythmic pattern, with one to two sucks per swallow. Non-nutritive sucking is a faster-paced sucking pattern with few swallows. This swallow pattern is often observed at the beginning or the end of a feed. At the beginning of the feed, this pattern triggers milk letdown, while at the end of the feed, this may signal that the infant is tired or becoming relaxed with a slower milk velocity.

=== Duration and exclusivity ===
Exclusive breastfeeding rate

Numerous health organizations, including, but not limited to, the CDC, WHO, National Health Service, Canadian Pediatric Society, American Academy of Pediatrics, and American Academy of Family Physicians, recommend breastfeeding exclusively for six months following birth, unless medically contraindicated. Exclusive breastfeeding is defined as "an infant's consumption of human milk with no supplementation of any type (no water, no juice, no nonhuman milk and no foods) except for vitamins, minerals and medications." Supplementation with human donor breastmilk may be indicated in some specific cases, as discussed below. After solids are introduced at around six months of age, continued breastfeeding is recommended. The American Academy of Pediatrics recommends that babies be breastfed at least until 12 months, or longer if both the mother and child wish. The World Health Organization's guidelines recommend "continue[d] frequent, on-demand breastfeeding until two years of age or beyond. The American Academy of Pediatrics policy statement also supports continued breastfeeding to 2 years and older, depending on the mother and child.

Extended breastfeeding means breastfeeding after the age of 12 or 24 months, depending on the source. In Western countries such as the United States, Canada, and Great Britain, extended breastfeeding is relatively uncommon and can provoke criticism.

Globally exclusive breastfeeding rose from 37.0% to 47.4% between 2012 and 2024;. In the United States, 35% of babies born in 2018 were breastfed for 12 months, and 25.8% were exclusive breastfed for 6 months, as recommended by the American Academy of Pediatrics, though rates vary by race and ethnicity. In India, mothers commonly breastfeed for 2 to 3 years.

==== Supplementation ====
Supplementation is defined as the use of additional milk or fluid products to feed an infant, in addition to breastmilk, during the first 6 months of life. The Academy of Breastfeeding Medicine recommends only supplementing when medically indicated, as opposed to mixing use of formula and breastmilk for reasons that are not necessarily medical indications. Some medical indications for supplementation include low blood sugar, dehydration, excessive weight loss or poor gain, and jaundice in the infant; true low milk supply; severe nipple pain unrelieved by interventions; and medical contraindications to breastfeeding, as described below. Supplements can be delivered at the breast through a supplemental nursing system to stimulate the production of the mother's own milk and to preserve the breastfeeding relationship. Some parents may desire to supplement proactively if early signs of insufficient intake, such as decreased urination, dry mucous membranes, or persistent signs of hunger, are noticed. If these signs are noticed, it is important to have the mother-infant dyad evaluated by a breastfeeding specialist or pediatrician to determine the true cause of the symptoms and determine the need for supplementation. Often, these symptoms are caused by poor milk transfer at the breast and can be solved with adjustments to the latch. Occasionally, they may be caused by other processes, unrelated to breastfeeding, so evaluation is necessary. Supplementation with formula is associated with decreased rates of exclusive breastfeeding at 6 months, and overall decreased length of breastfeeding.

In terms of what to supplement with, the first choice is always the mother's own breastmilk, save any medical contraindications to its use. The second best option for supplementation is pasteurized human donor milk. Finally, specific formulas may be used for supplementation if maternal or donor breastmilk is not an option. One situation where this may be the case is in cases of infant metabolic diseases, such as galactosemia. The Academy of Breastfeeding Medicine recommends that supplementation only be used when medically indicated and when overseen by a medical professional, such as a pediatrician or family physician, and after consultation with an IBCLC. Without sufficient breast stimulation, supplementation can reduce the mother's milk production, so pumping would be indicated in these cases if continued breastfeeding is desired.

Indications for use of donor breastmilk are very closely outlined by the American Academy of Pediatrics (AAP). Due to low availability and high cost of donor breastmilk, the AAP recommends prioritizing the use of the milk for infants born with a weight of less than 1500g (approximately 3lb 5oz), as it is helpful in decreasing rates of the severe intestinal infection, necrotizing enterocolitis, in this population.

=== Position ===
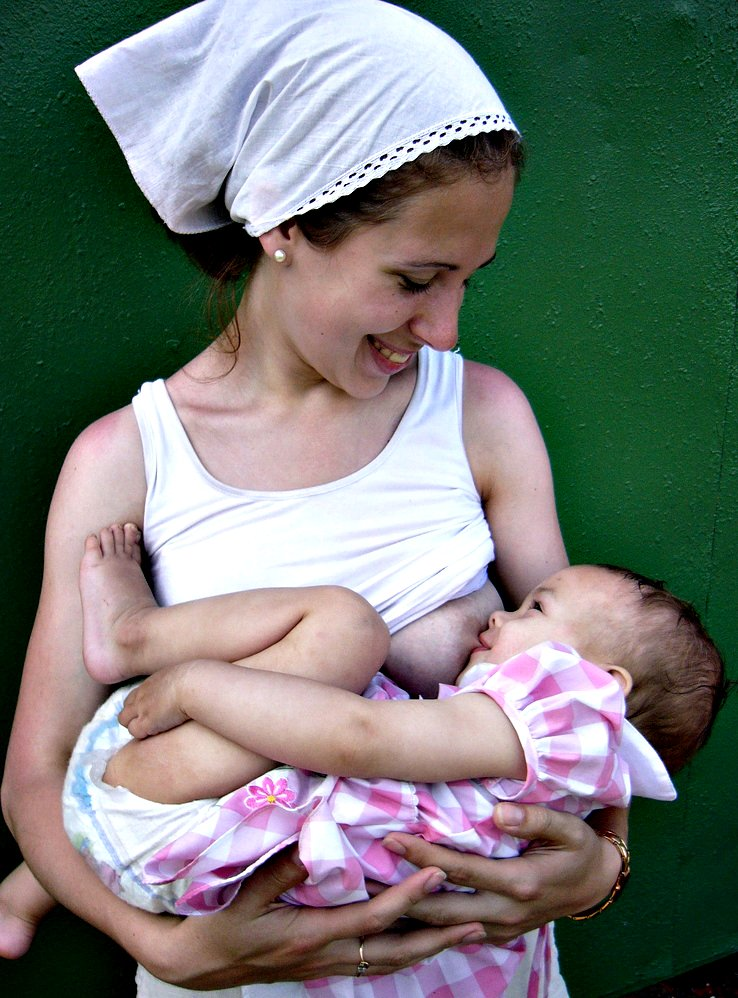
A mother in Russia cradling an infant while breastfeeding

Effective positioning and technique for latching on are necessary to prevent nipple soreness and allow the baby to obtain enough milk.

Babies can successfully latch on to the breast from multiple positions. Each baby may prefer a particular position. The "football" hold places the baby's legs next to the mother's side with the baby facing the mother. This hold can be helpful for breastfeeding mothers recovering from a caesarean section (C-section). Using the "cradle" or "cross-body" hold, the mother supports the baby's head in the crook of her arm. The "cross-over" hold is similar to the cradle hold, except that the mother supports the baby's head with the opposite hand. The mother may choose a reclining position on her back or side with the baby lying next to her. To help with breastfeeding, some people use a nursing pillow.

No matter the position the mother-infant dyad finds most comfortable, there are a few components of every position that will help facilitate a successful latch. One key component is maternal comfort. The mother should be comfortable while breastfeeding, and should have her back, feet, and arms supported with pillows as necessary. Additionally, when starting the latch process, the infant should be aligned with their abdomen facing their mother, which can be remembered as "tummy-to-mummy," and with their hips, shoulders, and head aligned. This alignment helps to facilitate proper, efficient swallowing mechanics.

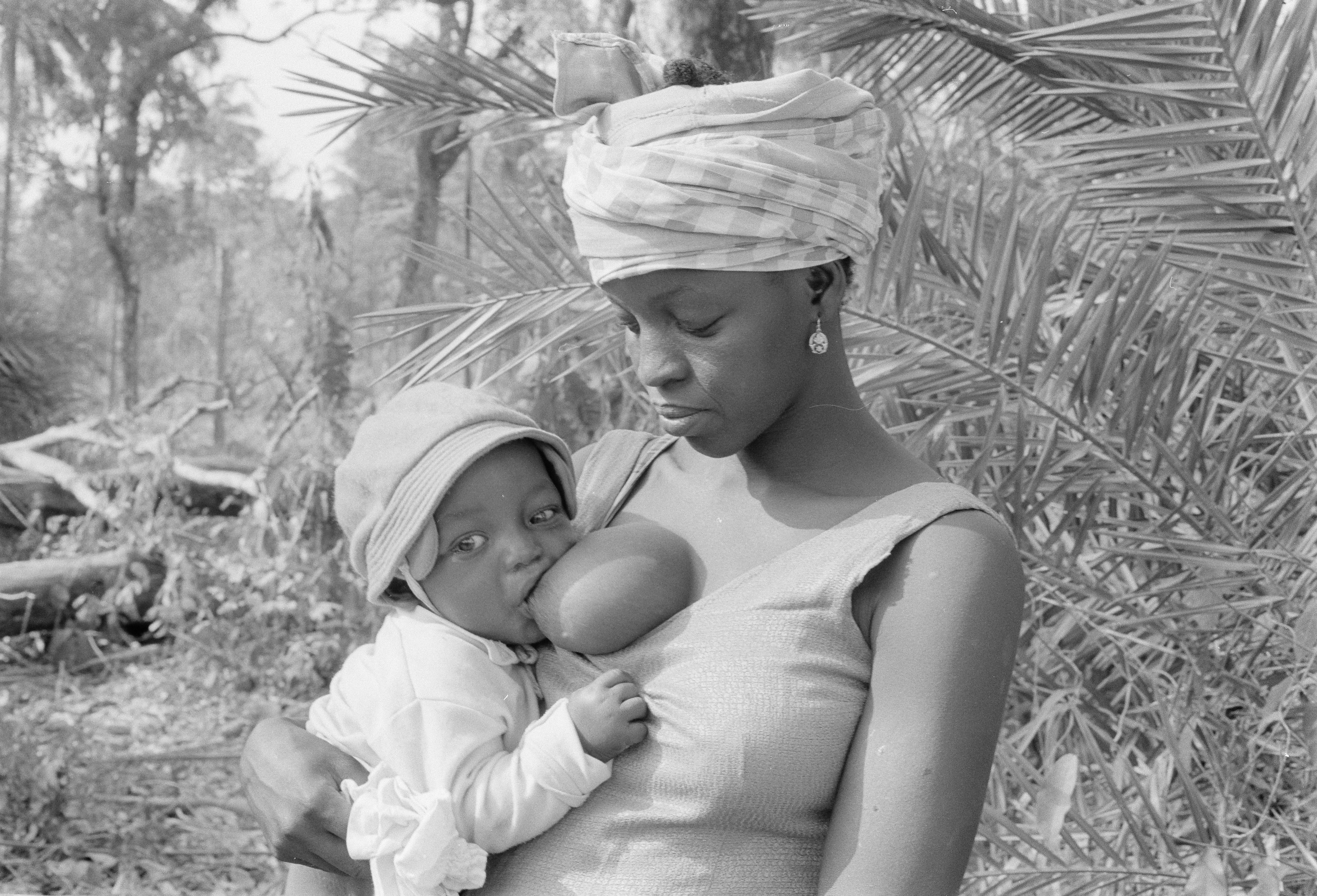
Standing mother breastfeeding her baby, Canjambari, Guinea-Bissau, 1973

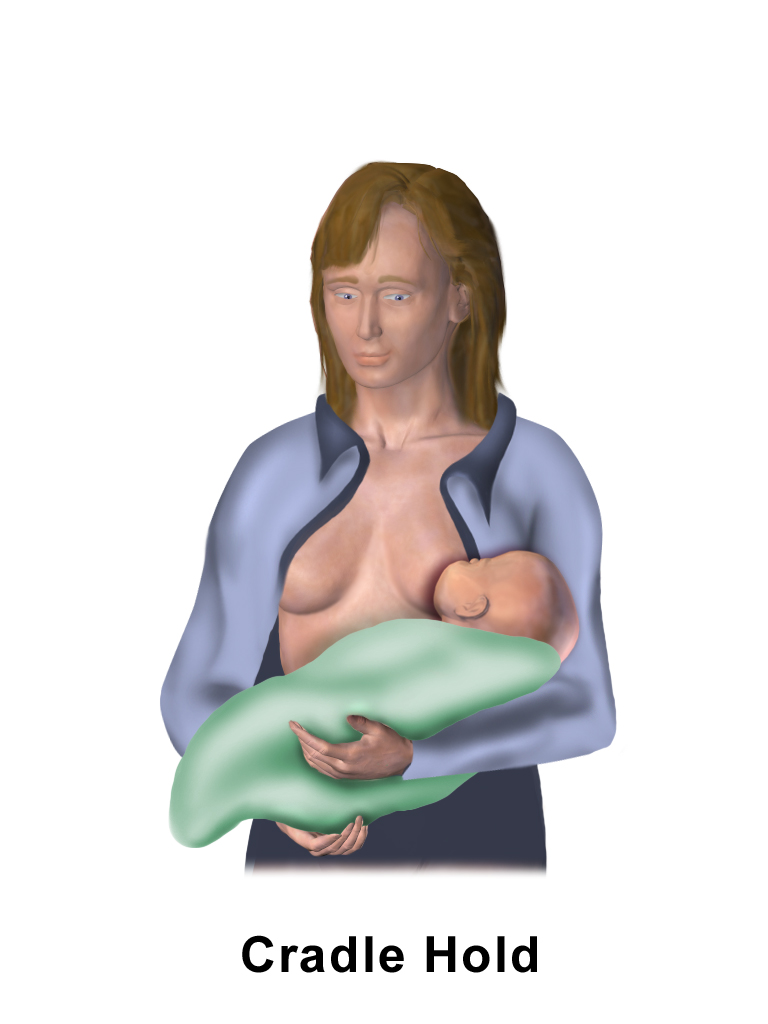
Breastfeeding – Cradle hold.

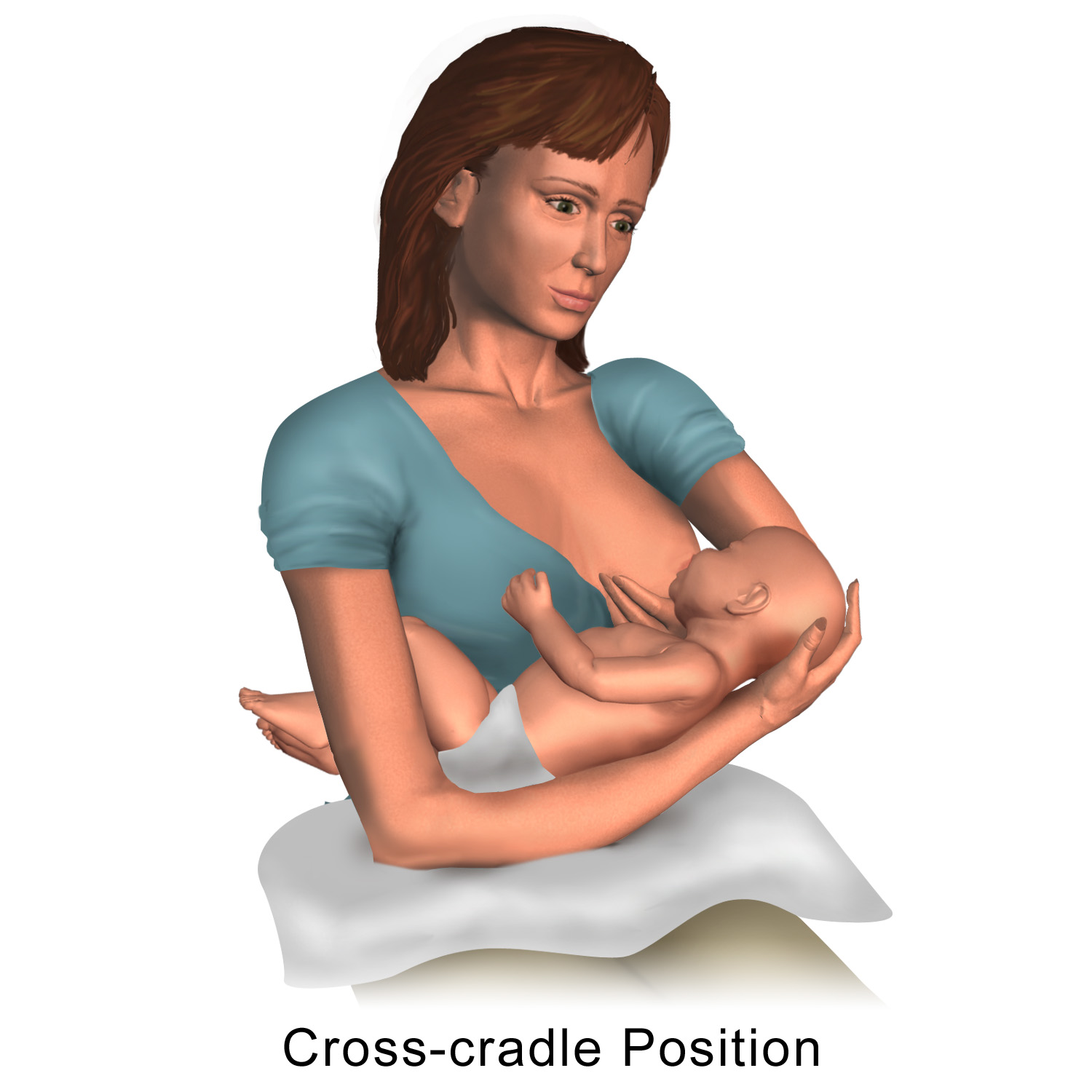
Breastfeeding – Cross cradle position.

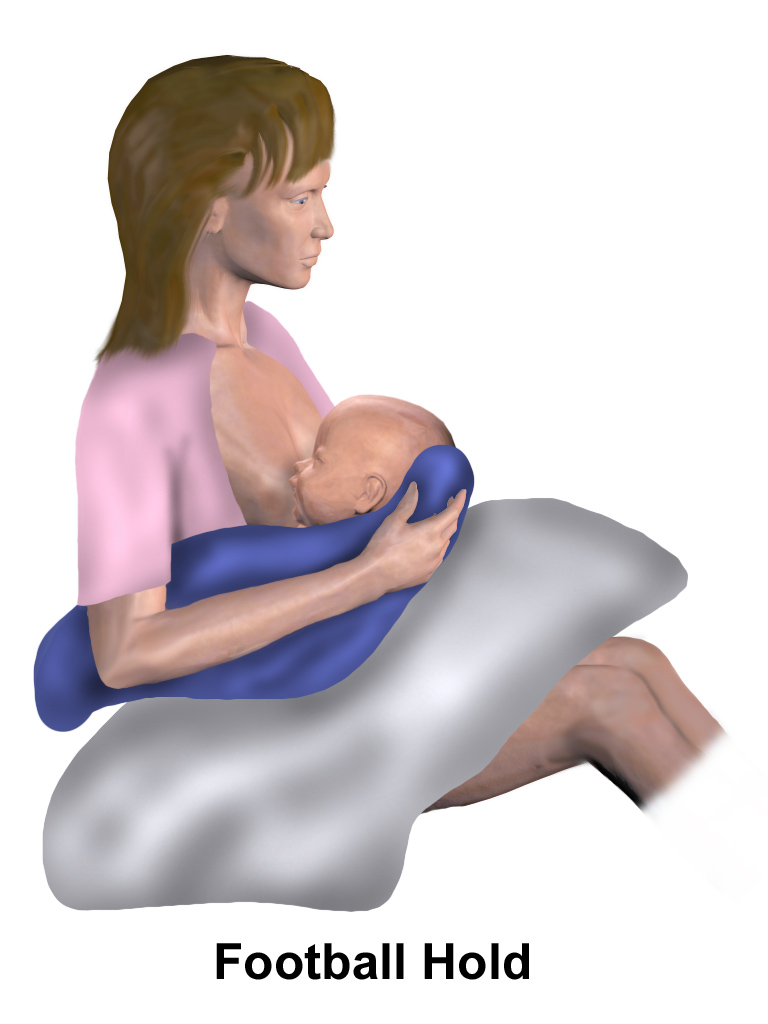
Breastfeeding – Football hold.

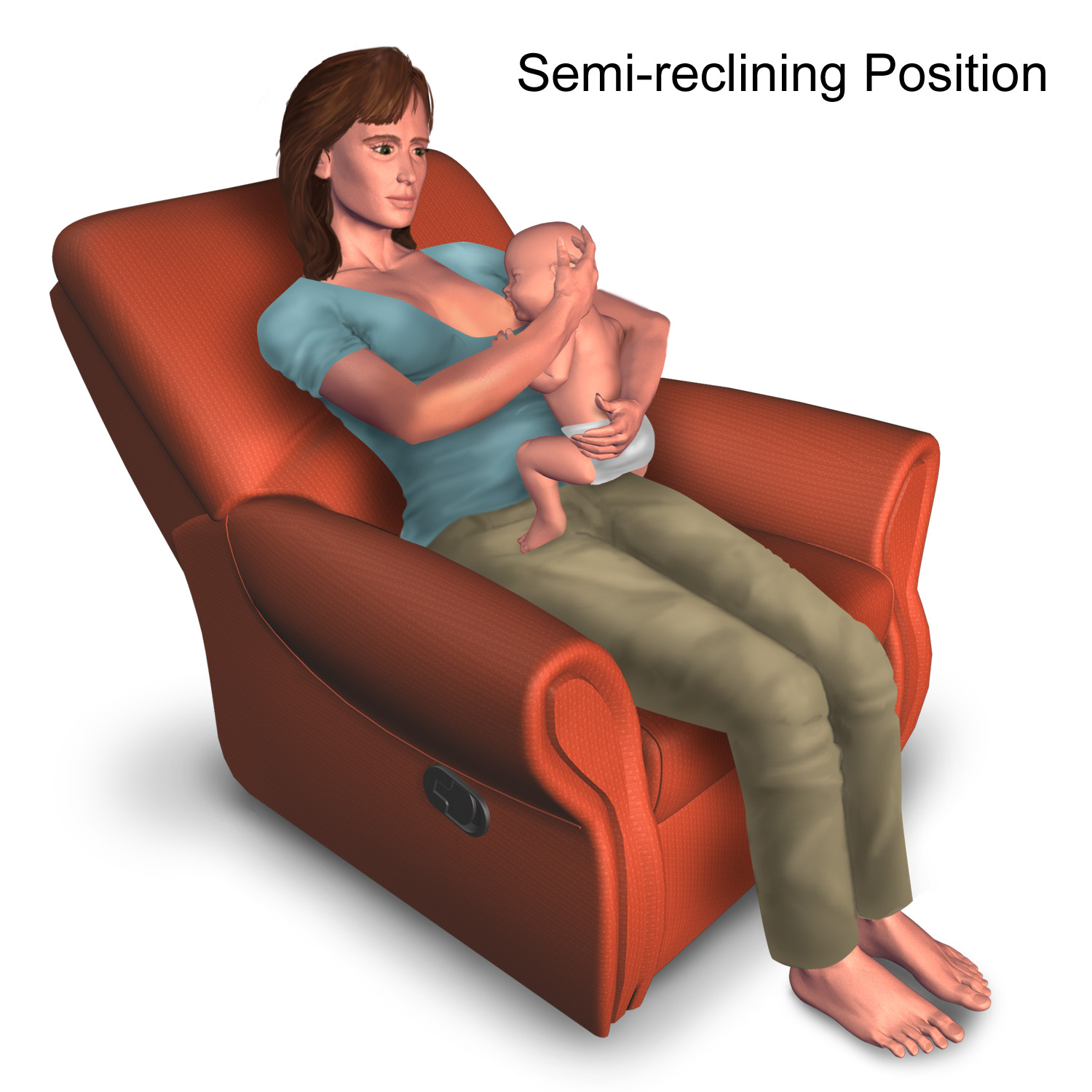
Breastfeeding – Semi-reclining position.

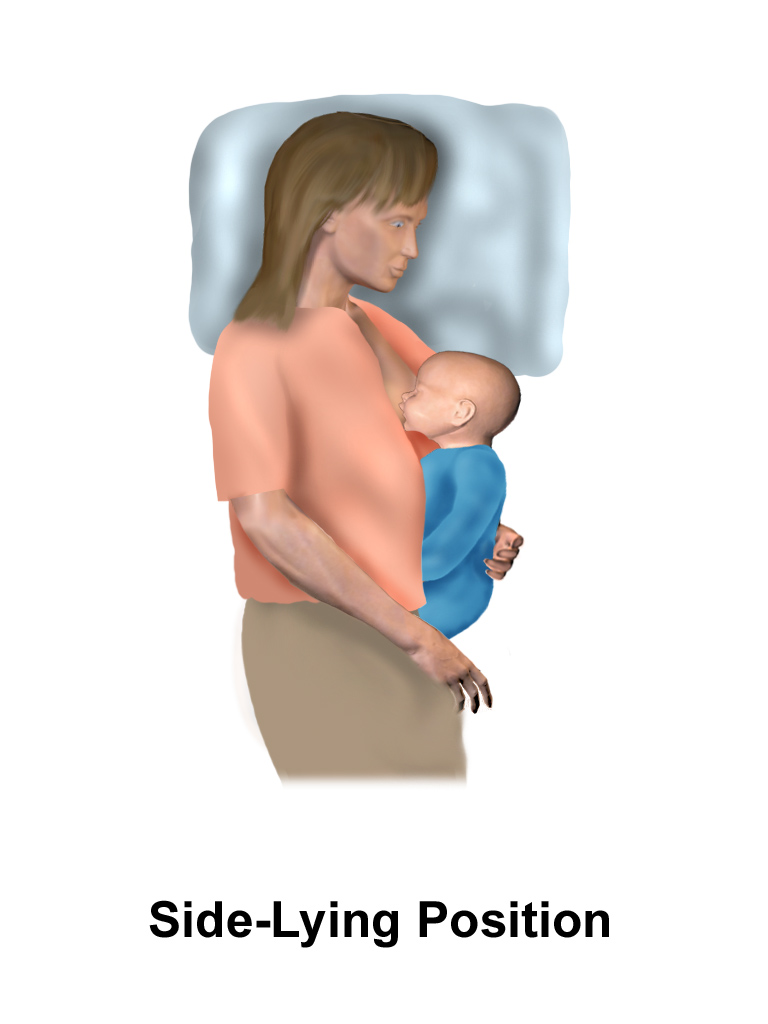
Breastfeeding – Side-lying position.

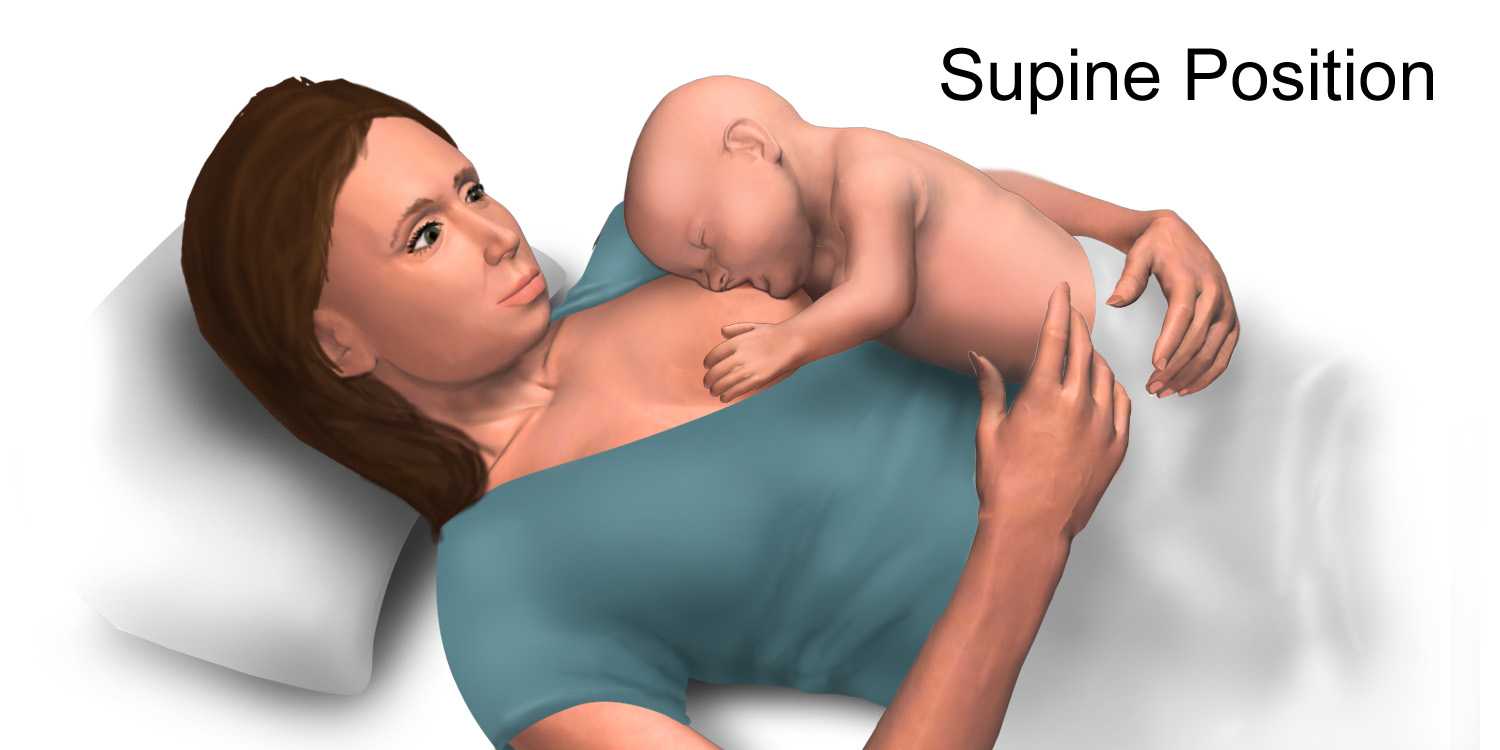
Breastfeeding – Supine position.

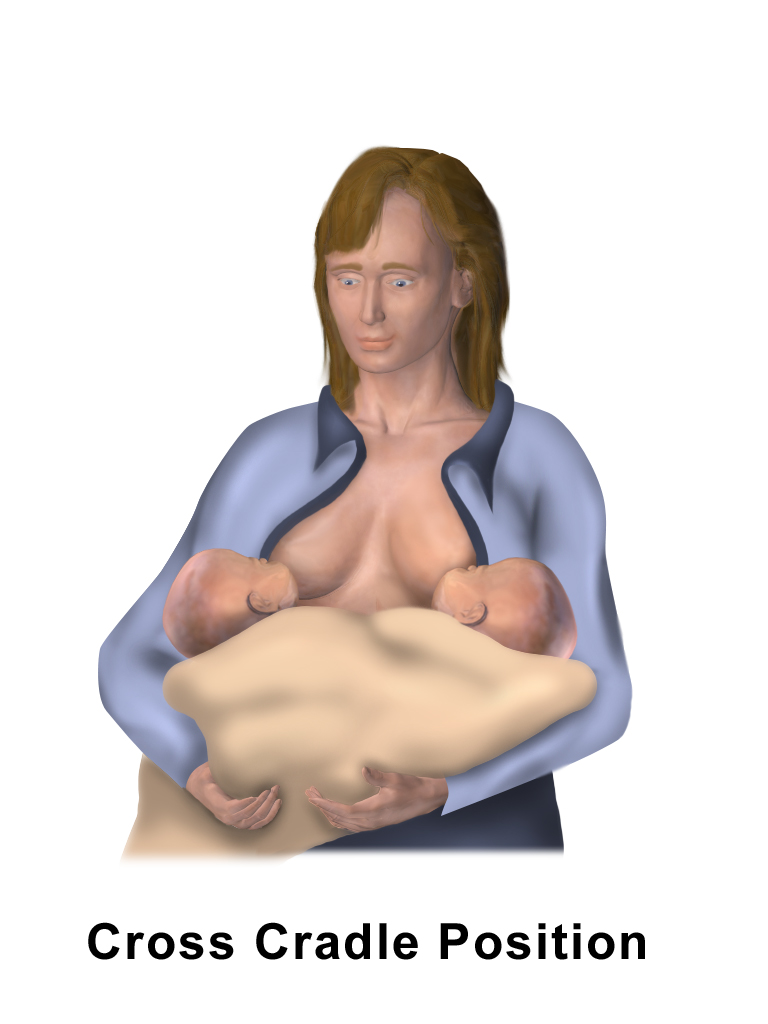
Breastfeeding – Twins, cross cradle position I.

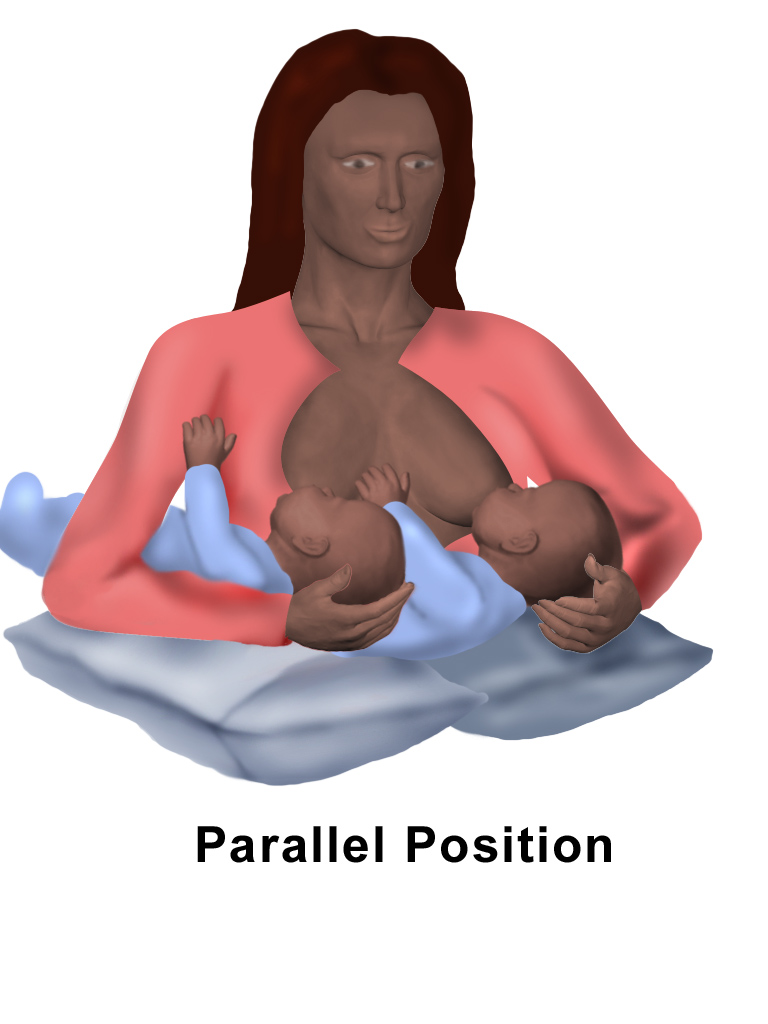
Breastfeeding – Twins, football or clutch hold.

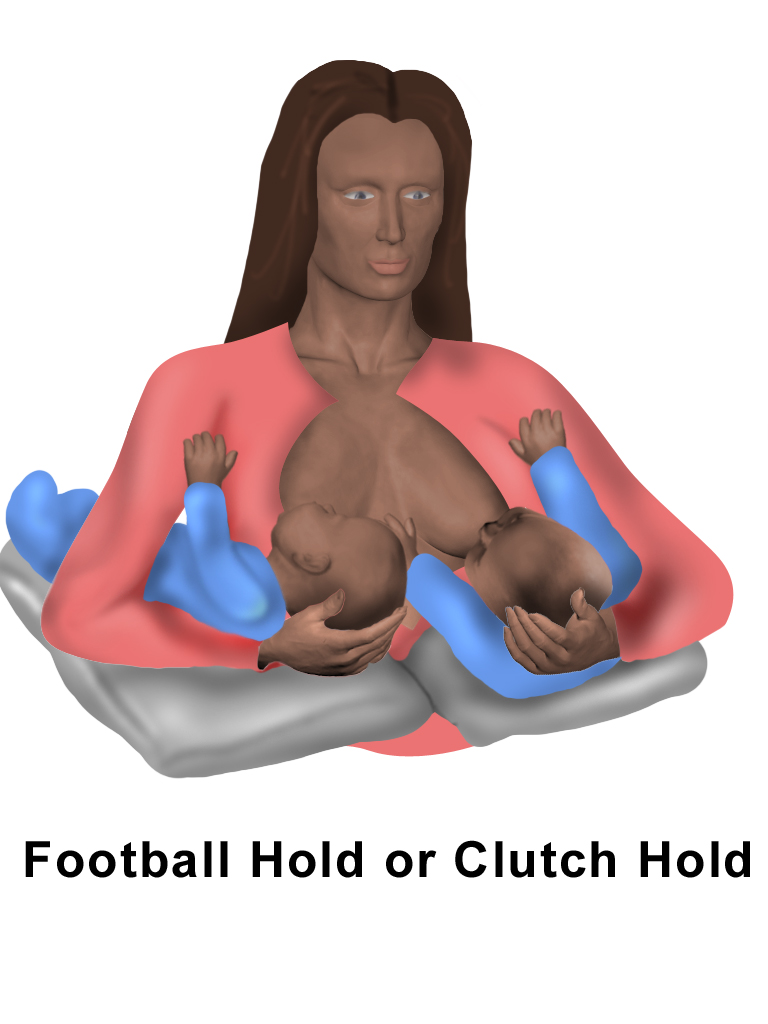
Breastfeeding – Twins, parallel position II.

=== Latching ===
Latching refers to how the baby uses their lips, cheek, and tongue to attach to the nipple and breast.

==== Making use of anatomy and reflexes ====
The process of latching a newborn onto the breast

Sebaceous glands called Glands of Montgomery located in the areola secrete an oily fluid that lubricates and protects the nipple during latching. The visible portions of the glands can be seen on the skin's surface as small, round bumps.

The rooting reflex is the baby's natural tendency to turn towards the breast with the mouth open wide. When preparing to latch, mothers should make use of this reflex by gently stroking the baby's philtrum, the area between the upper lip and the nose, with their nipple to induce the baby to open their mouth with a wide gape. One way to help the infant achieve a deep latch is to compress the breast tissue into a "U" or "hamburger shape," so that the infant can fit the breast tissue into their mouth. This is done by the mother placing her thumb and fingers in line with the infant's nose and mouth, respectively, and using this grip to compress the breast tissue.

==== Bringing the infant in to latch ====
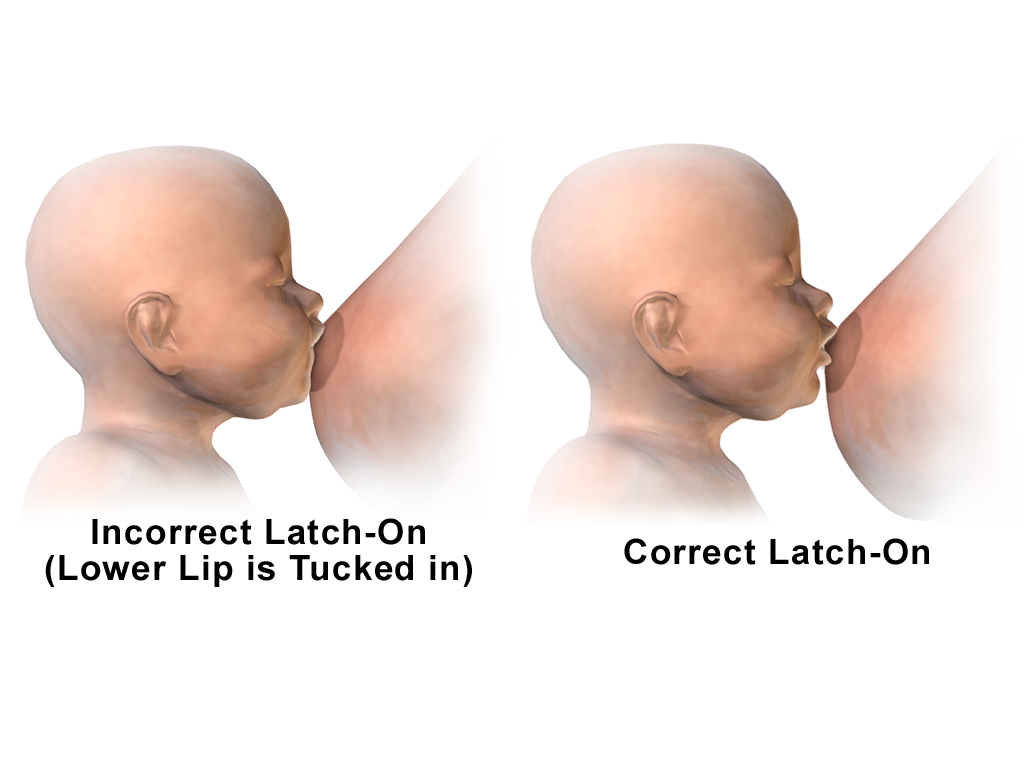
Illustration noting the lower lip of the infant during latching

If the newborn seems to need help in latching on, the mother should focus on helping the infant by bringing their chin to the breast first. This facilitates a deep, asymmetric latch, and also helps the infant extend their neck and tilt their forehead back to maintain this deep latch and ease the swallowing process.

==== Signs of a good, deep latch ====
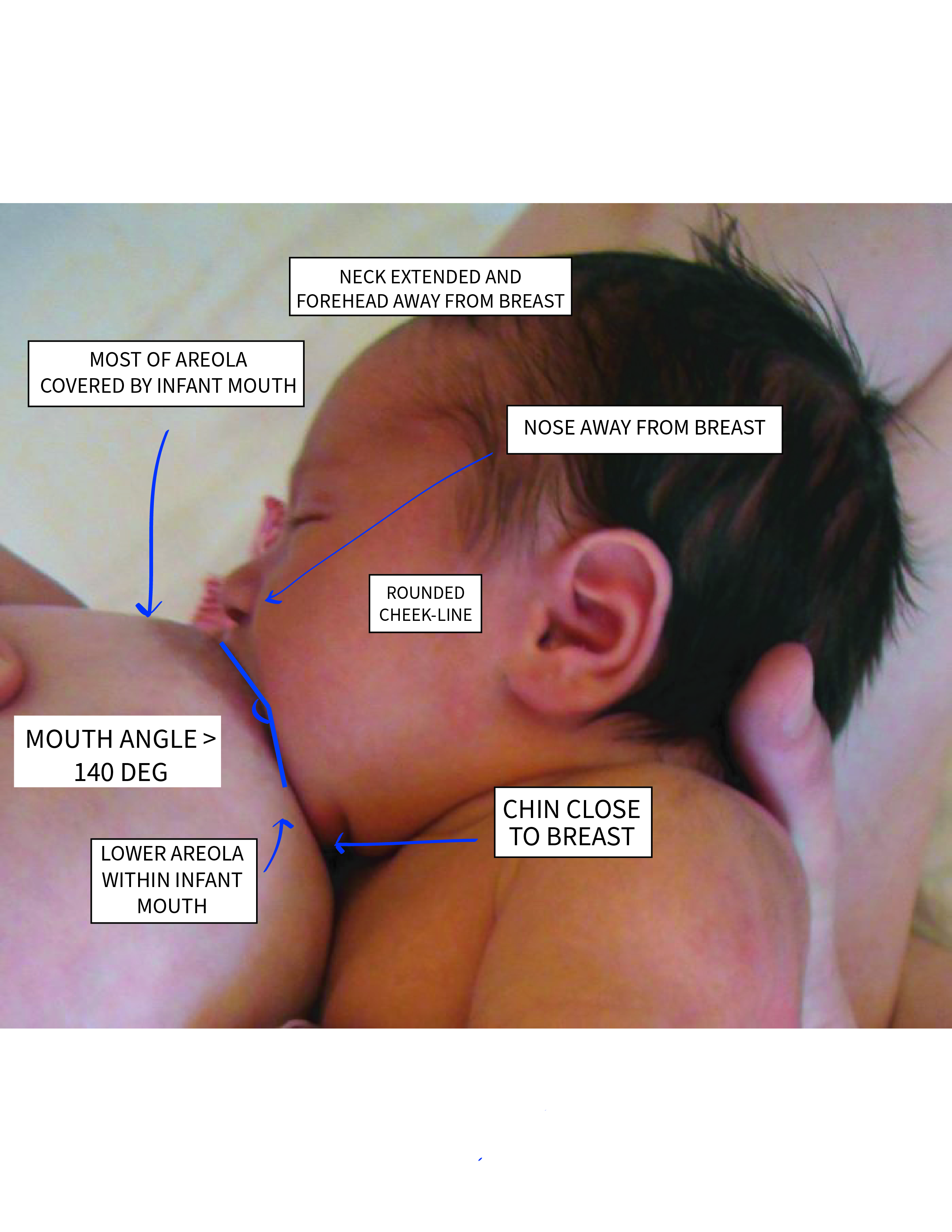
Example and indicators of a good latch

In a good latch, a large amount of the areola, in addition to the nipple, is in the baby's mouth. The amount of areola visible on either side of the infant's mouth should be asymmetric, meaning most of the "bottom" of the areola should be in the infant's mouth, and much more of the "top" of the areola should be visible. This position helps point the nipple toward the roof of the infant's mouth, helping the infant recruit more milk. The baby's lips should be flanged out. The neck should be extended to facilitate swallowing, and as such, the chin will be close to the breast, and the forehead and nose should be far from the breast. Another sign of a good latch is the contour of the infant's cheeks; the cheeks should be rounded all the way to the edge of the mouth, rather than dimpled or creased at the edge of the mouth. This is a good indicator of effective suck mechanics. Additionally, to achieve a deep latch, the infant's mouth must be open wide, preferably wider than 140 degrees.

==== Signs of a poor, shallow latch ====
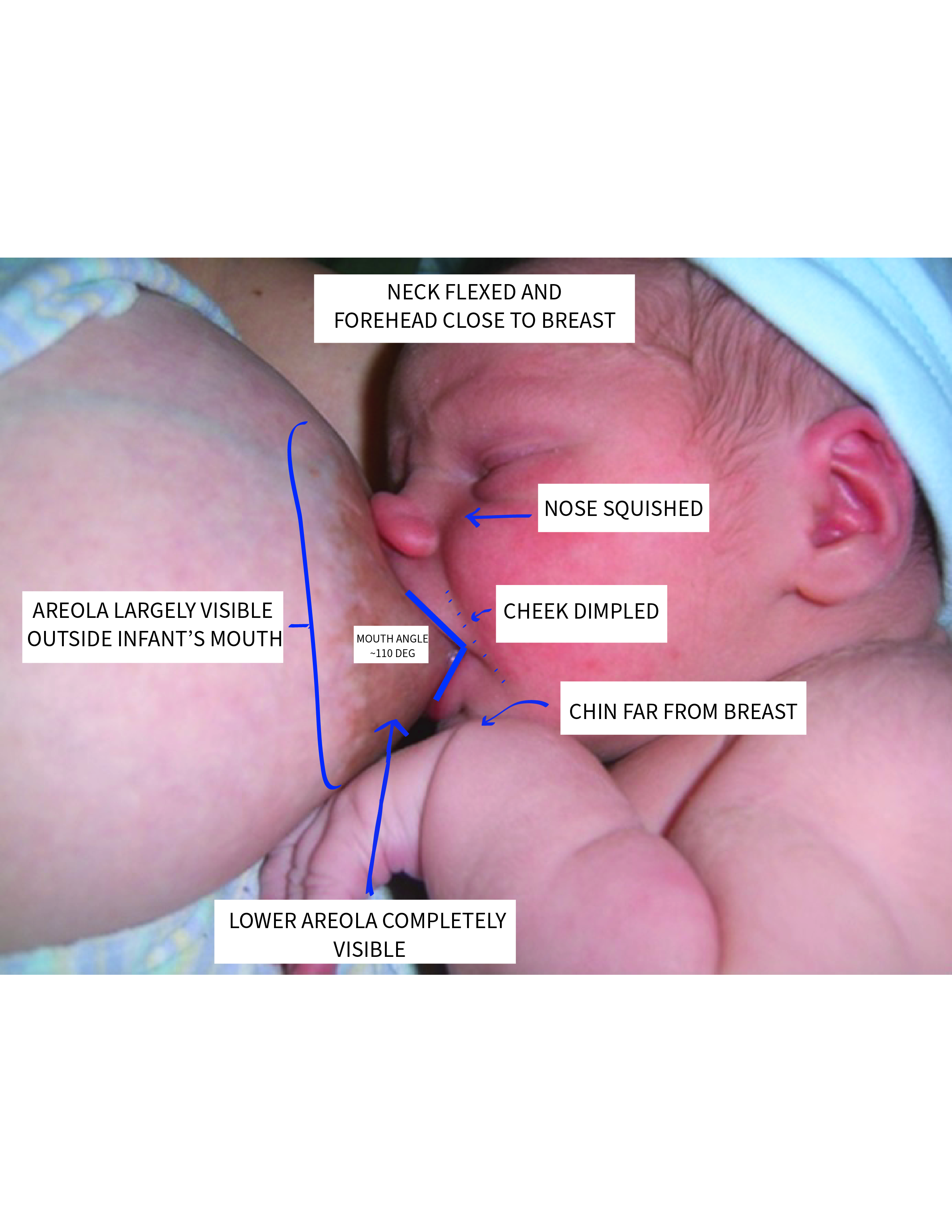
Example and indicators of a poor, shallow latch

In a poor, shallow latch, the infant may latch close to, or at, the nipple, which can cause the mother pain. While the infant is at the breast, the first indicators of a shallow latch are having the areola be largely visible outside the infant's mouth and a narrow infant mouth angle. Additional signs result from poor positioning when the infant comes toward the breast to latch. If the infant leads with their brow or forehead, they are likely to flex their neck; this latching mechanism causes the nipple to point down and then hit the hard palate during sucking. From an external view, this manifests as the nose and forehead being close to the breast and the chin far from the breast. This neck flexion also obstructs the normal swallowing mechanism, preventing the infant from drinking efficiently. In addition to not being able to swallow properly, this shallow latch prevents the infant from adequately compressing the glandular tissue behind the nipple and stimulating milk flow; thus, they may begin to apply more suction, which manifests externally as cheek dimpling, or sucking their cheeks in.

=== Let-down reflex ===
When the baby suckles, muscles in the breast squeeze milk towards the nipples. This is called the let-down reflex. Some women report they do not experience anything, while others report a tingling sensation, which is sometimes described as quite strong. The baby may be seen to respond to the start of milk flow by changing from quick sucks to deep rhythmic swallows. Sometimes the let-down is so strong that the baby splutters and coughs, and the mother may need to remove the baby from her breast for a short time until the flow becomes less forceful. Milk may also let down unexpectedly when a mother hears her baby cry or even only thinks about the baby. Nursing pads may be made or purchased to absorb unexpected milk flows.

=== Problems with breastfeeding ===
==== Inverted nipples ====
Infants of mothers with inverted nipples can still achieve a good latch with perhaps a little extra effort. For some women, the nipple may easily become erect when stimulated. Other women may require modified breastfeeding techniques, and some may need extra devices, such as nipple shells, modified syringes, or breast pumps to expose the nipple. La Leche League and Toronto Public Health offer several techniques to use during pregnancy or even in the early days following birth that may help to bring a flat or inverted nipple out.

==== Use of pacifiers ====
The World Health Organization's Ten Steps to Successful Breastfeeding recommends total avoidance of pacifiers for breastfeeding infants. In 2016, a large review of studies reported that the use of a pacifier beginning at birth or after lactation was established did not significantly affect the duration of exclusive and partial breastfeeding up to four months of age. The CDC, however, currently (2022) reports that early use of pacifiers can have a negative outcome on the success of breastfeeding, and they suggest that it should be delayed until breastfeeding is firmly established.

==== Ankyloglossia ====
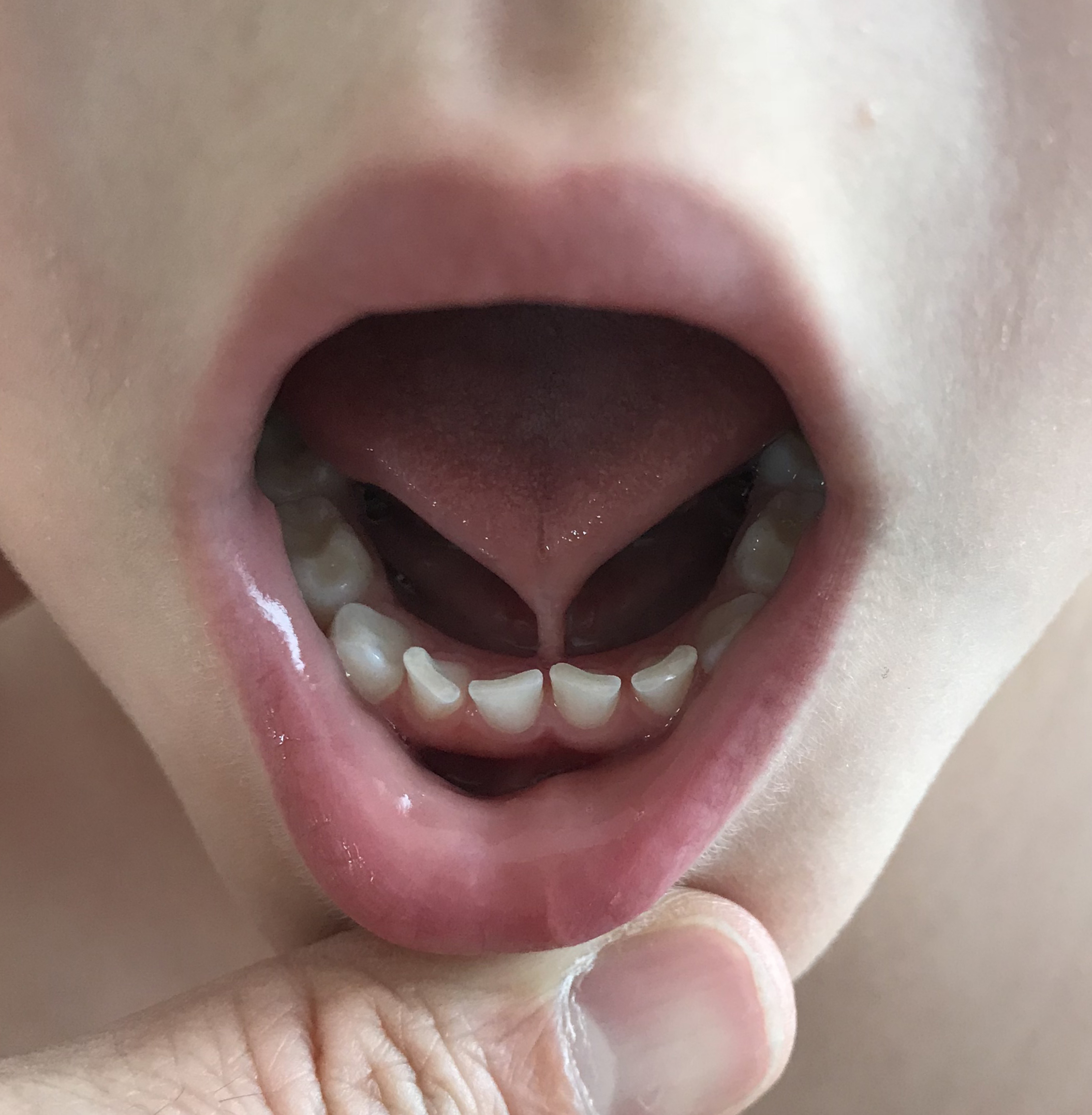
Anterior tongue-tie on a four-year-old

Ankyloglossia, also called "tongue-tie" may cause shallow latch, poor milk transfer, and other problems with breastfeeding. There are two types of tongue-ties: an anterior tongue-tie occurs when a band of tissue, known as the frenulum, attaches the tongue to the base of the mouth, restricting the tongue's vertical movement and preventing the infant from pressing the breast and nipple into the soft palate; a posterior tongue-tie is a band of tissue that can only be felt on exam, and tends to impact breastfeeding less severely than its anterior counterpart. If it is determined that the inability to latch on properly is related to ankyloglossia, a simple surgical procedure to clip the frenulum can correct the condition. The Academy of Breastfeeding Medicine and the Australian Dental Association have raised concern over the growing trend of oral tie surgeries, due to evidence for benefit being low-quality, inconsistent, or unsupported.

==== Engorgement ====
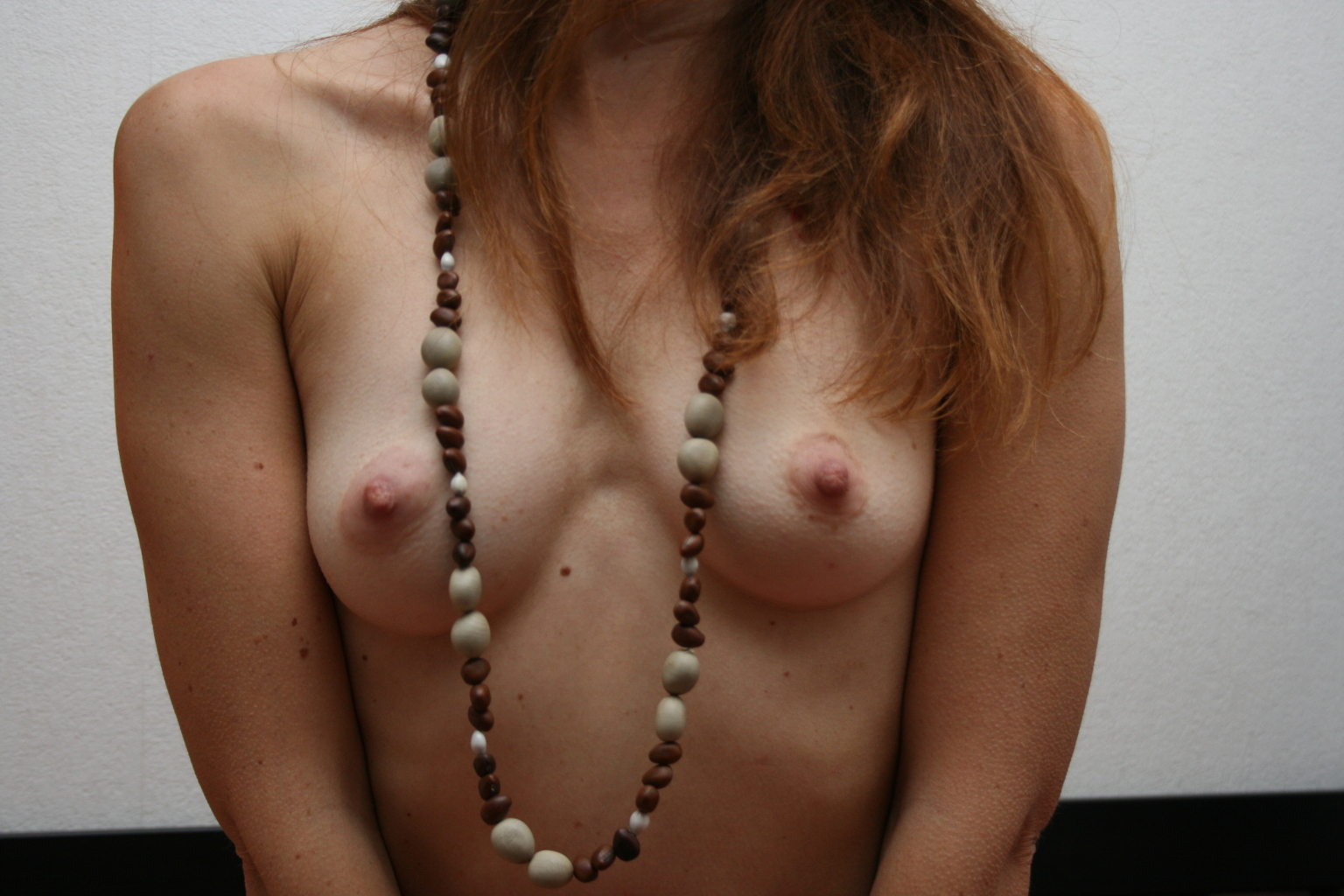
Pre-pregnant human breasts

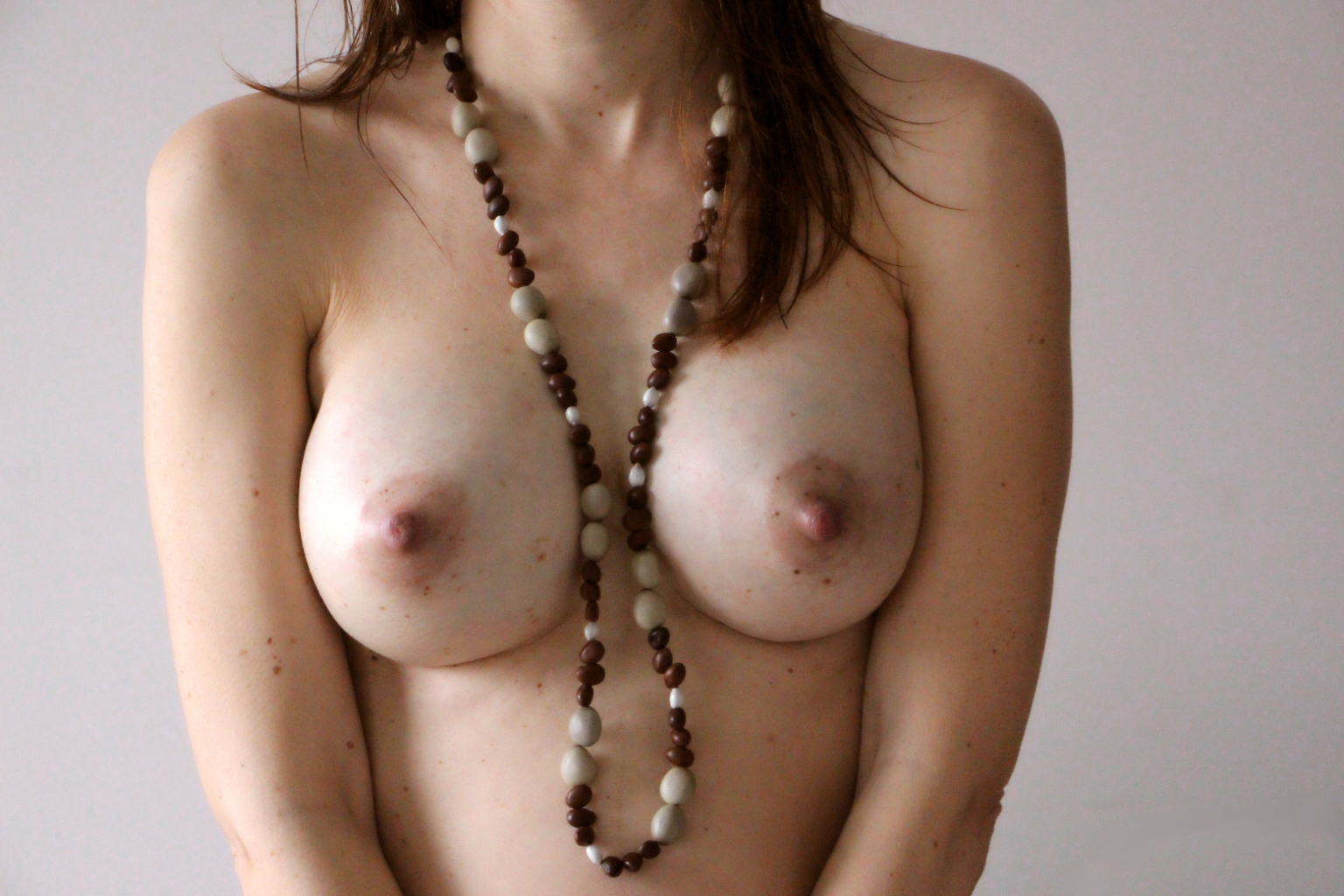
Lactating human breasts showing evidence of engorgement

Engorgement is the swelling and stretching of the breast tissue due to the accumulation of fluid in the tissue surrounding and supporting the milk-producing cells and ducts. Engorgement most frequently occurs as milk "comes in" and during the weaning process. As milk is coming in, several processes occur. At the end of pregnancy, the blood vessels that supply the breast dilate, allowing for leaking into the tissue or interstitial space. Additionally, the birth of an infant is followed by massive fluid shifts to both offload excess fluid, which had been used to supply oxygen and nutrients to the fetus through the placenta, which is no longer needed, and supply additional fluid to the breasts to start the process of making milk. These fluid shifts often result in some of this excess fluid leaking into the breast tissue. Finally, milk "coming in" can create an uncomfortably full feeling, which, combined with the aforementioned fluid accumulation in the breast tissue, can cause severe pain. If breastfeeding is suddenly stopped, the breasts are likely to become engorged. Pumping small amounts to relieve discomfort helps to train the breasts to produce less milk gradually. There is presently no safe medication to prevent engorgement, but cold compresses and ibuprofen may help to relieve pain and swelling. Pain should go away with emptying of the breasts. If symptoms persist and comfort measures are not helpful, a blocked milk duct or infection may be present, and the affected person should seek medical intervention.

==== Nipple pain ====
Although very common, nipple pain and nipple trauma (cracking, open sores) should not be normalized, as these are often signs of a shallow latch or other underlying problem that can be evaluated and fixed. In addition to shallow latch, other causes of nipple pain include, but are not limited to, skin infection or inflammation, blood vessel spasm or the equivalent of Raynaud Syndrome in the breast, mastitis, plugged ducts, and nipple blebs. Pain caused by a problem deep in the breast may also present with nipple pain due to the paths of nerves in the breast. In addition to the serious nature of many of these causes, nipple pain is a common reason for a mother stopping breastfeeding, so mothers experiencing nipple pain must be evaluated.

==== Delay in milk "coming in" ====
While milk normally "comes in" by 3 days after birth, there are several reasons this may be delayed. Risk factors for this delay include maternal diabetes, stressful delivery, retained placenta, prolonged labor and birth by C-section. Mothers experiencing a delay in their milk coming in should consult with a lactation specialist and their pediatrician, as they may need to supplement with donor milk or formula to help the infant gain weight and pump to encourage milk to come in sooner and in greater volume.

==== Low milk supply ====
Breast milk supply increases in response to the baby's demand for milk and decreases when milk is allowed to remain in the breasts. When considering a possibly low milk supply, it is important to consider the difference between "perceived low milk supply" and "true low milk supply". Perceived low milk supply occurs when mothers, for a variety of reasons, believe that they are not making enough milk to feed their infant. These reasons may include fussiness, colic, preference for the bottle as opposed to the breast, long nursing duration, decreased sensation of breast fullness, and even decreased frequency of infant stools. However, in these cases, it is important to reassure the parent that infant weight gain is absolute proof of adequate milk intake. Thus, if the infant is breastfeeding exclusively and is gaining weight appropriately, then the parent can be reassured that they are producing enough milk.

True low milk supply can be either primary (caused by medical conditions or anatomical issues in the mother), secondary (caused by not thoroughly and regularly removing milk from the breasts), or both. Primary causes may manifest before or during pregnancy, during labor, and even after birth. Secondary causes are far more common than primary ones. One study found that 15% of healthy first-time mothers had low milk supply 2–3 weeks after birth, with secondary causes accounting for at least two-thirds of those cases.

Poor milk intake is signaled by poor infant weight gain, signs of dehydration, and hypoglycemia. Poor milk intake can be caused by poor milk transfer by the infant or by true low milk supply by the mother. When the milk "comes in" appropriately, but is followed by decreased milk supply, this is most often caused by allowing milk to remain in the breasts for long periods of time, or insufficiently draining the breasts during feeds. If the baby is latching and swallowing well (signs of good milk transfer), but is not gaining weight as expected or is showing signs of dehydration, low milk supply in the mother can be suspected, and a lactation specialist should be consulted.

==== Newborn jaundice ====
More than 80% of newborns develop jaundice within several days of birth. Jaundice, or yellowing of the skin and eyes, occurs when bilirubin, a byproduct of the breakdown/recycling of red blood cells, builds up in the newborn's bloodstream faster than the liver can break it down and excrete it through the baby's urine and stool. By continuing to breastfeed frequently (start at 8-12 times per day), the infant's body can usually rid itself of the bilirubin excess by encouraging more urine and stool production. However, in some cases, the infant may need additional treatments, such as UV light therapy or additional feedings (see Supplementation) to keep the condition from progressing into more severe problems.

There are two types of newborn jaundice related to breastfeeding.

Breastfeeding jaundice is quite common and may occur in the first week of life in conjunction with ongoing weight loss. The cause is thought to be low caloric intake. Formula-fed infants tend to lose less weight after birth compared to breastfed infants, supporting the hypothesis that breastfeeding jaundice is related to caloric intake rather than volume intake. Individual risk factors, such as breastfeeding, are not predictive of developing severe jaundice: Breastfeeding is a risk factor for severely high levels of bilirubin, but the risk factor is very common, and the risk of severely high bilirubin remains small.

Breast milk jaundice is jaundice that persists despite appropriate weight gain. This type of jaundice may start as breastfeeding jaundice and persist, or may not appear until after the baby has begun to gain weight, typically around 4–5 days old. It often persists beyond the second and third weeks of life. There is no single cause of breast milk jaundice; rather, the causes are multifactorial and frequently debated in the literature. The causes of breast milk jaundice include variations in bilirubin metabolism, genetic variations, and variations in breastmilk, including the harmless and helpful germs found naturally on the surface of the skin and in the breastmilk. Breast milk jaundice is usually not a reason to stop nursing. It is important to consult with a physician to determine when it may be necessary to test for other causes of jaundice that may require additional treatment, such as enzyme deficiencies or problems with the red blood cells (i.e., elliptocytosis, spherocytosis, hemolysis, glucose-6-phosphate dehydrogenase deficiency).

=== Weaning ===
Weaning is the process of replacing breast milk with other foods; the infant is fully weaned after the replacement is complete. Psychological factors affect the weaning process for both mother and infant, as issues of closeness and separation are very prominent. Unless a medical emergency necessitates abruptly stopping breastfeeding, it is best to gradually increase the period between feedings or eliminate feedings to allow the breasts to adjust to the decreased demands without becoming engorged. Studies show that a large number of women discontinue breastfeeding early due to lack of working place support for breastfeeding mothers. La Leche League advises parents to shift their children's focus at bedtime away from breastfeeding, as it is often the most difficult feeding for them to let go.

If weaning starts at 12 months or later, it is not necessary to switch to infant formula or "toddler formula" as is sold commercially. At 12 months, it is recommended that the baby be switched to whole cow's milk. Reduced-fat or skim milk generally is not appropriate before age 2 because it lacks sufficient fat or calories to promote early brain development.

If the mother was experiencing lactational amenorrhea, periods will begin to return with weaning, along with restored fertility.

=== Extended breastfeeding ===
Extended breastfeeding usually means breastfeeding beyond the age of 12 to 24 months, depending on the culture. The American Academy of Family Physicians states that "health outcomes for mothers and babies are best when breastfeeding continues for at least two years. The American Academy of Pediatrics recommends that mothers nurse for the first 12 months and "thereafter for as long as mother and baby desire." The World Health Organization recommends breastfeeding up to age 2 "or beyond."

Breast milk is known to contain lactoferrin (Lf), which protects the infant from infection caused by a wide range of pathogens. The amount of Lf in breast milk is lactation-stage related. One study evaluated Lf concentration in prolonged lactation from the first to the 48th month postpartum. It was found to be at the highest level in colostrum, dropped to the lowest level during 1 – 12 months of lactation, and then increased significantly during the 13–24 months of lactation, close to the Lf concentration in colostrum. At over 24 months, the level dropped, though not significantly.

=== Professional breastfeeding support ===
Lactation consultants are trained to assist mothers in preventing and solving breastfeeding difficulties such as sore nipples and low milk supply. They commonly work in hospitals, physician or midwife practices, public health programs, and private practice. Lactation consultants earn their credential, International Board Certified Lactation Consultant (IBCLC), through the International Board of Lactation Consultant Examiners.

Breastfeeding support from a lactation consultant is associated with higher rates of any breastfeeding at 6 months but not at 1 month or 3 months post pregnancy based on a meta-analysis of studies conducted in the US and Canada. Peer support for breastfeeding is associated with higher rates of any breastfeeding at 1 month and 3 to 6 months and of exclusive breastfeeding at 1 month, but it is unrelated to breastfeeding outcomes past 6 months post-pregnancy.

== Maternal diet and substance use ==
=== Diet ===
In addition to increased fluid intake, breastfeeding women need additional calories to support milk production. This is estimated to be upwards of 300 calories per day.

Mercury in fish is an important consideration for breastfeeding women. Though fish can be a good protein source, fish also contain mercury, which can be harmful. The concentration of mercury varies by fish species.

==== Alcohol ====
Moderate alcohol consumption, one standard drink per day, by breastfeeding mothers is not known to significantly affect infants; however, the American Academy of Pediatrics strongly discourages more than two standard drinks per day. Even one or two drinks, including beer, may reduce milk intake by 20 to 23%, leading to increased agitation and poor sleep patterns. Regular heavy drinking (more than two drinks daily) can shorten breastfeeding duration and cause issues in infants, such as excessive sedation, fluid retention, and hormonal imbalances. Additionally, higher alcohol consumption may negatively impact children's academic achievement.

When breastfeeding, alcohol may be consumed in moderation and does not require "Pumping-and-Dumping" (pumping and discarding breastmilk). Alcohol crosses from the blood to the breastmilk by diffusion. Thus, the concentration of alcohol in the breastmilk is approximately equal to the concentration in the maternal bloodstream at any given time. As the mother's liver processes the alcohol, more and more alcohol is pulled out of the breastmilk and back into the bloodstream. Thus, it is suggested to wait 2 hours after drinking before nursing or pumping. In the case of infrequent binge drinking, it has been shown that infants consume through breastmilk only a fraction of the alcohol their mothers have ingested. While a minute, clinically insignificant amount of alcohol may be absorbed into the infant's bloodstream, it is unlikely that this amount would cause any noticeable cognitive or neuromotor effects.

==== Recreational drugs ====
The data on the use of marijuana during breastfeeding is limited; however, in part due to our lack of knowledge in this area, the CDC recommends against using marijuana or marijuana-containing products, including CBD, during breastfeeding. The main active ingredient in marijuana, tetrahydrocannabinol (THC), can be found in breastmilk anywhere from six days to more than six weeks after marijuana use. There is limited data on the long term effects of this exposure on the infant, however some studies have voiced concern regarding delayed motor development in infants exposed to THC.

==== Tobacco ====
Mothers who smoke or use other tobacco products can breastfeed their infants, according to La Leche League, the CDC, and the Royal Women's Hospital (Australia). However, maternal tobacco use may decrease milk supply. Additionally, tobacco smoking, regardless of feeding method, increases risk of SIDS and respiratory illnesses. Thus, attempting to decrease tobacco use or even cease helps to minimize tobacco exposure to infants and maximize the benefits of breastfeeding. Tobacco cessation products, such as nicotine patches and other medications, like bupropion, are able to be used by breastfeeding mothers.

==== Other recreational drugs ====
Mothers utilizing recreational drugs, such as cocaine, methamphetamines, PCP, and heroin, should not breastfeed.

=== Medication use ===
Most medications are compatible with continued breastfeeding. Many medicines pass into breastmilk in small amounts; however, very few medications actually reach the infant and are absorbed in a way that would actually impact the infant. Several characteristics of medications, including size and pH of the medication molecule and how well the medication is absorbed in the GI tract, influence how much of a medication may reach, and may ultimately be absorbed, by the infant. In addition to the effects on the infant, many medications are known to significantly suppress milk production, including pseudoephedrine, diuretics, and contraceptives that contain estrogen.

There are several resources to assist medical professionals in determining which medications are safe for pregnancy and breastfeeding. While patients can use these resources, they are targeted toward medical professionals. Patients should be encouraged to consult a lactation specialist or a medical provider trained in breastfeeding medicine if any concerns arise. Two helpful resources are listed below.

1. LactMed @ NIH (Drugs and Lactation Database (LactMed))
2. InfantRisk App (InfantRisk Center at Texas Tech University Health Sciences Center)

==== Pumping-and-dumping ====
"Pumping-and-dumping" is the concept of expressing breastmilk and discarding it due to a medication or substance "tainting" the breastmilk. It was once believed that drinking alcohol or taking any medications, even medicines like ibuprofen, required pumping-and-dumping. However, this is no longer the case. Pumping-and-dumping, or stopping breastfeeding altogether, is only required in very rare circumstances, such as with radioactive medications or chemotherapy.

If a parent is concerned with a possible milk contaminant, they can express and save the breastmilk until they can consult with a lactation specialist or another medical professional trained in breastfeeding medicine.

== Contraindications to breastfeeding ==
=== Maternal contraindications ===
Medical conditions that do not allow breastfeeding are fairly rare. Infants that are otherwise healthy uniformly benefit from breastfeeding, however, extra precautions should be taken or breastfeeding avoided in circumstances including certain infectious diseases and medical conditions.

==== Maternal infections ====
===== HIV =====
A breastfeeding child can become infected with HIV. Factors such as the mother's viral load complicate breastfeeding recommendations for HIV-positive mothers. The World Health Organization highlights the possibility of breastfeeding in mothers on anti-viral therapy and with undetectable viral loads, especially in areas where access to clean water is poor and where death from infectious diseases is common, citing low transmission rates when the mother is on anti-viral therapy. They also recommend that national authorities in each country decide which infant feeding practice should be promoted by their maternal and child health services to avoid transmitting HIV from mother to child. However, the CDC continues to recommend against HIV-positive mothers breastfeeding in the United States. Infant formula should only be given if this can be safely done.

===== Human T-lymphotropic virus (types I and II) =====
Human T-Lymphotrophic Virus (HTLV) is able to be passed through breastmilk from mother to child. The worldwide rate of transmission through breastmilk is estimated to be 3.9–27%, and this risk is increased by high maternal viral load and prolonged periods of breastfeeding. Current data demonstrates that while breastfeeding for less than six months does not, independently, increase risk of HTLV-1 transmission, not breastfeeding during that time does decrease risk of transmission. As such, CDC recommends against breastfeeding when mothers have HTLV Types I or II. Recognizing the importance of breastfeeding in more resource-poor areas of the world, the World Health Organization recommends shortening the duration of breastfeeding, or avoiding breastfeeding where possible.

===== Hemorrhagic viral disease (Marburg virus, Ebola) =====
Mothers with Marburg virus or Ebola should not breastfeed their infants or feed them with expressed breastmilk.

===== Tuberculosis =====
Infants whose mothers have suspected untreated tuberculosis (TB) should be isolated from their mothers to reduce the risk of transmission. As such, these infants should not be breastfed during this time and until the mother has been treated appropriately for 2 weeks and is no longer contagious. However, these infants may be fed expressed breastmilk from their mother. Transmission of TB through breastmilk, without an isolated breast infection caused by the Tuberculosis bacteria (Mycobacterium tuberculosis), has never been documented in the scientific literature. Mothers who do have an isolated breast infection caused by Mycobacterium tuberculosis, termed tuberculous mastitis, should not feed their infants with their own breastmilk, even if it is fed by bottle.

===== Herpes simplex =====
Herpes simplex virus (HSV) is the virus that causes genital herpes and oral cold sores, and it can be very dangerous to infants. The CDC advises to continue breastfeeding if there are no open/active lesions on the breast and other lesions covered.

===== Herpes zoster (chickenpox and shingles) =====
Varicella zoster is the virus responsible for chickenpox and shingles (also known as herpes zoster). The CDC advises that breastfeeding is safe to continue as long as the breasts are clear of lesions, also emphasizing that if pumping or hand expressing milk, proper hand-hygiene should be used to minimize transfer.

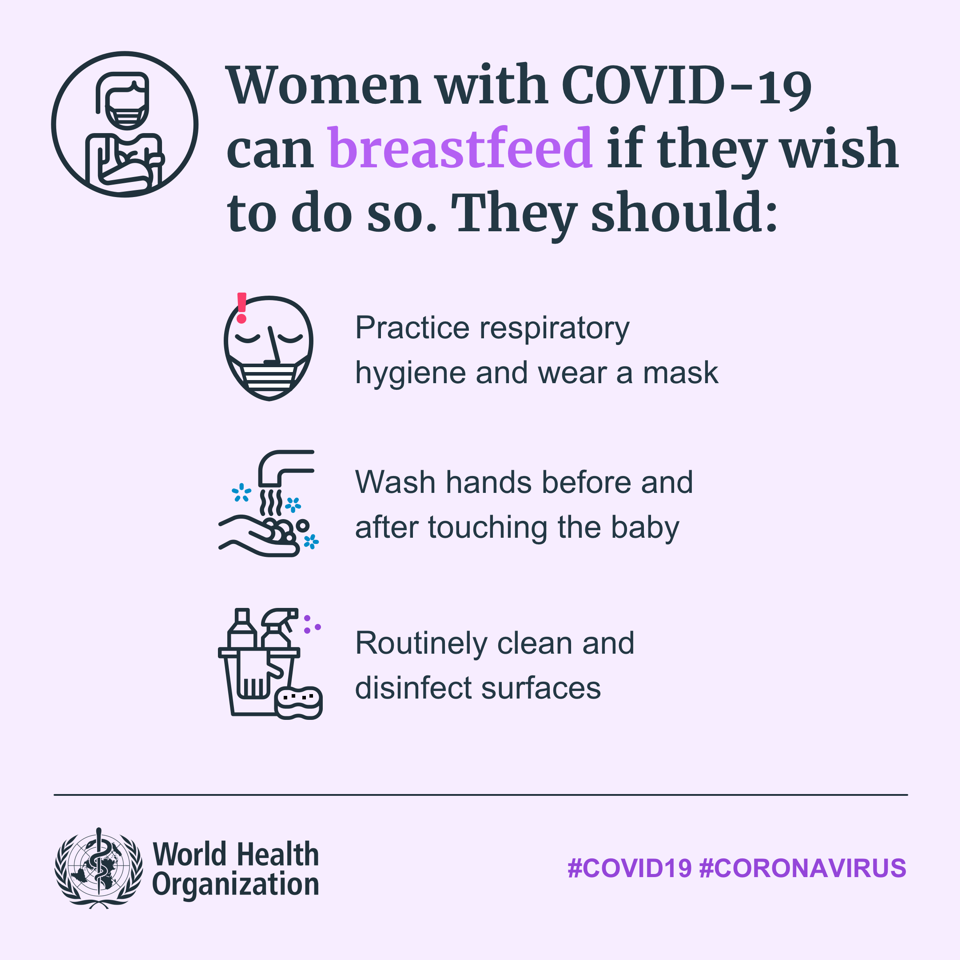
An infographic from the World Health Organization on COVID-19 preventive measures to be taken while breastfeeding

===== COVID-19 (no contraindication) =====
In May 2020, WHO and UNICEF stressed that the ongoing COVID-19 pandemic was not a reason to discontinue breastfeeding. They recommend that women continue to breastfeed during the pandemic, even if they have confirmed or suspected COVID-19, because evidence indicates that it is unlikely that COVID-19 can be transmitted through breast milk. A study published in 2021 found that, while SARS-CoV-2 RNA may be found in some samples of breastmilk from recently infected mothers, the breastmilk does not contain infectious virus and is not considered a transmission risk factor. Mothers who have suspected or confirmed diagnoses of COVID-19 should thoroughly wash their hands and wear a well-fitting mask before breastfeeding their infant, or express breastmilk and feed the infant by bottle.

=== Infantile contraindications ===
==== Galactosemia ====
Galactosemia is a metabolic disorder that prevents the infant from breaking down galactose, which is one of the two components of lactose, a type of sugar found in milk. Lactose is also found in breastmilk, so infants with galactosemia should not breastfeed.

== Methods ==
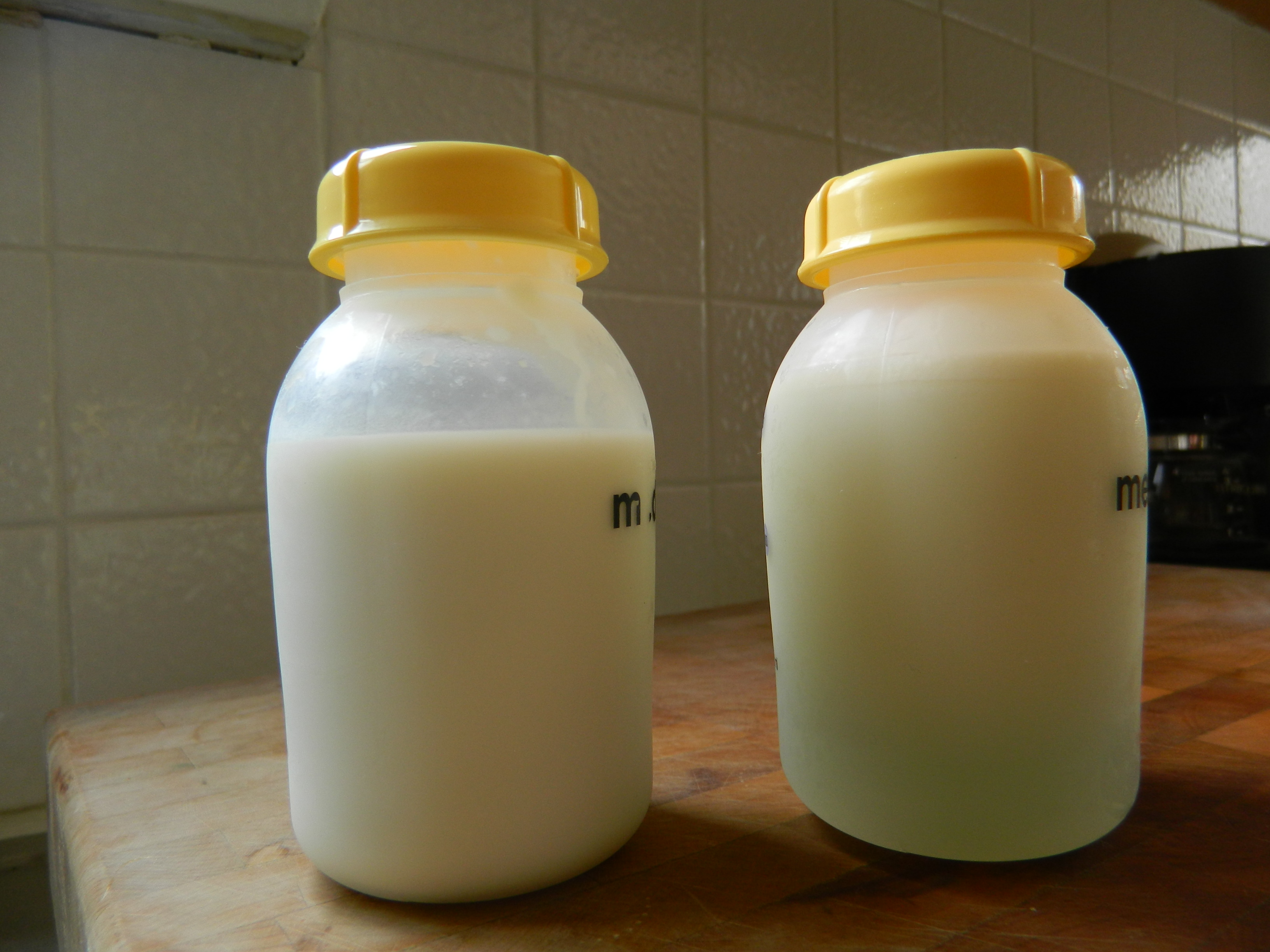
Formula and pumped breastmilk side by side. Note that the formula is of uniform consistency and color, while the expressed breast milk exhibits properties of an organic solution by separating into a layer of fat at the top (the "creamline"), followed by the milk, and then a watery blue-colored layer at the bottom.

=== Expressed milk ===
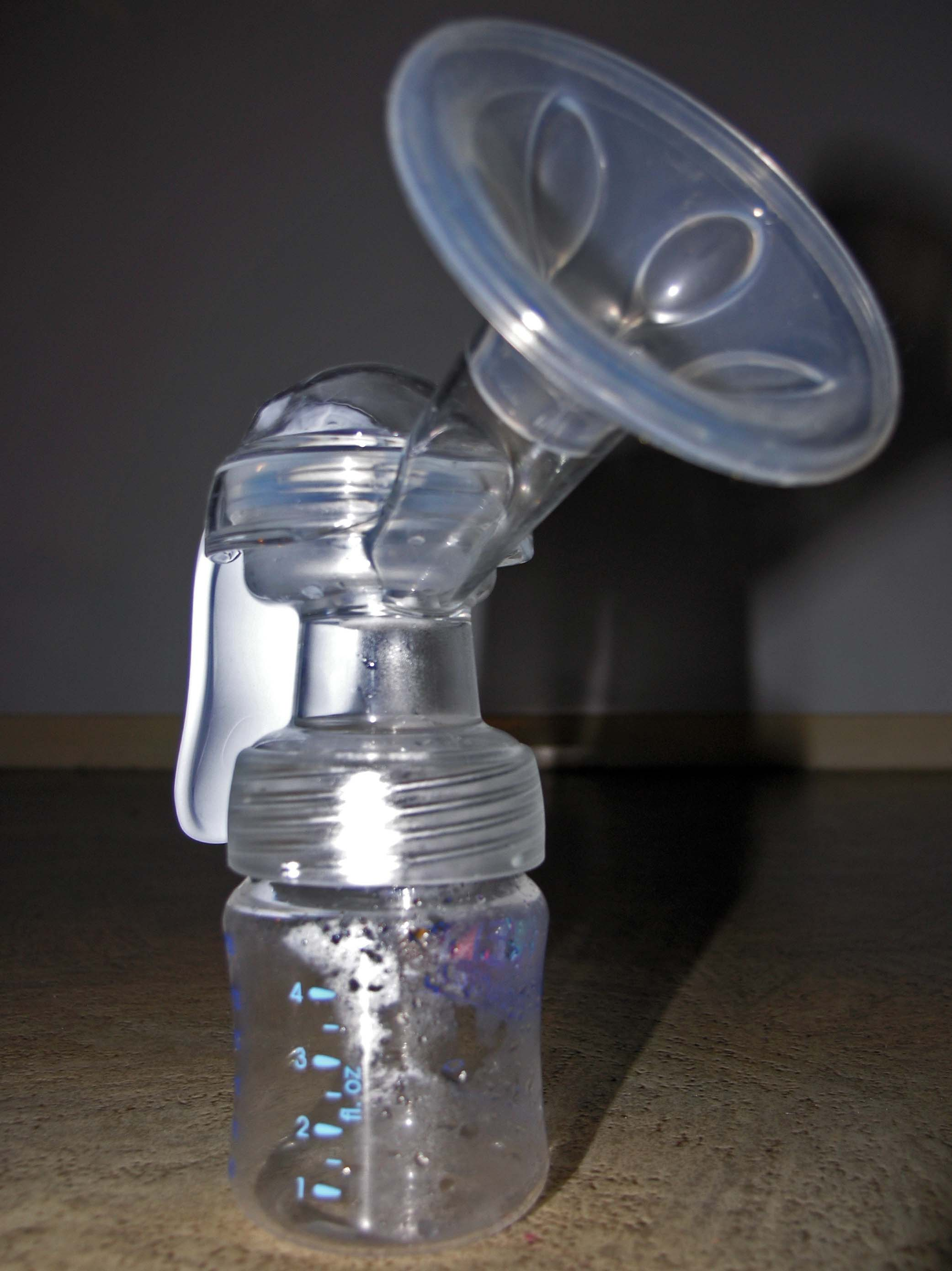
Manual breast pump

A mother may express milk (remove milk from breasts) for storage and later use. Expression may occur manually with hand expression or by using a breast pump.

Mothers express milk for multiple reasons. Expressing breast milk can maintain a mother's milk supply when mother and child are apart. A sick baby who is unable to nurse can take expressed milk through a nasogastric tube. Some babies are unable or unwilling to nurse. Maternal breastmilk is the food of choice for premature babies; these infants may be fed maternal milk through tubes, supplemental nursing systems, bottles, spoons, or cups until they develop satisfactory ability to suck and swallow breast milk. Some women donate expressed breast milk (EBM) to others, either directly or through a milk bank. This allows mothers who cannot breastfeed to give their baby the benefits of breast milk. While informally-shared breastmilk does carry the nutritional benefits of breastmilk, this breastmilk is most often not pasteurized or screened, and thus carries with it the risk of transmitting diseases or medications that are unsafe for infants. Parents considering directed or informal milk sharing should discuss this option with their doctor, and they should be familiar with the donor's medical history and milk handling practices. Use of informally-shared (unscreened, not pasteurized) milk from an anonymous donor is discouraged by the Academy of Breastfeeding Medicine.

Babies feed differently with artificial nipples than from a breast. With the breast, the infant's tongue massages the milk out rather than sucking, and the nipple does not go as far into the mouth. Drinking from a bottle takes less effort, and the milk may come more quickly, potentially causing the baby to lose desire for the breast. This is often referred to as nipple confusion or nipple preference. While some infants do experience this preference for the bottle, many infants do not and will be able to alternate between bottle and breast without issue.

"Exclusively expressing" and "exclusively pumping" are terms for a mother who exclusively feeds a baby expressed milk. Exclusively pumping is poorly studied in the literature, especially in recent years. However, from available evidence, it appears fairly uncommon, with only approximately 7% of study participants reporting exclusive pumping.

==== Storage of expressed breastmilk ====
Breastmilk may be stored for various amounts of time depending on storage temperature and conditions. The content and quality of expressed milk change over time as it is stored, particularly when frozen. For example, there is a decrease in the ability of breastmilk to kill bacteria when it is stored in the refrigerator for more than 48 hours. Additionally, the quantity of fat, protein, and calories in breastmilk decreases when the milk is frozen for more than 3 months. While several components of breastmilk change over time, inflammatory factors (cytokines) and maternal antibodies, and growth factors are thought to be stable for at least 6 months when the breastmilk is frozen. Storage guidelines, according to the CDC, La Leche League International and the Academy of Breastfeeding Medicine, are noted in the table below.

Storage of Expressed Breastmilk
Storage Location	Optimal Storage Time	Acceptable Storage Time	Source
Countertop	4 hours	8 hours	
Insulated bag with icepack	24 hours		
Refrigerator	4 days	5 days	
Freezer compartment of minifridge	2 weeks		
Standard Freezer	6 months	12 months	
Deep Freezer (usually separate from refrigerator)	6–12 months		

==== Breastmilk storage containers ====
Expressed breastmilk can be stored in freezer storage bags, containers made specifically for breastmilk, a supplemental nursing system, or a bottle ready for use. Parents should avoid using storage containers which contain bisphenol A (BPA). Additionally, use of polyethylene containers have been shown to decrease the immune benefits of breastmilk, including its ability to kill bacteria and the maternal antibodies it contains, by up to 60%.

=== Shared nursing ===
It is not only a mother who may breastfeed a child. Parents may hire another person to do so (a wet nurse), or may share childcare with another mother (cross-nursing). Both of these were common throughout history. It remains popular in some developing nations, including those in Africa, for more than one woman to breastfeed a child. Shared breastfeeding is a risk factor for HIV infection in infants. Shared nursing can sometimes provoke negative social reactions in the English-speaking world.

=== Tandem nursing ===
A mother can continue breastfeeding an older sibling while also breastfeeding a new baby; this is called tandem nursing. During the late stages of pregnancy, the milk changes to colostrum. While some children continue to breastfeed even with this change, others may wean. Most mothers can produce enough milk for tandem nursing, but the new baby should be nursed first for at least the first few days after delivery to ensure it receives enough colostrum.

Breastfeeding triplets or larger broods is a challenge given babies' varying appetites. Breasts can respond to the demand and produce larger milk quantities; mothers have breastfed triplets successfully.

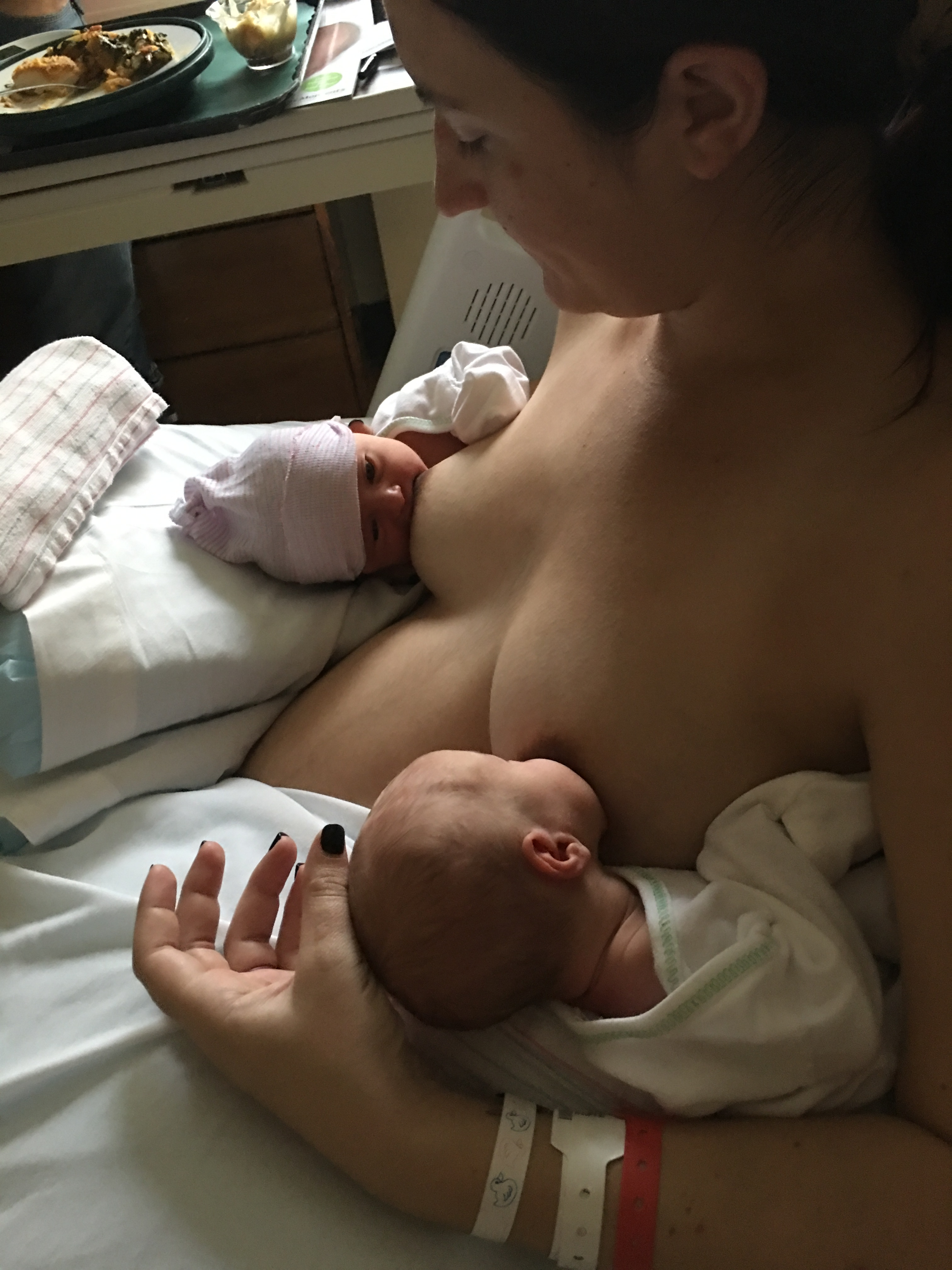
Newborn twins being breastfed

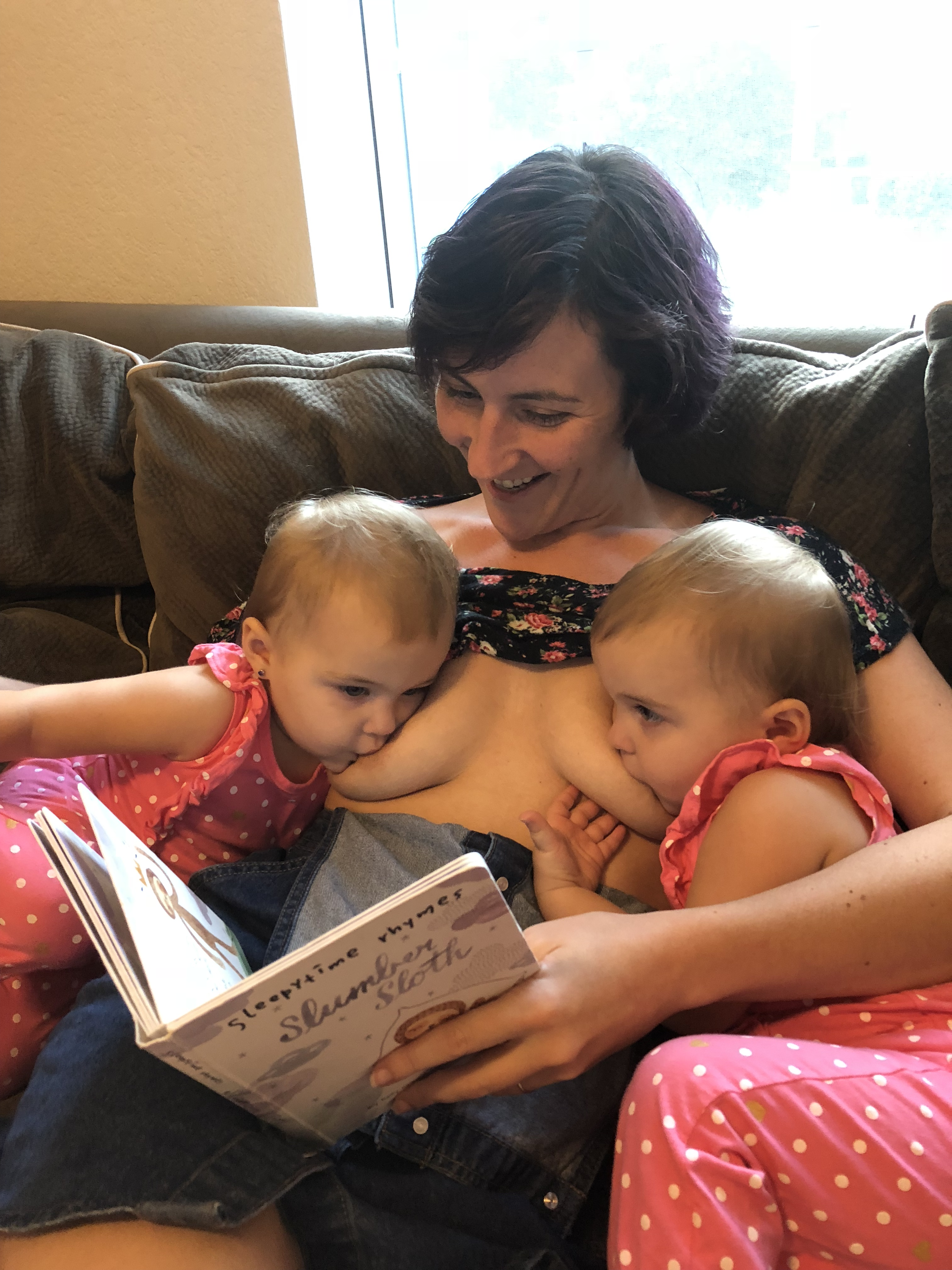
Woman breastfeeds 2-year-old twins whilst reading them a book.

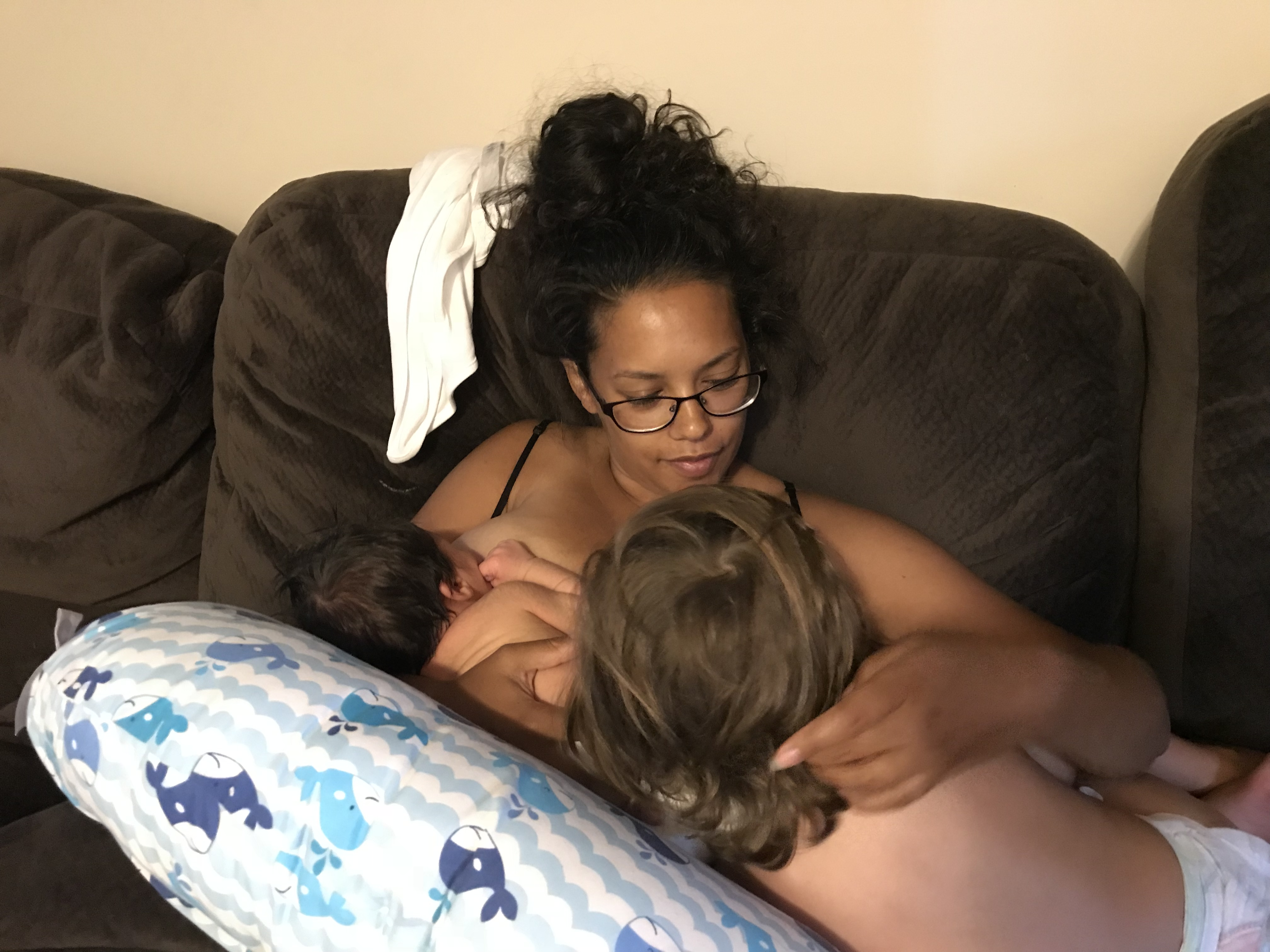
Woman tandem nurses an infant and a toddler.

=== Re-lactation and induced lactation ===
Re-lactation is the process of restarting breastfeeding. In developing countries, mothers may restart breastfeeding after a weaning as part of an oral rehydration treatment for diarrhea. In developed countries, re-lactation is common after early medical problems are resolved, or because a mother changes her mind about breastfeeding.

Re-lactation is most easily accomplished with a newborn or with a baby that was previously breastfeeding; if the baby was initially bottle-fed, the baby may refuse to suckle. If the mother has recently stopped breastfeeding, chances are higher that the milk supply will return and be adequate. Although some mothers successfully re-lactate after months-long interruptions, success is higher for shorter interruptions.

Techniques to promote lactation include frequent attempts to breastfeed, extensive skin-to-skin contact with the baby, and frequent, long pumping sessions. Suckling may be encouraged with a tube filled with infant formula, so that the baby associates suckling at the breast with food. A dropper or syringe without the needle may be used to place milk onto the breast while the baby suckles. The mother should allow the infant to suckle at least ten times during 24 hours, and more times if the baby is interested. These times can include every two hours, whenever the baby seems interested, longer at each breast, and when the baby is sleepy, when they might suckle more readily. In keeping with increasing contact between mother and child, including increasing skin-to-skin contact, grandmothers should pull back and help in other ways. Later on, grandmothers can again provide more direct care for the infant.

These techniques require the mother's commitment over a period of weeks or months. However, even when lactation is established, the supply may not be large enough to breastfeed exclusively. A supportive social environment improves the likelihood of success. As the mother's milk production increases, other feeding can decrease. Parents and other family members should watch the baby's weight gain and urine output to assess nutritional adequacy.

A WHO manual for physicians and senior health workers, citing a 1992 source, states: "If a baby has been breastfeeding sometimes, the breastmilk supply increases in a few days. If a baby has stopped breastfeeding, it may take 1–2 weeks or more before much breastmilk comes."

Induced lactation, also called adoptive lactation, is the process of starting breastfeeding in a woman who did not give birth. This usually requires the adoptive mother to take hormones and other drugs to stimulate breast development and promote milk production. In some cultures, breastfeeding an adoptive child creates milk kinship that builds community bonds across class and other hierarchical bonds.

== Health effects ==
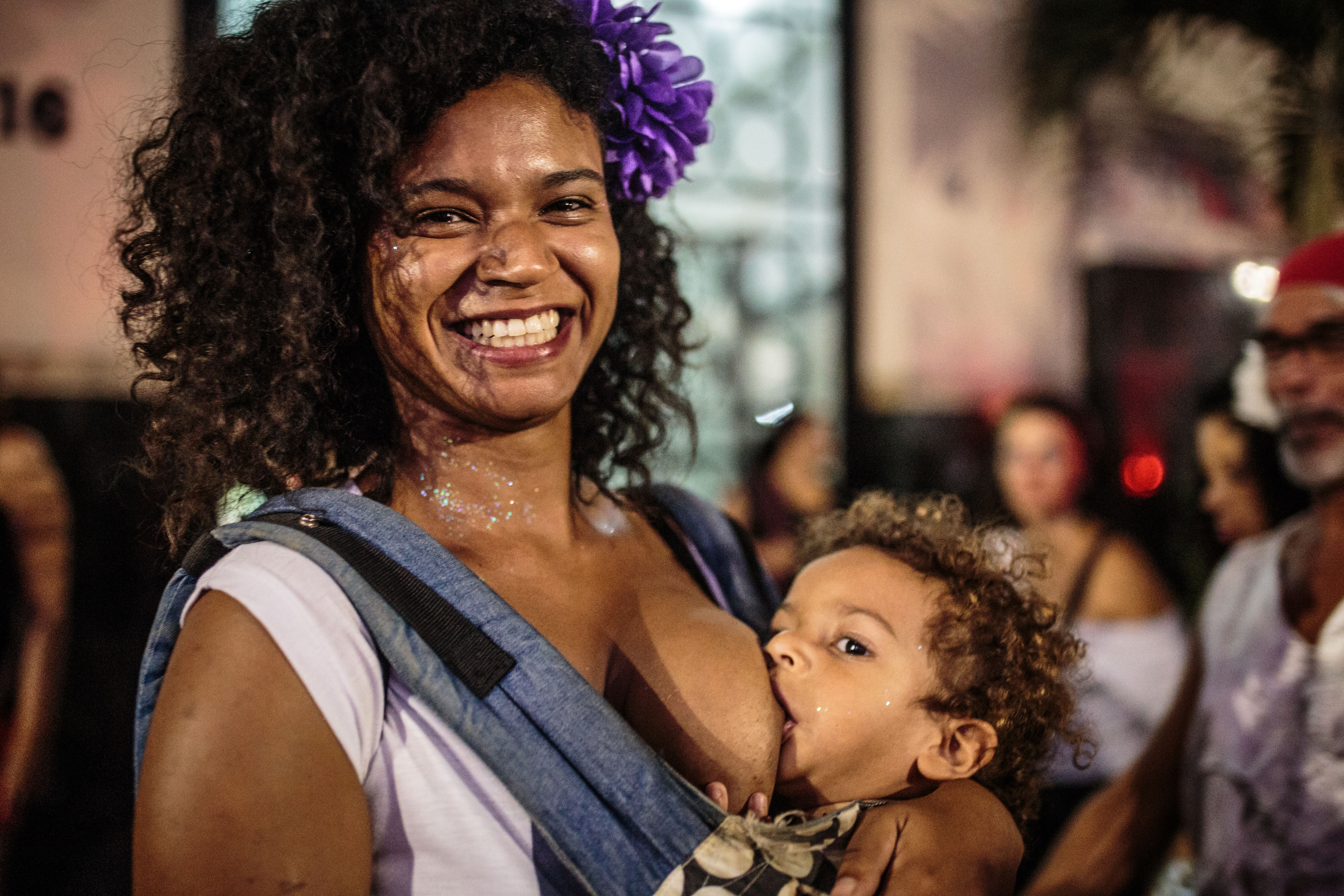
A mother using a baby carrier to support a feeding baby in Rio de Janeiro

Breastfeeding support is universal among major health and children's organizations. WHO states, "Breast milk is the ideal food for the healthy growth and development of infants; breastfeeding is also an integral part of the reproductive process with important implications for the health of mothers."

Breastfeeding is associated with a lowered risk of several diseases in both mothers and babies. Comparing infants that were exclusively breastfed for at least 3 months with never-breastfed infants, the American Academy of Pediatrics reported that in the first year of life breastfed babies averaged about $400 in savings of health care costs.

=== Baby ===
Infants who are not breastfed are at mildly increased risk of developing lower respiratory infection, ear infections, bacteremia, bacterial meningitis, botulism, urinary tract infection and necrotizing enterocolitis. Breastfeeding may protect against sudden infant death syndrome, insulin-dependent diabetes mellitus, Crohn's disease, ulcerative colitis, childhood lymphoma, allergic diseases, digestive diseases, obesity, and childhood leukemia. It is hard however to distinguish the importance of breastfeeding per se and other correlated socioeconomic factors (breastfeeding is more frequent in richer families with higher educations). Comparing breastfed and non-breastfed siblings in a given family drastically decreases the association between breastfeeding and long-term child well-being.

==== Growth ====
The average breastfed baby doubles its birth weight in 5–6 months. By one year, a typical breastfed baby weighs about 2 1/2 times its birth weight. At one year, breastfed babies tend to be leaner than formula-fed babies, which improves long-term health.

The Davis Area Research on Lactation, Infant Nutrition and Growth (DARLING) study reported that breastfed and formula-fed groups had similar weight gain during the first 3 months. Breastfed babies began to drop below the median beginning at 6 to 8 months and were significantly lower in weight than the formula-fed group between 6 and 18 months. Length gain and head circumference values were similar between groups, suggesting that the breastfed babies were leaner.

==== Infections ====
Breast milk contains several anti-infective factors such as bile salt stimulated lipase (protecting against amoebic infections) and lactoferrin (which binds to iron and inhibits the growth of intestinal bacteria).

Exclusive breastfeeding until six months of age helps to protect an infant from gastrointestinal infections in both developing and industrialized countries. The risk of death due to diarrhea and other infections increases when babies are either partially breastfed or not breastfed at all. Infants who are exclusively breastfed for the first six months are less likely to die of gastrointestinal infections than infants who switched from exclusive to partial breastfeeding at three to four months.

During breastfeeding, approximately 0.25–0.5 grams per day of secretory IgA antibodies pass to the baby via milk. This is one of the important features of colostrum. The main target for these antibodies are probably microorganisms in the baby's intestine. The rest of the body displays some uptake of IgA, but this amount is relatively small.

Maternal vaccinations while breastfeeding are safe for almost all vaccines. Additionally, the mother's immunity obtained by vaccination against tetanus, diphtheria, whooping cough, and influenza can protect the baby from these diseases, and breastfeeding can reduce the fever rate after infant immunization. However, smallpox and yellow fever vaccines increase the risk of infants developing vaccinia and encephalitis.

Several studies have suggested that breast milk can pass antibodies to the infant for as long as the child continues to nurse. The antibodies may be in the mother's system as a result of being ill, or they may be acquired by drinking milk from a mother who has recently been vaccinated for a particular disease. One small study done on nursing mothers who had received the COVID-19 vaccine found that breastmilk continued to contain antibodies for as long as 80 days after receiving the vaccine.

==== Mortality ====
The World Health Organization reports that babies who receive no breast milk are almost six times more likely to die by the age of one month than those who are partially or fully breastfed. Access to healthcare is the single critical determinant of survival or death for the infant.

==== Childhood obesity ====
The protective effect of breastfeeding against obesity is consistent, though small, across many studies. A 2013 longitudinal study reported less obesity at ages two and four years among infants who were breastfed for at least four months.

==== Allergic diseases ====
In children who are at risk for developing allergic diseases (defined as at least one parent or sibling having atopy), atopic syndrome can be prevented or delayed through 4-month exclusive breastfeeding, though these benefits may not persist.

==== Backwash effect ====
The backwash effect in breastfeeding refers to the process in which an infant's saliva flows back into the mother's breast during nursing. This backward flow may introduce the baby's saliva into the mammary gland, potentially prompting the mother's body to produce tailored immune responses in her breast milk to meet the infant's specific needs.

==== Other health effects ====
Breastfeeding may reduce the risk of necrotizing enterocolitis (NEC) in premature babies.

Breastfeeding or introduction of gluten while breastfeeding does not protect against celiac disease among at-risk children. Breast milk of healthy human mothers who eat gluten-containing foods presents high levels of non-degraded gliadin (the main gluten protein). Early introduction of traces of gluten in babies to potentially induce tolerance does not reduce the risk of developing celiac disease. Delaying the introduction of gluten does not prevent, but is associated with a delayed onset of the disease.

About 14 to 19 percent of leukemia cases may be prevented by breastfeeding for six months or longer. However, breastfeeding is also the primary cause of adult T-cell leukemia/lymphoma, as the HTLV-1 virus is transmitted through breastmilk.

Breastfeeding is associated with a lower chance of developing diabetes mellitus type 1 in the offspring. Breastfed babies also appear to have a lower likelihood of developing diabetes mellitus type 2 later in life.

Breastfeeding may decrease the risk of cardiovascular disease in later life, as indicated by lower cholesterol and C-reactive protein levels in breastfed adult women. Breastfed infants have somewhat lower blood pressure later in life, but it is unclear how much practical benefit this provides.

A 1998 study suggested that breastfed babies have a better chance of good dental health than formula-fed infants because of the developmental effects of breastfeeding on the oral cavity and airway. It was thought that with fewer malocclusions, breastfed children may have a reduced need for orthodontic intervention. The report suggested that children with a well-rounded, "U-shaped" dental arch, which is found more commonly in breastfed children, may have fewer problems with snoring and sleep apnea in later life. A 2016 review found that breastfeeding protected against malocclusions.

Breastfeeding duration has been correlated with child maltreatment outcomes, including neglect and sexual abuse.

==== Intelligence ====
It is unclear whether breastfeeding improves intelligence later in life. Several studies found no relationship after controlling for confounding factors like maternal intelligence (smarter mothers were more likely to breastfeed their babies). However, other studies concluded that breastfeeding was associated with increased cognitive development in childhood, although the cause may be increased mother–child interaction rather than nutrition.

=== Mother ===
==== Maternal bond ====
Oxytocin, a hormone released during breastfeeding, may play a role in maternal-infant attachment and bonding, potentially via decreased anxiety and stress.

==== Fertility ====
Exclusive breastfeeding usually delays the return of fertility through lactational amenorrhea, although it does not provide reliable birth control. Mothers may not ovulate or have regular periods during the entire lactation period. The non-ovulating period varies by individual. This has been used as natural contraception, with greater than 98% effectiveness during the first six months after birth if specific nursing behaviors are followed.

==== Postpartum bleeding ====
During the third stage of labor, the time between the delivery of the baby and the passage of the placenta, and the fourth, the final stage of birth, excessive blood loss can endanger the life of the mother. When the newborn nurses, the mother secretes oxytocin, which causes the uterus to contract and reduce blood loss. Nursing also causes the uterus to cramp for several days postpartum, helping it to return to its pre-pregnancy size. Some women report moderate to severe pain, especially women who have given birth several times, during a nursing session for the first few days following delivery.

==== Weight retention ====
It is unclear whether breastfeeding causes mothers to lose weight after giving birth. The National Institutes of Health states that it may help with weight loss.

==== Chronic conditions ====
Breastfeeding is also associated with a lower risk of type 2 diabetes among mothers who practice it. Longer duration of breastfeeding is associated with reduced risk of hypertension.

For breastfeeding women, long-term health benefits include reduced risk of breast cancer, ovarian cancer, and endometrial cancer. According to the American Heart Association, breastfeeding also reduces the risk of maternal heart disease and stroke.

A 2011 review found it unclear whether breastfeeding affects the risk of postpartum depression. Later reviews have found tentative evidence of a lower risk among mothers who successfully breastfeed, though it is unknown whether breastfeeding decreases depression, or whether depression decreases breastfeeding.

==== Dysphoric milk ejection reflex ====
Dysphoric milk ejection reflex (D-MER) is a condition in which breastfeeding women develop negative emotions that begin just before the milk letdown reflex and last less than a few minutes. It may recur with every letdown, including unexpected letdowns when the baby is not feeding. It presents as an emotional reaction but may also produce physical feelings such as nausea. It is different from postpartum depression and other known psychological conditions. A 2019 study reported a prevalence rate of 9.1%. As of 2021, very little research has been done, and many health care providers and lactation practitioners remain barely able to recognize the syndrome. An October 2021 review of literature published to that date suggested that the lack of up-to-date information "makes it necessary to educate mothers because educated mothers are usually better at handling postpartum situations if they are prepared in advance." There is as yet no medication to treat the symptoms although women have reported that they have found it of benefit to learn that they are not alone and that the symptoms were not "just in their head".

== Social factors ==
The majority of mothers intend to breastfeed at birth. Many factors can disrupt this intent. Research done in the US shows that obstetricians rarely provide information about breastfeeding during their prenatal visits, and some health professionals incorrectly believe that commercially prepared formula is nutritionally equivalent to breast milk. Many hospitals have instituted practices that encourage breastfeeding, however a 2012 survey in the US found that 24% of maternity services were still providing supplements of commercial infant formula as a general practice in the first 48 hours after birth. The Surgeon General's Call to Action to Support Breastfeeding attempts to educate practitioners.

=== Social support ===
A review found that when effective forms of support are offered to women, exclusive breastfeeding and duration of breastfeeding are increased. Characteristics of effective support include ongoing, face-to-face support tailored to fit their needs. It may be offered by lay/peer supporters, professional supporters, or a combination of both. This review contrasts with another large review that looked at education programs alone, which found no conclusive evidence of initiation of breastfeeding or the proportion of women breastfeeding either exclusively or partially at 3 months and 6 months.

Positive social support in essential relationships of new mothers plays a central role in promoting breastfeeding outside of medical centers. Social support can come in many incarnations, including tangible, affectionate, social interactions, and emotional and informational support. An increase in these capacities of support has shown to greatly positively effect breastfeeding rates, especially among women with education below a high school level. Some mothers who have used lactation rooms have taken to leaving sticky notes to not only thank the businesses that have provided them but to support, encourage, and praise the nursing mothers who use them.

In the social circles surrounding the mother, support is most crucial from the male partner, the mother's mother, and her family and friends. Research has shown that the closest relationships to the mother have the strongest impact on breastfeeding rates, while negative perspectives on breastfeeding from close relatives hinder its prevalence.

- Mother – Adolescence is a risk factor for low breastfeeding rates, although classes, books, and personal counseling (professional or lay) can help compensate. Some women fear that breastfeeding will negatively impact the look of their breasts. However, a 2008 study found that breastfeeding did not affect the breasts; other factors did contribute to "drooping" of the breasts, such as advanced age, number of pregnancies, and smoking behavior.
- Partner – Partners may lack knowledge of breastfeeding and their role in the practice.
- Wet nursing – Social and cultural attitudes towards breastfeeding in the African-American community are also influenced by the legacy of forced wet-nursing during slavery.

==== Maternity leave ====
Work is the most commonly cited reason for not breastfeeding. In 2012, Save the Children examined maternity leave laws, ranking 36 industrialized countries according to their support for breastfeeding. Norway ranked first, while the United States came in last. Maternity leave in the US varies widely, including by state. The United States does not mandate paid maternity leave for any employee; however, the Family Medical Leave Act (FMLA) guarantees qualifying mothers up to 12 weeks of unpaid leave, although most US mothers resume work earlier. A large 2011 study found that women who returned to work at or after 13 weeks after childbirth were more likely to breastfeed beyond three months.

=== Healthcare ===
==== Caesarean section ====
Women are less likely to start breastfeeding after caesarean delivery compared with vaginal delivery. Though the stress of a caesarean section (c-section) may impact let-down and flow, and though time for recovery immediately after surgery may be needed, women who give birth via c-section are still able to breastfeed. Generally, the benefits of breastfeeding outweigh the harms posed by pain medications following surgery. Mothers may need to experiment with different breastfeeding positions to avoid putting pressure on the incision.

==== Breast surgery ====
Breastfeeding can generally be attempted after breast augmentation or reduction surgery; however, prior breast surgery is a risk factor for low milk supply.

A 2014 review found that women who have breast implant surgery were less likely to breastfeed exclusively; however, it was based on only three small studies, and the reasons for the correlation were not clear. A large follow-up study done in 2014 found a reduced rate of breastfeeding in women who had undergone breast augmentation surgery; however, again, the reasons were unclear. The authors suggested that women contemplating augmentation should be provided with information related to the rates of successful breastfeeding as part of informed decision-making when contemplating surgery.

Prior breast reduction surgery is strongly associated with an increased probability of low milk supply due to disruption to tissues and nerves. Some surgical techniques for breast reduction appear to be more successful than others in preserving the tissues that generate and channel milk to the nipple. A 2017 review found that women were more likely to have success with breastfeeding with these techniques.

==== Medications ====
Breastfeeding mothers should inform their healthcare provider about all of the medications they are taking, including herbal products. Nursing mothers may be immunized and may take most over-the-counter drugs and prescription drugs without risk to the baby but certain drugs, including some painkillers and some psychiatric drugs, may pose a risk.

The US National Library of Medicine publishes "LactMed," an up-to-date online database of information on drugs and lactation. Geared to both healthcare practitioners and nursing mothers, LactMed contains over 450 drug records with information such as potential drug effects and alternative drugs to consider.

Some substances in the mother's food and drink are passed to the baby through breast milk, including mercury (found in some carnivorous fish), caffeine, and bisphenol A.

==== Medical conditions ====
Undiagnosed maternal celiac disease may cause a short duration of the breastfeeding period. Treatment with the gluten-free diet can increase its duration and restore it to the average value of the healthy women.

Mothers with all types of diabetes mellitus normally use insulin to control their blood sugar, as the safety of other antidiabetic drugs while breastfeeding is unknown.

Women with polyendocrine metabolic ovarian syndrome (PMOS), which is associated with some hormonal differences and obesity, may have greater difficulty with producing a sufficient supply to support exclusive breastfeeding, especially during the first weeks.

=== Ethnicity and socioeconomic status ===
The rates of breastfeeding in the African-American community remain much lower than those of any other race, for a variety of proposed reasons. These include the legacy of wet nursing during slavery, higher rates of poor perinatal health, higher stress levels, less access to support, and less flexibility in the workplace. While for other races, as socio-economic status increases, rates of breastfeeding also go up, for the African-American community, breastfeeding rates remain consistently low regardless of socio-economic class.

There are also racial disparities in access to maternity care practices that support breastfeeding. In the US, primarily African-American neighborhoods are more likely to have facilities (such as hospitals and female healthcare clinics) that do not support breastfeeding, contributing to the low rate of breastfeeding in the African-American community. Comparing facilities in primarily African American neighborhoods to ones in primarily European-American neighborhoods, the rates of practices that support or discourage breastfeeding were: limited use of supplements (13.1% compared with 25.8%) and rooming-in (27.7–39.4%)

Low-income mothers are more likely to have unintended pregnancies. Mothers whose pregnancies are unintended are less likely to breastfeed.

Especially the combination of powdered formula with unclean water can be very harmful to the health of babies. In the late 1970s, there was a boycott against Nestle due to the large number of baby deaths due to formula. Dr. Michele Barry explains that breastfeeding is most imperative in poverty environments due to the lack of access to clean water for formula. A Lancet study in 2016 found that universal breastfeeding would prevent the deaths of 800,000 children as well as save $300,000,000.

=== Social acceptance ===
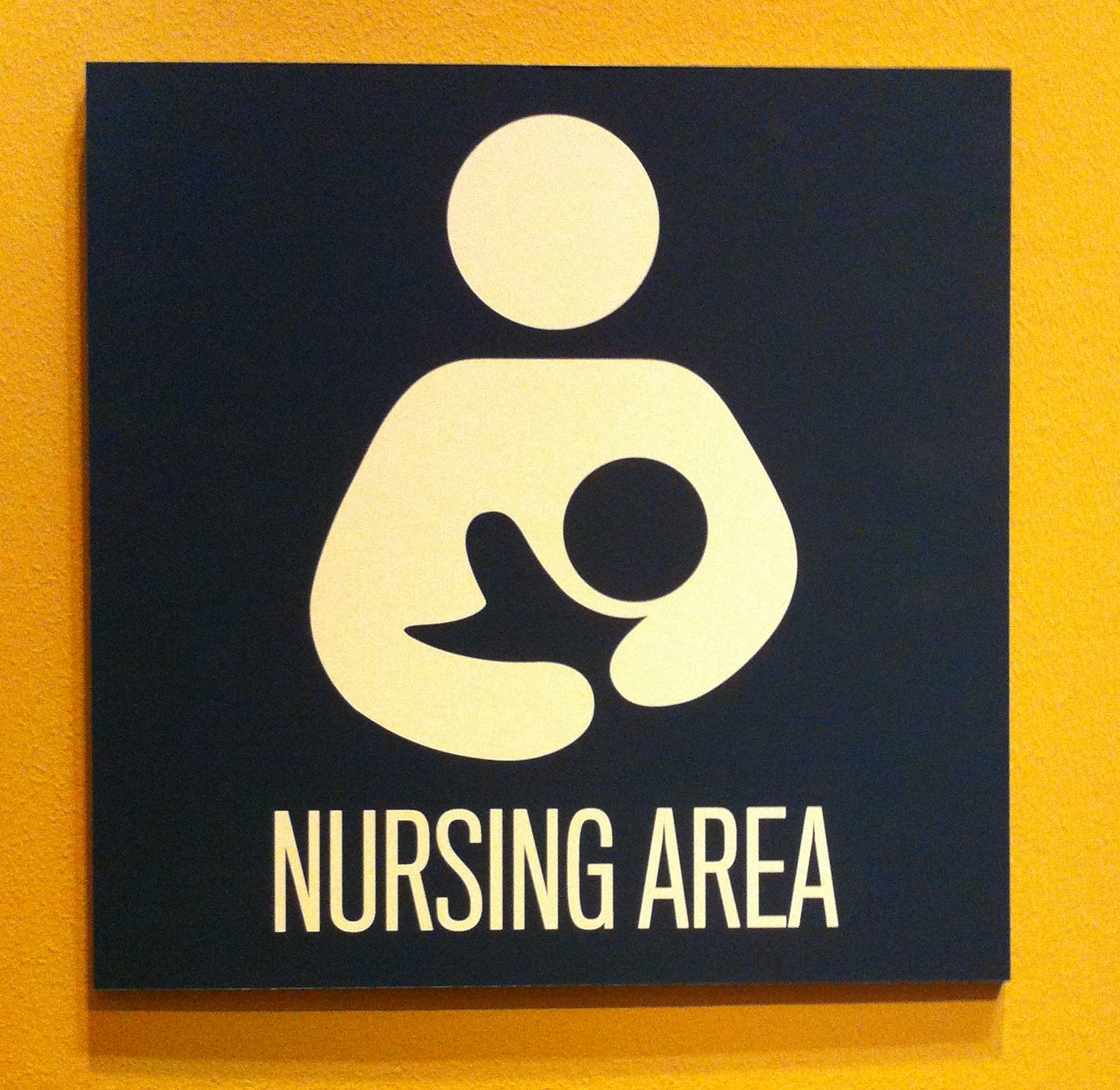
Sign for a private nursing area at a museum using the international breastfeeding symbol

Some women feel discomfort when breastfeeding in public. Public breastfeeding may be forbidden in some places, not addressed by law in others, and a legal right in others. Even given a legal right, some mothers are reluctant to breastfeed, while others may object to the practice.

It is estimated that around 63% of mothers worldwide have publicly breastfed. The media have reported several incidents in which workers or members of the public have objected to or forbidden women breastfeeding. Some mothers avoid the negative attention and choose to move to another location. But some mothers have protested their treatment and have taken legal action or engaged in protests. Protests have included a public boycott of the offender's business, organizing a "nurse-in" or a breastfeeding flash mob, in which groups of nursing mothers gather at the location where the complaint originated and nursed their babies at the same time. In response, some companies have apologised and instituted reforms.

The use of infant formula was thought to be a way for Western culture to adapt to negative perceptions of breastfeeding. The breast pump offered a way for mothers to supply breast milk with most of formula feeding's convenience and without enduring possible disapproval of nursing. Some may object to breastfeeding because of the implicit association between infant feeding and sex. These negative cultural connotations may reduce breastfeeding duration. Maternal guilt and shame are often affected by how a mother feeds an infant. These emotions occur in both bottle- and breast-feeding mothers, although for different reasons. Bottle-feeding mothers may feel they should be breastfeeding. Conversely, breastfeeding mothers may feel forced to feed in uncomfortable circumstances. Some may see breastfeeding as "indecent, disgusting, animalistic, sexual, and even possibly a perverse act." Advocates (known by the neologism "lactivists") use "nurse-ins" to show support for breastfeeding in public. One study that approached the subject from a feminist viewpoint suggested that both nursing and non-nursing mothers often feel maternal guilt and shame, with formula-feeding mothers feeling that they are not living up to the ideals of motherhood and nursing mothers concerned that they are transgressing "cultural expectations regarding feminine modesty." The authors advocate that women be provided with education on breastfeeding's benefits as well as problem-solving skills, however, there is no conclusive evidence that breastfeeding education alone improves initiation of breastfeeding or the proportion of women breastfeeding either exclusively or partially at 3 months and 6 months.

=== Location ===
In the United States, all fifty states, along with the District of Columbia, Puerto Rico, and the U.S. Virgin Islands, have laws that allow a mother to breastfeed a baby in any public or private location. In that country, the Friendly Airports for Mothers (FAM) Act was signed into law in 2019, and the requirements went into effect in 2021. This law requires that all large and medium hub airports in the U.S. provide a private, non-bathroom lactation space in each terminal building.

Some commercial establishments in the U.S. provide breastfeeding rooms, although laws generally specify that mothers may breastfeed anywhere without requiring a special area. Despite these laws, many women in the United States continue to be publicly shamed or asked to refrain from breastfeeding in public. In the United Kingdom, the Equality Act 2010 makes the prevention of breastfeeding in any public place discrimination under the law. In Scotland, it is a criminal offense for one to attempt to prevent another from feeding a child under 24 months in public.

While laws in the U.S. were passed in 2010 which required that nursing mothers who had returned to work be given a non-bathroom space to express milk and a reasonable break time to do so, as of 2016 the majority of American women still did not have access to both accommodations.

In 2014, newly elected Pope Francis drew worldwide commentary when he encouraged mothers to breastfeed babies in church. During a papal baptism, he said that mothers "should not stand on ceremony" if their children were hungry. "If they are hungry, mothers, feed them, without thinking twice," he said, smiling. "Because they are the most important people here."

== Prevalence ==
exclusive breastfeeding rate

Percentage of US infants breastfeeding by month since birth in 2008. Dotted line: Exclusive breastfeeding Dashed line Any breastfeeding * Estimated at 7 days after birth

In 2012, 37.1% of infants under six months of age were breastfeeding exclusively, which rose to 48% in 2022. The Sustainable Development Goals target is to achieve 70% by 2030.

In the United States, the rate of women beginning to breastfeed was 76% in 2009, increasing to 83% in 2015, with 58% still breastfeeding at 6 months, although only 25% were still breastfeeding exclusively. African-American women have persistently low rates of breastfeeding compared to White and Hispanic American women. In 2014, 58.1% of African-American women breastfeed in the early postpartum period, compared to 77.7% of White women and 80.6% of Hispanic women. In 2019, 84.1% of U.S. women giving birth initiated breastfeeding, with 87.4%, 85.5%, 73.6%, 90.3% and 83.1% of Hispanic, White, African-American, Asian and Multiracial mothers initiating, respectively. Rates of initiation among African-American mothers varied widely by state, with lows under 53% and highs over 90%.

Breastfeeding rates in different parts of China vary considerably.

Rates in the United Kingdom were the lowest in the world in 2015, with only 0.5% of mothers still breastfeeding at a year, while in Germany, 23% are doing so, 56% in Brazil, and 99% in Senegal.

In Australia, for children born in 2004, more than 90% were initially breastfed. In Canada, for children born in 2005–06, more than 50% were only breastfed, and more than 15% received both breastmilk and other liquids by the age of 3 months.

== History ==
In the Egyptian, Greek and Roman Empires, women usually fed only their own children. However, breastfeeding began to be seen as something too common to be done by royalty. Wet nurses were employed to breastfeed the children of the royal families. This extended over time, particularly in western Europe, where noble women often used wet nurses. Lower-class women breastfed their infants and used a wet nurse only if they were unable to feed their own infant. Attempts were made in 15th-century Europe to use cow or goat milk, but these attempts were unsuccessful. In the 18th century, flour or cereal mixed with broth was introduced as a substitute for breastfeeding, but this provided inadequate nutrition. The appearance of improved infant formulas in the mid-19th century and their increased use caused a decrease in breastfeeding rates, which accelerated after World War II. For some in the US, Canada, and the UK, breastfeeding was seen as uncultured. From the 1960s onwards, breastfeeding experienced a revival that continued into the 2000s, though negative attitudes towards the practice were still entrenched in some countries up to the 1990s.

== Society and culture ==
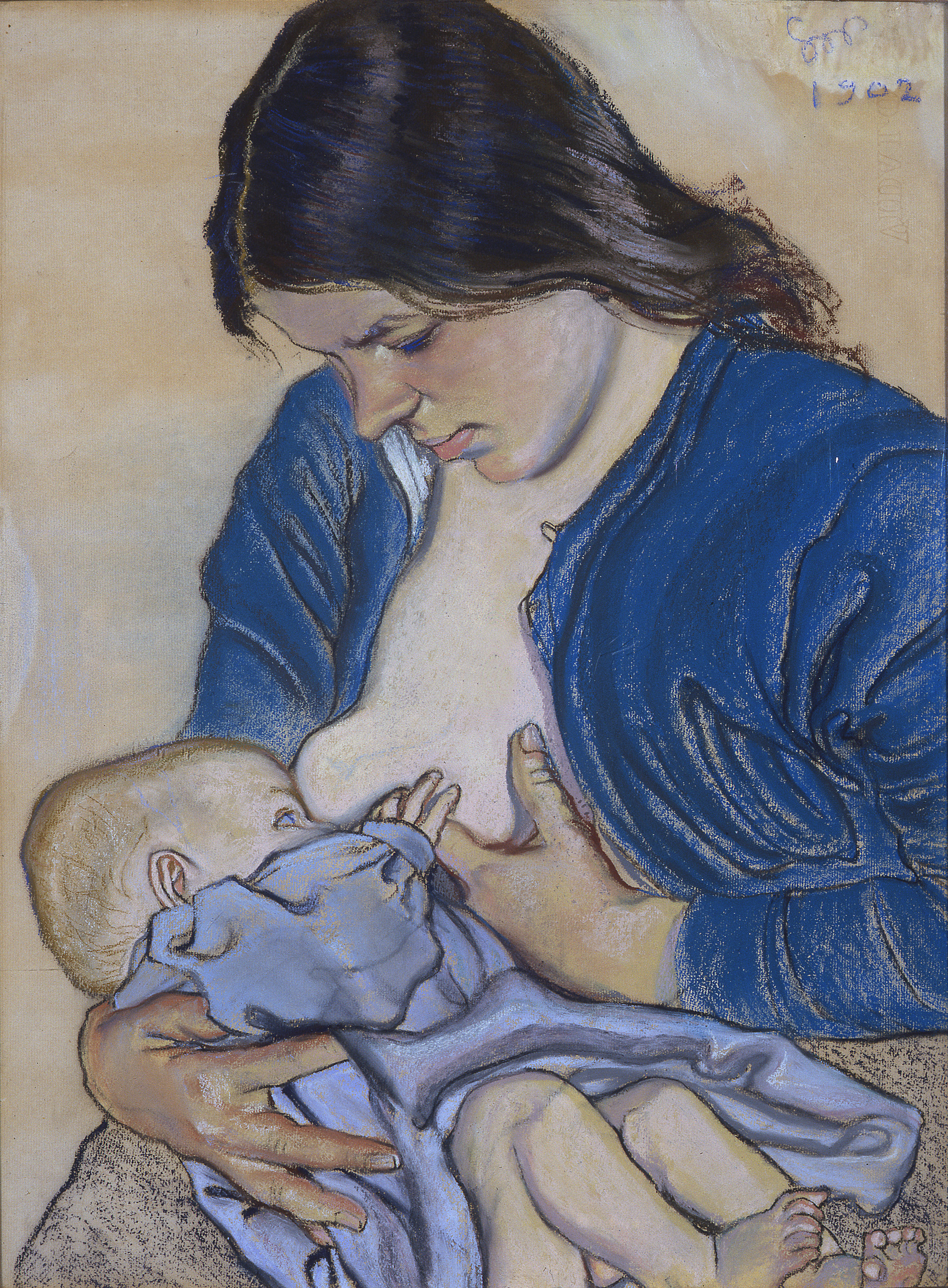
Macierzyństwo ('Maternity'), a 1902 painting by Stanisław Wyspiański

=== Financial considerations ===
Breastfeeding is less costly than alternatives, but the mother generally must eat more food than would otherwise be necessary. In the US, the extra money spent on food (about US $18 each week) is usually about half the cost of infant formula. According to the CDC, breastfeeding mothers need an extra 450 to 500 calories per day compared to their pre-pregnancy caloric intake.

Breastfeeding reduces health care costs and the cost of caring for sick babies. Parents of breastfed babies are less likely to miss work and lose income because their babies are sick. Looking at three of the most common infant illnesses, lower respiratory tract illnesses, otitis media, and gastrointestinal illness, one study compared infants who had been exclusively breastfed for at least three months to those who had not. It found that in the first year of life, there were 2033 excess office visits, 212 excess days of hospitalization, and 609 excess prescriptions for these three illnesses per 1000 never-breastfed infants compared with 1000 infants exclusively breastfed for at least 3 months. However, in a study of over 140,000 newborns in the first month of life, exclusively breastfed newborns had higher hospital readmission rates than those exclusively formula fed, and those exclusively breastfed also had more neonatal outpatient visits compared to those exclusively formula fed.

=== Breastfeeding in humanitarian emergencies ===
During humanitarian crises, conflicts, forced displacement, and natural disasters, mothers and caregivers face additional difficulties in maintaining adequate breastfeeding practices. They may experience physical and mental exhaustion, lack safe and private spaces for on-demand breastfeeding, and have limited social support. In many of these situations, unsolicited donations of breast milk substitutes may be distributed through well-intentioned but poorly informed solidarity initiatives. Relying on these products often interrupts breast milk production and creates dependence on formula milk, whose use carries critical health risks in settings where clean water and hygiene materials are not fully accessible.

Following a key meeting hosted by the International Baby Food Action Network (IBFAN) in 1995, the Infant Feeding in Emergencies (IFE) Core Group was established in 1999 to address policy guidance and capacity-building on infant and young child feeding in emergencies. Over the years, and in collaboration with many other humanitarian organisations, the IFE Core Group has issued key recommendations aimed at monitoring and controlling unsolicited donations of breast milk substitutes, protecting early initiation of breastfeeding, providing food or financial assistance to caregivers, safeguarding infants who depend exclusively on formula milk, establishing and maintaining community support spaces for infant and young child feeding, and fostering inter-sectoral coordination to promote a positive environment for breastfeeding.

=== Criticism of breastfeeding advocacy ===
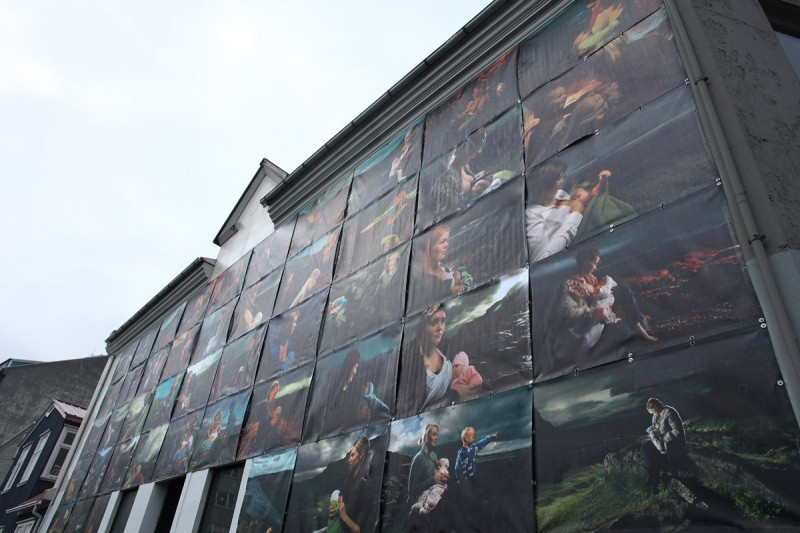
"See It", a project by Fiann Paul dedicated to promoting awareness of breastfeeding in Reykjavík, Iceland, in 2011

There are controversies and ethical considerations surrounding the means used by public campaigns which attempt to increase breastfeeding rates, relating to pressure put on women, and potential feelings of guilt and shame of women who fail to breastfeed; and social condemnation of women who use formula. In addition to this, there is also the moral question as to what degree the state or medical community can interfere with a person's self-determination: for example in the United Arab Emirates the law requires women to breastfeed babies for at least 2 years and allows husbands to sue them if they do not.

It is widely assumed that if women's healthcare providers encourage them to breastfeed, those who choose not to will experience more guilt. Evidence does not support this assumption. On the contrary, a study on the effects of prenatal breastfeeding counselling found that those who had received such counselling and chosen to formula-feed denied experiencing feelings of guilt. Women were equally comfortable with their subsequent choices for feeding their infant, regardless of whether they had received encouragement to breastfeed.

Preventing a situation where women are denied agency or stigmatized for formula use is also seen as important. In 2018, in the UK, a policy statement from the Royal College of Midwives said that women should be supported and not stigmatized if, after being given advice and information, they choose to formula feed.

=== Social marketing ===
Social marketing is a marketing approach intended to change people's behavior to benefit both individuals and society. When applied to breastfeeding promotion, social marketing works to provide positive messages and images of breastfeeding to increase visibility. Social marketing in the context of breastfeeding has shown efficacy in media campaigns. Some oppose the marketing of infant formula, especially in developing countries. They are concerned that mothers who use formula will stop breastfeeding and become dependent upon substitutes that are unaffordable or less safe. Through efforts including the Nestlé boycott, they have advocated for bans on free samples of infant formula and for the adoption of pro-breastfeeding codes such as the International Code of Marketing of Breast-milk Substitutes by the World Health Assembly in 1981 and the Innocenti Declaration by WHO and UNICEF policy-makers in August 1990. Additionally, formula companies have spent millions internationally on campaigns to promote the use of formula as an alternative to mother's milk. Giving out gift bags that contain infant formula to women as they leave the hospital is also a marketing strategy. The U.S. Government Accountability Office has reported that women who receive formula samples at discharge are associated with lower breastfeeding rates than those who do not receive gift bags.

=== Baby Friendly Hospital Initiative ===
The Baby Friendly Hospital Initiative (BFHI) is a program launched by the World Health Organization (WHO) in conjunction with UNICEF to promote infant feeding and maternal bonding through certified hospitals and birthing centers. BFHI was developed as a response to the influence held by formula companies in private and public maternal health care. The initiative has two core tenets: the Ten Steps to Successful Breastfeeding and the International Code of Marketing of Breast-milk Substitutes. The BFHI has especially targeted hospitals and birthing centers in the developing world, as these facilities are most at risk to the detrimental effects of reduced breastfeeding rates. As of 2018, 530 hospitals in the United States hold the "Baby-Friendly" title in all 50 states. Globally, there are more than 20,000 "Baby-Friendly" hospitals worldwide in over 150 countries.

=== Representation on television ===
The first depiction of breastfeeding on television was in the children's program Sesame Street, in 1977. With few exceptions since that time, breastfeeding on television has either been portrayed as strange, disgusting, or a source of comedy, or it has been omitted entirely in favor of bottle feeding.

=== Religion ===
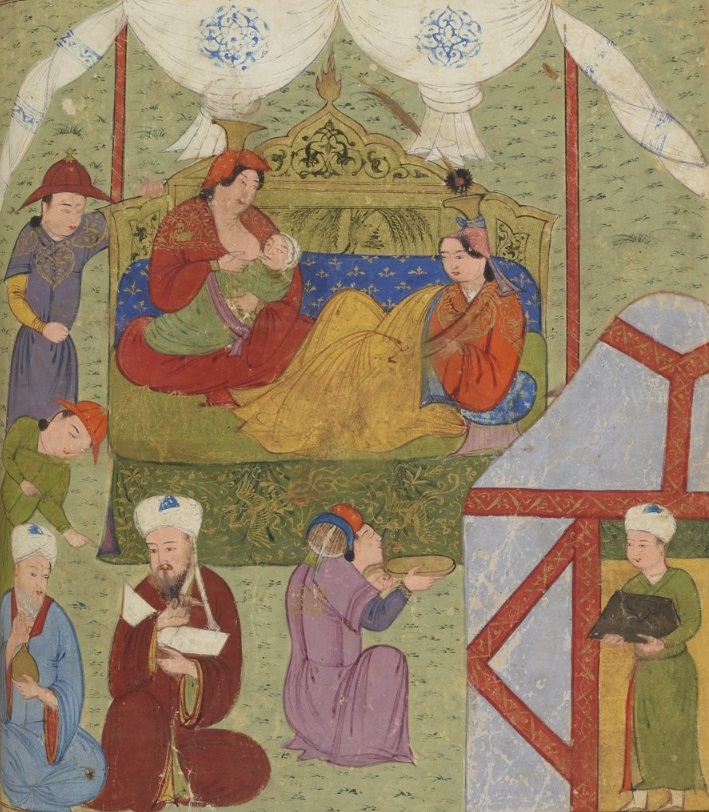
Ilkhanate prince Ghazan being breastfed

In some cultures, people who have been breastfed by the same woman are milk-siblings who are equal in legal and social standing to a consanguineous sibling. Islam has a complex system of rules regarding this, known as Rada (fiqh). Like the Christian practice of godparenting, milk kinship established a second family that could take responsibility for a child whose biological parents came to harm. "Milk kinship in Islam thus appears to be a culturally distinctive, but by no means unique, institutional form of adoptive kinship."

In Western countries, differences in breastfeeding practices have also been observed according to the affiliation or practice of Christian religions; unaffiliated and Protestant women exhibit higher rates of breastfeeding.

=== Transgender women ===
Milk production can be induced in transgender women by the use of hormone medication, usually a galactagogue similarly to induced lactation in cisgender women, with domperidone being a common choice. Induced lactation without the use of galactagogues has also been demonstrated in at least two cases using a modified feminizing hormone therapy featuring progesterone and nipple stimulation, with eventual successful production of breast milk. In one case report, a transgender woman was able to produce 7 mL of milk per day with hormone treatment. A different transgender woman was able to produce 8 oz of milk per day achieving "sufficient breast milk volume to be the sole source of nourishment for her child for six weeks." Several studies analyzing milk samples from trans women have found them to contain nutrients within parameters suitable for nursing.

A 2018 survey of medical professionals with attending a WPATH event where 34% of the surveyed professionals had met a transgender patient expressing interest in induced lactation, 21% of them knew of providers who facilitated lactation for transgender patients, and 9% had themselves helped trans women induce lactation.

== Workplace ==
The International breastfeeding symbol

Many mothers have to return to work a short time after their babies have been born. In the U.S., about 70% of mothers with children younger than three years old work full-time, with 1/3 of the mothers returning to work within 3 months and 2/3 returning within 6 months. Working outside of the home and full-time work are significantly associated with lower rates of breastfeeding and breastfeeding for a shorter duration of time. According to the Centers for Disease Control and Prevention, support for breastfeeding in the workplace includes several types of employee benefits and services, including writing corporate policies to support breastfeeding women; teaching employees about breastfeeding; providing designated private space for breastfeeding or expressing milk; allowing flextime to support milk expression during work; giving mothers options for returning to work, such as remote work, part-time jobs, and extended maternity leave; providing on-site or near-site child care; providing high-quality breast pumps; and offering professional lactation consultants.

Programs to promote and assist nursing mothers have been found to help maintain breastfeeding. In the United States the CDC reports on a study that "examined the effect of corporate lactation programs on breastfeeding behavior among employed women in California [which] included prenatal classes, perinatal counseling, and lactation management after the return to work". They found that "about 75% of mothers in the lactation programs continued breastfeeding at least 6 months, although nationally only 10% of mothers employed full-time who initiated breastfeeding were still breastfeeding at 6 months."

Section 4207 of the United States' Patient Protection and Affordable Care Act (2010) amended the Fair Labor Standards Act and required employers to provide a reasonable break time for an hourly employee to breastfeed a child if the child is less than one year old. The employee must be allowed to breastfeed in a private place, other than a bathroom. The employer is not required to pay the employee during the break time. Employers with fewer than 50 employees are not required to comply with the law if doing so would impose an undue hardship to the employer based on its size, finances, nature, or structure of its business.

A 2016 study found that federal policy does not address lactation space functionality and accessibility, policy only protects a subset of employees, and that the enforcement of the policy requires women to file a complaint with the United States Department of Labor. To address each of these issues, the report recommends additional requirements surrounding lactation space and functionality, mandated coverage of exempt employees, and a requirement that employers develop company-specific lactation policies. As of 2019, the majority of women still did not have access to both accommodations. Working mother advocate and Entrepreneur writer Christine Michel Carter documented her experience pumping in a bathroom while working for an employer violating the Fair Labor Standards Act.

In 2022, the Providing Urgent Maternal Protections for Nursing Mothers Act, also known as the PUMP Act, became law in the United States. It mandates that salaried workers who are breastfeeding must have break time and a private space that is not a bathroom. However, employers who do not have 50 or more employees do not have to follow this law if following it would create an undue hardship because of expense or difficulty.

In April 2018, the U.S. Senate's rules were changed to allow any senator with a child under one year of age to bring them on the Senate floor and breastfeed them during voting.

In Canada, British Columbia and Ontario, provincial Human Rights Codes prevent workplace discrimination due to breastfeeding. In British Columbia, employers are required to provide accommodation to employees who breastfeed or express breast milk. Although no specific requirements are mandated, under the Human Rights Code, accommodations suggested include paid breaks (not including meal breaks), private facilities that include clean running water, comfortable seating areas, and refrigeration equipment, as well as flexibility in terms of work-related conflicts. In Ontario, employers are encouraged to accommodate breastfeeding employees by providing additional breaks without fear of discrimination. Unlike British Columbia, the Ontario Code does not include specific recommendations and, therefore, leaves significant flexibility for employers.

== Research ==
Breastfeeding research continues to assess prevalence, HIV transmission, pharmacology, costs, benefits, immunology, contraindications, and comparisons to synthetic breast milk substitutes. Factors related to the mental health of the nursing mother in the perinatal period have been studied. While cognitive behavior therapy may be the treatment of choice, medications are sometimes used. The use of therapy rather than medication reduces the infant's exposure to medication that may be transmitted through the milk. In coordination with institutional organisms, researchers are also studying the social impact of breastfeeding throughout history. Accordingly, strategies have been developed to foster the increase of the breastfeeding rates in the different countries.

== See also ==
- Baby-led weaning
- Breast shell
- Breastfeeding and fertility
- Breastfeeding and mental health
- Breastfeeding in art
- Breastfeeding in public
- Breastfeeding promotion
- Breastmilk storage and handling
- Child development
- Dairy allergy
- Lactation failure (disambiguation)
- Lactation room
- Milk line
- Nursing chair
- Public health
- World Alliance for Breastfeeding Action

== Sources ==
This article incorporates text from a free content work. Licensed under CC BY 4.0. Text taken from The State of Food Security and Nutrition in the World 2024, FAO, IFAD, UNICEF, WFP and WHO, FAO.

This article incorporates text from a free content work. Licensed under CC BY 4.0 (license statement/permission). Text taken from The State of Food Security and Nutrition in the World 2026, Food and Agriculture Organization of the United Nations.

== Bibliography ==
- Durham R (2014). Maternal-newborn nursing: the critical components of nursing care. Philadelphia: F.A. Davis Company. ISBN 978-0-8036-3704-7.
- Henry N (2016). RN maternal newborn nursing: review module. Stilwell, KS: Assessment Technologies Institute. ISBN 978-1-56533-569-1.
- Davidson M (2014). Fast facts for the antepartum and postpartum nurse: a nursing orientation and care guide in a nutshell. New York: Springer Publishing Company, LLC. ISBN 978-0-8261-6887-0.
- Lawrence RA, Lawrence RM (2015). Breastfeeding: A Guide for the Medical Professional. Elsevier Health Sciences. pp. 227–228. ISBN 978-0-323-39420-8.
