= Himayatnagar =

Himayatnagar may refer to:

- Himayatnagar, Ranga Reddy district: A village of Rangareddy District in Telangana, India
- Himayatnagar, Maharashtra: A tehsil of Nanded District in Maharashtra, India
- Himayatnagar, Hyderabad: A suburb of the city of Hyderabad, Telangana, India

== See also ==
- Himayathnagar (disambiguation)
