= George Menezes =

Indian diplomat and writer (1929–2016)

- Jorge de Menezes
- Born: 10 April 1929; Byculla, Bombay, British India
- Died: 9 September 2016 (aged 87); Bandra, Mumbai, India
- Occupations: Author, diplomat, corporate executive, indian air force officer
- Parent: Armando Menezes
- Relatives: Armida Fernandez (sister); Nicolau Menezes (uncle)
- Writing career
- Notable works: Pardon, Your Middle is Showing; One Sip at a Time

George Menezes (10 April 1929 – 9 September 2016) was an Indian author, former Indian Air Force officer, diplomat, and corporate executive. Known for his works in political and social satire, he has also held significant positions within the Catholic Church's lay leadership organizations.

== Early life and education ==
Menezes was born on 10 April 1929 at Eugenes Maternity Home in Byculla, Bombay. He is the eldest son of Armando Menezes, an English scholar, poet, and critic active in the 1940s, and Matilda Rebello e Menezes.

He spent much of his childhood in Dharwad, where his father was the principal of Karnatak College. A notable event in his youth occurred at the age of 13, when he was imprisoned for a day for his role in burning a railway station during a protest against the British Raj.

Menezes attended Karnatak College in Dharwad, where he earned an Honours degree in English Literature and French. He later obtained a post-graduate diploma in Business Management. His education continued internationally with training in industrial psychology in West Germany and an internship in behavioral sciences at the National Training Laboratory in the United States.

== Career ==
=== Military and diplomatic service ===
Menezes served in the Indian Air Force until 1963, attaining the rank of Squadron Leader. During his service, he spent four years as an Assistant Air Attache at the Indian Embassy in Paris. Notably, in 1961, he served as the Liaison Officer to Prime Minister Jawaharlal Nehru during Nehru's tour of Europe.

=== Corporate and academic career ===
Following his military service, Menezes entered the corporate sector as the Personnel Director for Hoechst Pharmaceuticals Ltd. In this role, he oversaw personnel and training operations for the company across India and South-East Asia. After retiring from Hoechst, he became the associate director of the Xavier Institute of Management.

Menezes has served as a visiting faculty member at several institutions, including the National Academy of Administration in Mussoorie, the Indian Revenue Services (Direct Taxes) in Nagpur, the Administrative staff College in Maharashtra, the Jamnalal Bajaj Institute, the Tata Institute of Social Sciences, the Tata Management Training Centre in Pune, and NITIE in Powai, Bombay. He has also conducted training laboratories and programs for diverse groups, including clergy, students, teachers, and corporate entities.

He has been a member of the Board of Studies for Management at both the Bombay University and Goa University. Additionally, he has served on advisory councils for organizations such as the YMCA, Nirmala Niketan College of Social Work, Symbiosis Institute, and Sophia College.

== Writing and public speaking ==
Menezes was a writer known for his humor and satire regarding social and political issues. His published books include Pardon, Your Middle is Showing (published by Orient Longman) and One Sip at a Time.

He was a columnist for various publications. His columns included "Menezes' Musings" for Debonair, "By George" for both The Indian Express and Sunday Mid-day, and "Sugar and Spice" for Goa Today. He also contributed centre-page articles to The Times of India. Beyond writing, he was a public speaker known for employing satire.

Menezes was a polyglot, speaking eight languages: English, French, German, Portuguese, Spanish, Hindi, Marathi, Konkani, and Kannada.

The Naked Liberal (2013) is an anthology of Menezes' writings that has been edited by Selma Carvalho.

== Social and religious leadership ==
Menezes held prominent roles in Catholic lay organizations. In 1984, he was appointed as a member of the Pontifical Council for the Laity, an advisory body to the Pope, becoming one of only twenty-three members worldwide to hold the position at that time. He was also the first Indian member of the "Think Tank" for the Laity Office of the Federation of Asian Bishops' Conferences.

Additionally, he served as the first Asian Director of the International Council of Catholic Men and served a term as the President of the All India Catholic Union. He was also the chairman of the Society for the Protection of Fundamental Rights and championed the cause of Dalit Christians. One of his notable achievements was organizing a rally for Mother Teresa in 1981 at the St. Andrew's school grounds in Bandra.

He was a member of the Bombay Management Association, the Indian Institute of Personnel Management, and the Indian Society for Training and Development.

== Personal life ==
Menezes married Thecla Mascarenhas on 30 December 1956 at St. Michael's Church in Mahim, Mumbai. They had two children, a son named Christophe and a daughter named Anjali.

== Death ==
Menezes died on 9 September 2016 at his home in Bandra, Mumbai, at the age of 87. His funeral was held at St. Andrew's Church, Mumbai.
