= Himayathnagar =

Himayatnagar may refer to:

- Himayatnagar, Hyderabad, a suburb of the city of Hyderabad, Andhra Pradesh, India
- Himayathnagar, Moinabad mandal, a village of Rangareddy District in Andhra Pradesh, India
- Himayatnagar, Maharashtra, a tehsil of Nanded District in Maharashtra, India

== See also ==
- Himayatnagar (disambiguation)
