= Azam Jah =

Son of the last nizam of Hyderabad (1907–1970)

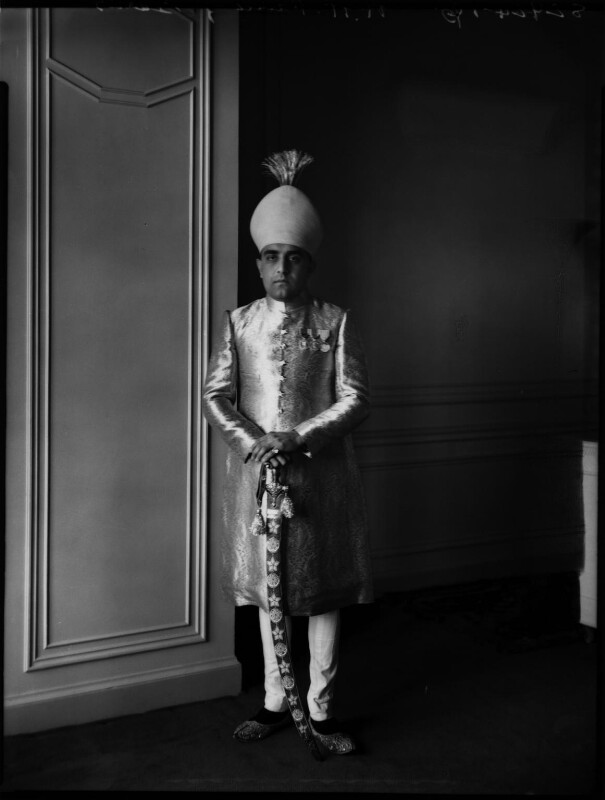
- Azam Jah in 1937
- Born: 22 February 1907; Hyderabad, Kingdom of Hyderabad, British India (present-day Telangana, India)
- Died: 7 October 1970 (aged 63)
- Spouse: Dürrüşehvar Sultan (m. 1931; div. 1954)
- Issue: Mukarram Jah; Muffakham Jah
Names
- Sahebzada Mir Himayat Ali Khan Siddiqi Azam Jah
- House: House of Asaf Jah
- Father: Osman Ali Khan
- Mother: Sahebzadi Azamunnisa Begum (Dulhan Pasha Begum)

Sahebzada Mir Himayat Ali Khan Siddiqi Azam Jah (Urdu: اعظم جاہ داماد والاشان صاحب زادہ نواب سر میر حمایت علی خان بہادر بے آفندی; 21/22 February 1907 – 9 October 1970) was the eldest son of the seventh and last Nizam of Hyderabad, Mir Osman Ali Khan, Asaf Jah VII and Sahebzadi Azamunnisa Begum, daughter of Sahebzada Mir Jahangir Ali Khan Siddiqi.

== Life ==
In 1936, he was given the courtesy title of prince of Berar, a territory of the Nizam then leased in perpetuity to the British and administered by them.

In 1931 Azam Jah married Dürrüşehvar Sultan, a member of the House of Osman (formerly of the Ottoman Empire) and the daughter of the last Ottoman Caliph Abdülmecid II, in Nice on 12 November 1932. They had two sons together; their marriage ended in divorce in 1954.

On the death of the seventh Nizam, the title passed to Azam Jah's elder son, Sahebzada Mir Barkat Ali Khan Siddiqi Mukarram Jah, as the eighth Nizam. Whereas, Azam's younger son is Sahebzada Mir Karamat Ali Khan Siddiqi Muffakham Jah.

He lived at Bella Vista, Hyderabad, a 10-acre (40,000 m^{2}) palace near Hussain Sagar.

== Titles ==
- 1907–1912: Second Wali Ahad Nawab Mir Himayat 'Ali Khan Siddiqi Bahadur
- 1912–1934: Wali Ahad Sahebzada Nawab Mir Himayat 'Ali Khan Bahadur
- 1934–1937: Major His Highness Azam Jah, Walashan Sahebzada Nawab Mir Himayat 'Ali Khan Siddiqi Bahadur, Prince of Berar
- 1937–1942: General His Highness Azam Jah, Walashan Sahebzada Nawab Mir Himayat 'Ali Khan Siddiqi Bahadur, Prince of Berar
- 1942–1947: General His Highness Azam Jah, Walashan Sahebzada Nawab Mir Sir Himayat 'Ali Khan Siddiqi Bahadur, Prince of Berar, GBE
- 1947–1970: General His Highness Azam Jah, Walashan Sahebzada Nawab Mir Sir Himayat 'Ali Khan Siddiqi Bahadur, Prince of Berar, GCIE, GBE

== Notable philanthropy ==
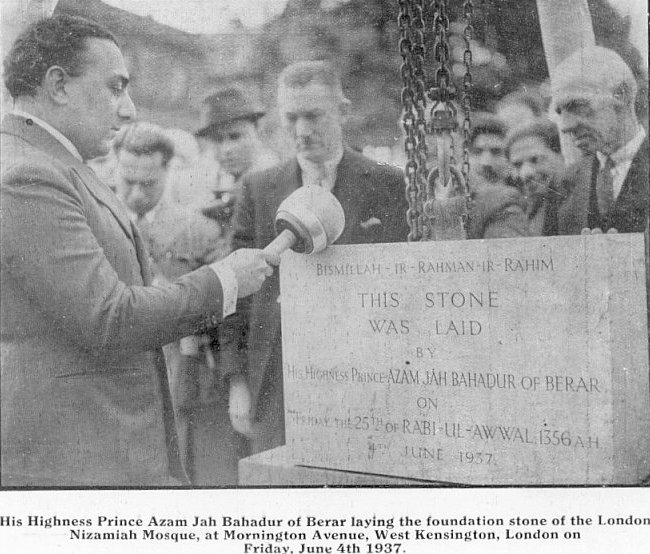
Prince Azam Jah son of Asaf Jah 7 laying the foundation stone of the mosque

The (Nizamia Mosque) now known as (London Central Mosque) was funded by the Osman Ali Khan, Asaf Jah VII and the foundation stone of the mosque was laid on Friday, 4 June 1937, by his eldest son - His Highness Prince Azam Jah.

== Honours and legacy ==
(ribbon bar, as it would look today; incomplete)

- King George V Silver Jubilee Medal – 1935
- King George VI Coronation Medal – 1937
- Nizam Silver Jubilee Medal – 1937
- Tunis Victory Medal – 1942
- Knight Grand Cross of the Order of the British Empire (GBE) – 1943
- Defence Medal – 1945
- War Medal 1939-1945 – 1945
- Hyderabad War Medal – 1945
- (Hyderabad) Meritorious Service Medal-1945
- Knight Grand Commander of the Order of the Indian Empire (GCIE) – 1946

=== Namesakes ===
- Himayatnagar, Hyderabad
- Himayatnagar, Maharashtra
- Himayatnagar, Ranga Reddy district
- Himayat Sagar
- Himayat Bagh, Aurangabad
- Himayat (mango)

== See also ==
- Asaf Jahi dynasty – Muslim dynasty that ruled the Hyderabad State of India from 1734 to 1948
