= Human milk bank =

Service that collects and dispenses human milk

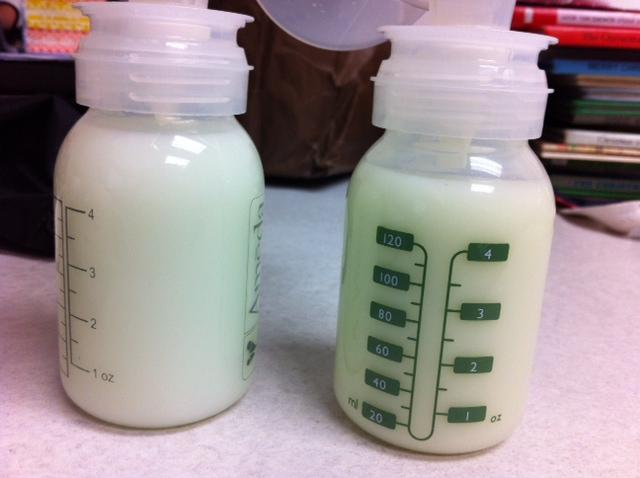
Bottles of pumped breast milk. The milk will need to be transferred to bags and frozen for donation.

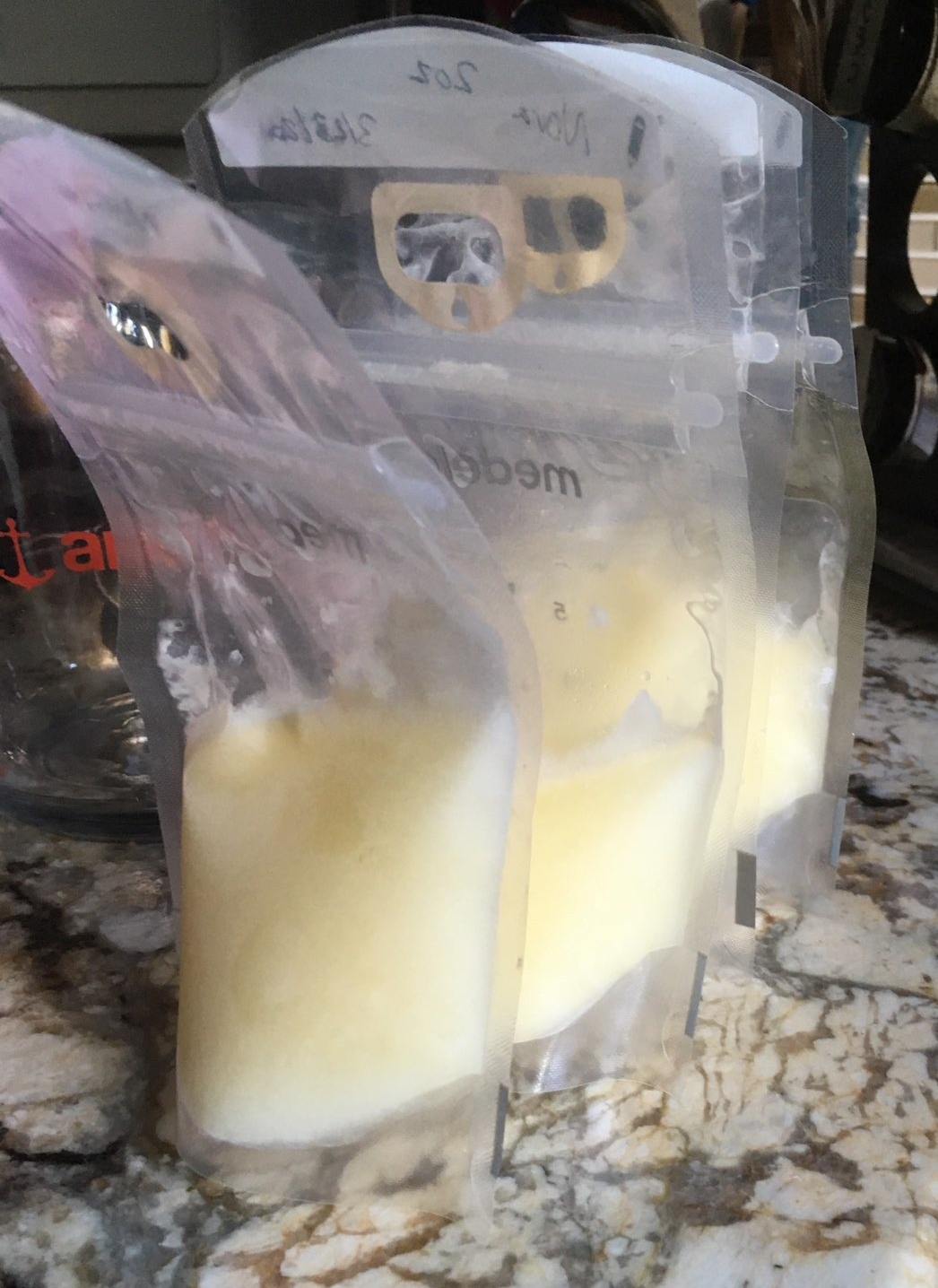
Frozen bags of pumped breast milk. These are ready to be donated.

A human milk bank, breast milk bank or lactarium is a service that collects, screens, processes, pasteurizes, and dispenses by prescription human milk donated by nursing mothers who are not biologically related to the recipient infant. The optimum nutrition for newborn infants is breast milk for at least the first 6 months of life. For women who are unable to breast feed or produce enough milk, pasteurized donor breast milk may be an effective approach to feeding. Breast milk supplied by a woman other than the baby's mother that is not pasteurized and informal breast milk sharing is associated with a risk of transmitting bacteria and viruses from the donor mother to the baby and is not considered a safe alternative. If pasteurized donor breast milk is not available, commercial formula is suggested as a second alternative.

Human milk banks may offer a solution to the mothers that cannot supply their own breast milk to their child, for reasons such as a baby being at risk of getting diseases and infections from a mother with certain diseases, or when a child is hospitalized at birth due to very low birth weight (and thus at risk for conditions such as necrotizing enterocolitis), and the mother cannot provide her own milk during the extended stay for reasons such as living far from the hospital.

The demand and use of human milk banks is increasing. The International Milk Banking Initiative (IMBI), was founded at the International HMBANA Congress in 2005. It lists 33 countries with milk bank programs. The World Health Organization (WHO) states that the first alternative to a biological mother not being able to breast feed is the use of human milk from other sources.

The primary and by far the largest group of consumers of human breast milk are premature babies. Infants with gastrointestinal disorders or metabolic disorders may also consume this form of milk as well. Human breast milk acts as a substitute, instead of formula, when a mother cannot provide her own milk. Human breast milk can also be fed to toddlers and children with medical conditions that include but are not limited to chemotherapy for cancer and growth failure while on formula.

== History ==
Donating breast milk can be traced back to the practice of wet nursing. The first record of regulations regarding the sharing of breastmilk are found in the Babylonian Code of Hammurabi (1800 BCE). These regulations were motivated by the long-held belief that infants inherit the nurse's traits through their breast milk. By the 11th-century European culture considered breastfeeding indecent, which led wet nursing to become common practice among royalty and aristocracy of Europe. The practice of wet nursing declined by the 19th century due to concerns regarding unhealthy lifestyles among nurses. Consequently, the medical community began researching the effects of alternative nutrition on neonates. Theodor Escherich of the University of Vienna conducted studies from 1902 to 1911 investigating different sources of nutrition and their effect on neonates. His studies demonstrated that breastfed neonate's intestinal bacteria was significantly different compared to neonates fed by other means. In 1909, Escherich opened the first human milk bank. The following year, another milk bank opened in the Boston Floating Hospital, the first milk bank in the United States.

The 1960s saw a decline in milk banking because of recent advances in neonatal care and baby formula. Despite these new advancements, in 1980 the World Health Organization and the United Nations Children's Fund maintained their position that donor breast milk is the best alternative to the mother's breast milk. The practice of milk banking declined further with the HIV epidemic. The need for stringent screening increased the cost of operating milk banks, forcing them to close doors.

Today, however, improved screening methods and standardization of procedure have made donated milk a viable alternative to mother's breast milk. The ability to pasteurize and store breast milk for up to 8 months means milk banking could become a global enterprise.

== Donor requirement ==
A donor must:

- Be healthy
- Be in the process of lactation
- Undertake a chest x-ray or tine test
- Have a negative VDRL
- Have no evidence of hepatitis
- Be HIV negative

More requirements may apply. For example, the requirements in Australia can be found at: http://jhl.sagepub.com/content/2/1/20.full.pdf. The Australian Red Cross Lifeblood offers a self-diagnostic quiz where donors can check if they are eligible to donate before they register.

== Concerns ==
Some concerns that surround human milk bank include:

- Cost
- Availability
- Lack of health care provider interest
- Concern about the type of women who might donate
- Effective pasteurizing of the donor milk

== Consumers ==
After the milk has been donated the primary consumer of the milk are premature babies; other consumers include adults with medical complications or conditions. The main reason why premature babies consume donor milk is that the mother cannot provide milk for the baby. The donor milk therefore acts as a substitute.

== Health benefits of human milk banks ==
Human milk banks offer families a chance to provide their child with reliable and healthy milk from other mothers. Human milk banks are needed as they offer milk which mostly is consumed by children whose mothers are not able to provide them with reliable milk.

== Human milk banks around the world ==
=== Africa ===
In 2022, lactation consultant and medical doctor Chinny Obinwanne launched Milk Bank Nigeria.

=== Brazil and Latin America ===
Brazil has an extensive network of 217 milk banks, and is considered to have the most cost efficient system of milk banking in the world. Since the inception of the first milk bank in 1985, the infant mortality rate in Brazil has dropped 73% due, in part, to the popularization of milk banks. In 2011, 165,000 liters (5,580,000 fl oz) of breast milk were donated by some 166,000 mothers, and provided to nearly 170,000 babies. The Brazilian and Ibero-American Network of Human Milk Banks coordinates these efforts. All donors are screened: in general, they must be healthy and not be taking any medication. The Brazilian system is defined by its inexpensive pasteurization of milk and has spread to other countries such as Spain, Portugal, the Cape Verde Islands, and portions of the rest of Latin America.

=== Europe ===
There are 223 active human milk banks in 28 countries within Europe, with 14 more planned as of November 2018. Currently, Italy has the most milk banks, at 39, while Georgia, Slovenia, and Turkey have the least, having no milk banks.

=== North America ===
The Human Milk Banking Association of North America (HMBANA) has a "Guidelines for the Establishment and Operation of a Donor Human Milk Bank" that establishes exhaustive guidelines for safe milk collection and usage in North America. There are 16 milk banks in North America as of 2014. They collect about 3,000,000 oz per year as of 2013.

=== South Africa ===
South Africa has a breast milk collection and distribution program, Milk Matters, based in Cape Town.

=== Singapore ===
Singapore launched a three-year pilot donor breast milk bank on Thursday 17 August 2017. It is a collaboration between KK Women's and Children's Hospital (KKH) and Temasek Foundation Cares. The foundation has set aside S$1.37 million (US$1 million) for the milk bank, which will collect, screen, process and store breast milk from donor mothers.

=== Australia ===
As of 2020 Australia had at least six human milk banks in operation:

- Australian Red Cross Lifeblood
- PREM bank (based at King Edward Memorial Hospital, WA and also supplying Princess Margaret Hospital)
- Royal Prince Alfred (RPA) Hospital neonatal intensive care unit (NSW)
- Mothers Milk Bank Pty Ltd (a private charity, previously located on the Gold Coast, now at Tweed Heads NSW and supplying the Brisbane Mater Children's Hospital as well as some babies in the community)
- Mercy Health Breastmilk Bank (commenced 2011 at Mercy Hospital for Women, Heidelberg VIC)
- Royal Brisbane and Women's Hospital (RBWH) Milk bank (commenced November 2012 at the RBWH Grantley Stable Neonatal Unit)

=== India ===
- Asia's first milk bank was established in 1989 at Sion Hospital, Mumbai, India under the leadership of Armida Fernandez, and is presently run by Jayashree Mondkar, a neo-natologist.
- In 2017, the first milk bank, called the Vatsalya—Maatri Amrit Kosh, was established at Lady Hardinge Medical College. It was established in collaboration with the Norwegian government and the Oslo University as part of the Norway–India Partnership Initiative (NIPI).
- In September 2013, "Yashoda" Human Milk Bank was established in D. Y. Patil Medical College, Hospital and Research Centre, Pimpri, Pune in Maharashtra. Established with the partnership of Rotary Club of Nariman Point, Mumbai, it is the first human milk bank established in a private medical college in India. An advanced human milk bank and Comprehensive Lactation Management, Training and Research Centre (CLMTRC) were established on 31 January 2019.
- Central India's first human milk bank was started in 2016 at Dr. Panjabrao Deshmukh Medical College, Amravati by Rotary Club Of Amravati Midtown.
- In Tamil Nadu, the first milk bank was started in 2014 in Vijaya Hospital, a private hospital in Chennai. In 2016, seven human milk banks were launched in government hospitals by the then chief minister Jayalalitha. This scheme has expanded to cover all medical college hospitals and several government and private hospitals across the state.

== See also ==
- International Breast Milk Project

== Reference List ==
- Italian Association of Donor Human Milk Banks (2015) Survey of Italian Human Milk Banks. Retrieved from http://jhl.sagepub.com
- Bertino E., Giuliani F., Occhi L., Coscia A., Tonetto P., Marchino F., Fabris C. (2009). "Benefits of Donor Human Milk for Preterm Infants: Current Evidence". Early Human Development. 85 (10): 9–10. doi:10.1016/j.earlhumdev.2009.08.010. PMID 19800748.
- Nash, C., & Amir, L., (n.d.) Human Milk Banking: A Review. Retrieved from http://www.breastfeedingindia.com/breastfeeding/human_milk_banks.html
- Nagin, M. K., (2014). Human Milk Banks. Retrieved from http://breastfeeding.about.com/od/breastmilkpumpingcare/a/milkbank.htm
- Milk Banks. (n.d.). Retrieved from http://www.amazingbreastmilk.nhs.uk/support/milk-banks/
