= Kolors Healthcare =

- Type: Health and wellness organisation
- Industry: Healthcare and wellness
- Founded: 2004
- Founder: Dr. D. Vijaya Krishna
- Area served: India
- Services: Weight management, body contouring, skin care and hair care
- Website: www.kolorshealthcare.com

Kolors Healthcare is a wellness company based in Hyderabad, India. It began operations in 2004 and was founded by D. Vijaya Krishna.. Its services include weight management, body contouring, skin care and hair care.

== History ==
In February 2026, Kolors Healthcare opened a centre in Himayatnagar, Hyderabad, under the name Kolors Health Care 2.0. In August 2026, Piramal Alternatives announced a ₹215 crore investment in Kolors Healthcare through its India Credit Opportunities Fund II. The announcement said the funding would support new clinics, upgrades to existing facilities and an expansion of services.

Kolors healthcare launched their new centres ‘Kolors HealthCare 2.0’ in Vijayawada, Himayatnagar, Srikakulam and Gajuwaka in 2026.

== Consumer Complaints ==
In 2024, a Hyderabad district consumer commission ordered a refund of ₹1.35 lakh in a dispute over a weight-loss programme. In a separate case reported in March 2025, the Rangareddy district consumer commission ordered the company to refund ₹80,500 plus interest to a couple who had paid for a programme and attended no sessions. On 10 February 2026, the District Consumer Disputes Redressal Commission, Chennai (North), found that a weight-loss advertisement was misleading because it promised a “100% money-back guarantee” while billing documents stated that fees were non-refundable. The commission ordered the company to pay ₹2 lakh in compensation and to facilitate closure of the complainant’s loan account.
