= Tata Management Training Centre =

Training facility

- Type: Private
- Established: 1966, Pune, India
- Director: Anand Shankar
- Location: Pune, India
- Website: tmtctata.com

The Tata Management Training Centre (TMTC) was established by JRD Tata in the year 1966. Located in Pune, it was awarded the Golden Peacock National Training Award (2007–08) in the field of Training & Development. TMTC focuses on Management and Development.

It has disseminated over 50 publications including management briefs, manuals, research papers, and case studies.

== History ==
TMT Center is designed by architect George Wittet, in 15 acres of land surrounded by trees, lawns, pathways and flower beds, which once belonged to F. E. Dinshaw. In 1918, Dinshaw acquired the services of Wittet, the consulting architect to the Government of Bombay, to build him a country home. Later, additional suites were designed and constructed by Daraius Batliwala and Rustom Patell of Patell Batliwala & Associates.

In the 1960s, it was restored and turned into a residential training center keeping the original layout. The institute can house 60 people within its residential facilities. It also has two lecture halls and two seminar rooms along with a relevant book library. In addition, TMTC has indoor and outdoor sports facilities.

The specialized training institutes, including the Indian Institutes of Management (Ahmedabad and Calcutta), the Administrative Staff College of India (Hyderabad), the All India Management Association and the Indian Society for Applied Behavioral Sciences, also utilizes facilities in the TMTC institute.

== Training ==
TMTC started its e-learning programs in 2009, offering around 250 programs a year, conducted by in-house senior faculty from academics and business, supported by experts from other Indian and international B-schools. Every year, more than 4,000 Tata Managers and Leaders go through training programs.

Leadership development programs include

- Tata Group Strategic Leadership seminar
- Tata Group Executive Leadership seminar
- Tata Group Emerging Leaders seminar

E-learning programs include

- Live e-classroom
- Live video broadcast and
- Self-paced e-learning programs

A self-paced program is conducted named 'TATA – Harvard Manage Mentor self-paced e-learning program' by Harvard Manage Mentor, in association with Harvard Business School Publishing, providing 44 different programs for Tata employees.

Its practice areas include

- Finance, Ethics
- Leadership and Organization
- Markets and Customers
- Strategy and Innovation

It also uses over 120 external faculty.

TMTC hosted training programs for the Indian Administrative Service (IAS), the Indian Police Service (IPS) and the Indian Foreign Service (IFS).

== Partners ==
TMTC partners with number of organizations including Centre for Creative Leadership (CCL), the Conference Executive Board (CEB), the American Society for Training and Development (ASTD) and the Goldratt Schools.
