= Muffakham Jah College of Engineering and Technology =

Engineering college in Hyderabad, India

Coordinates: 17°25′40″N 78°26′33″E

- Motto: Lighted to Enlighten
- Type: Private Institution
- Established: 1980
- Founder: Muffakham Jah
- Affiliations: Osmania University
- Location: Hyderabad, Telangana, India
- Acronym: MJCET
- Website: mjcollege.ac.in

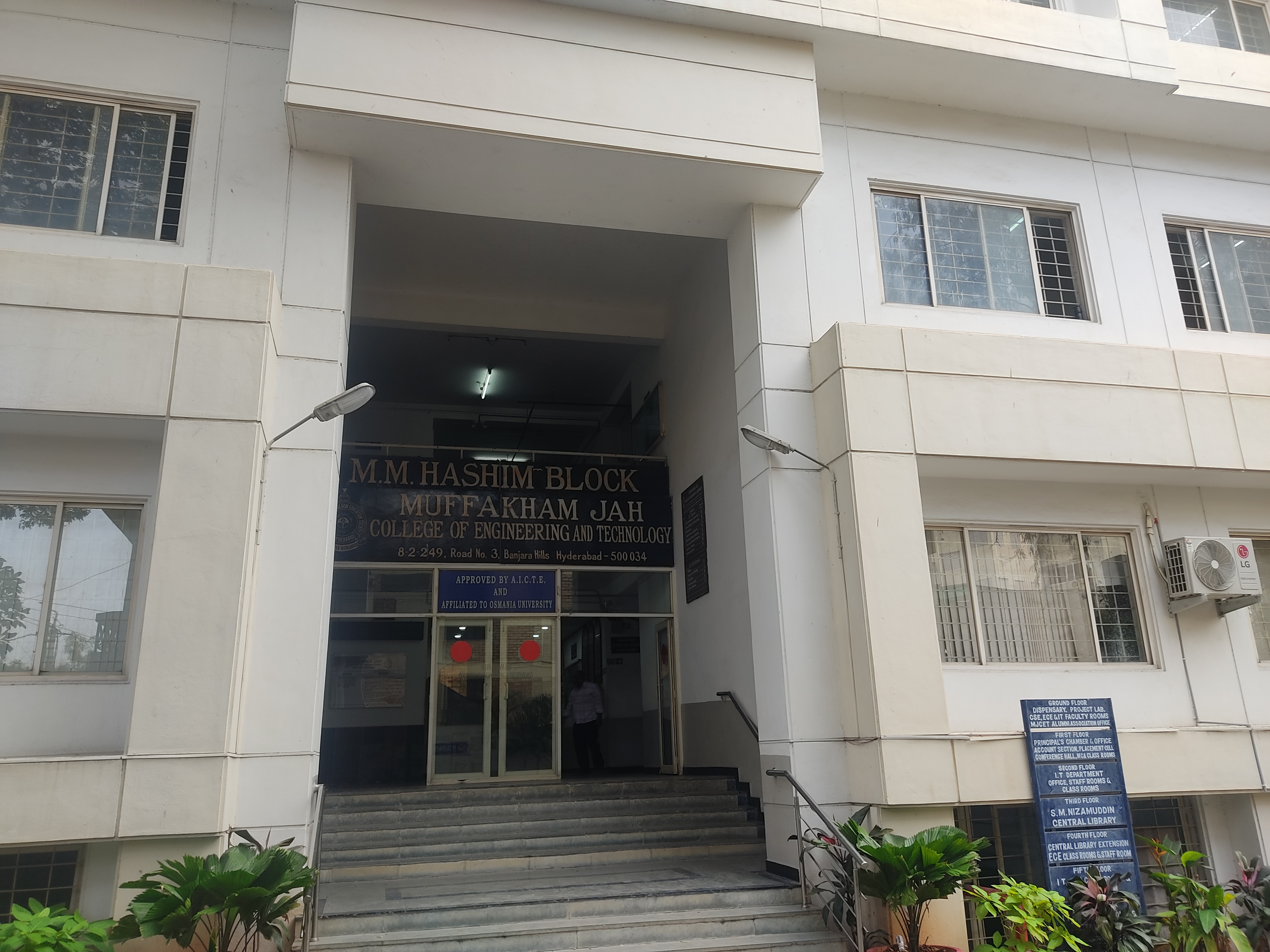
M. M. Hashim Block, Muffakham Jah College of Engg. and Tech.

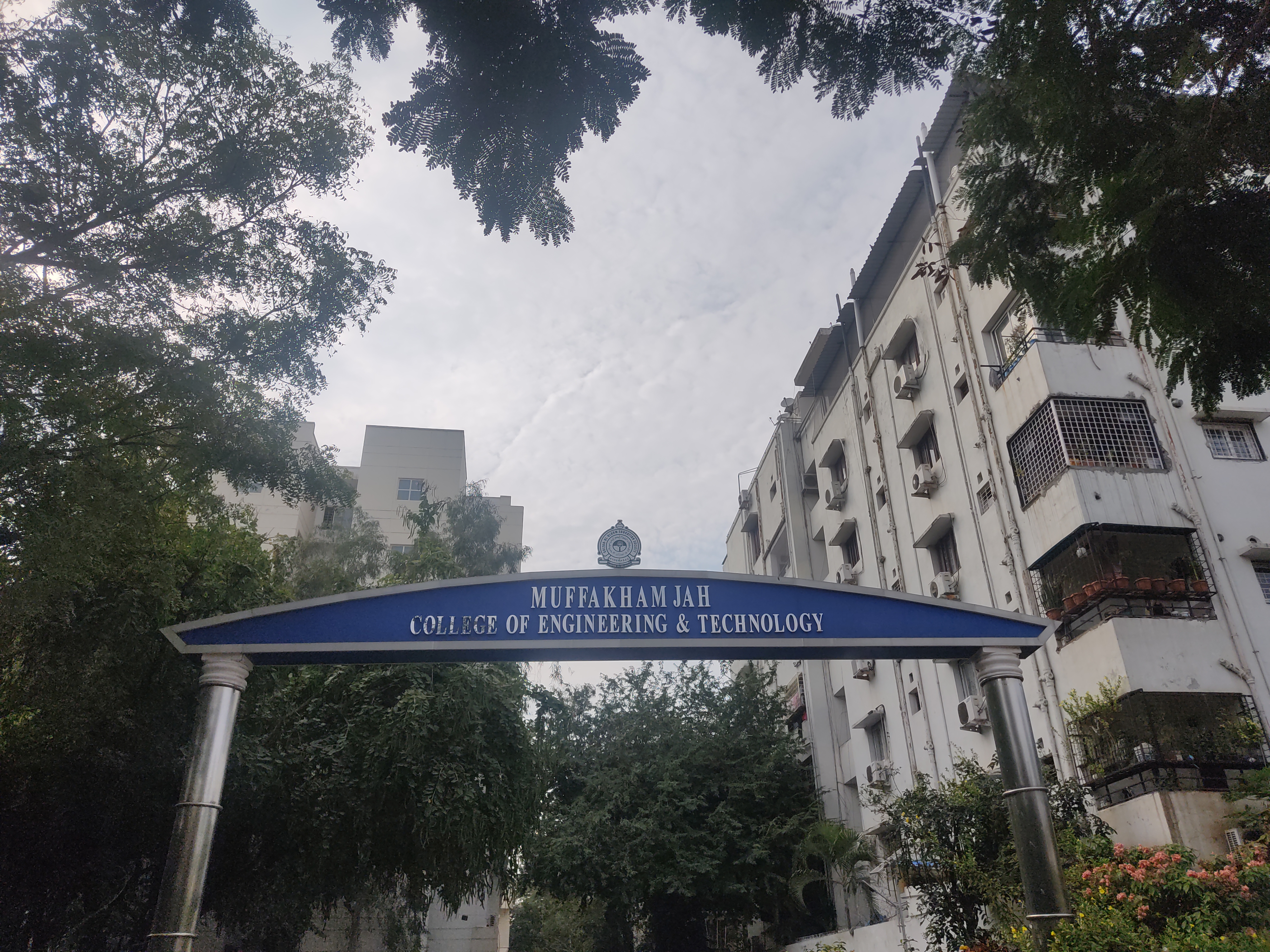
Entrance, Muffakham Jah College of Engg. and Tech.

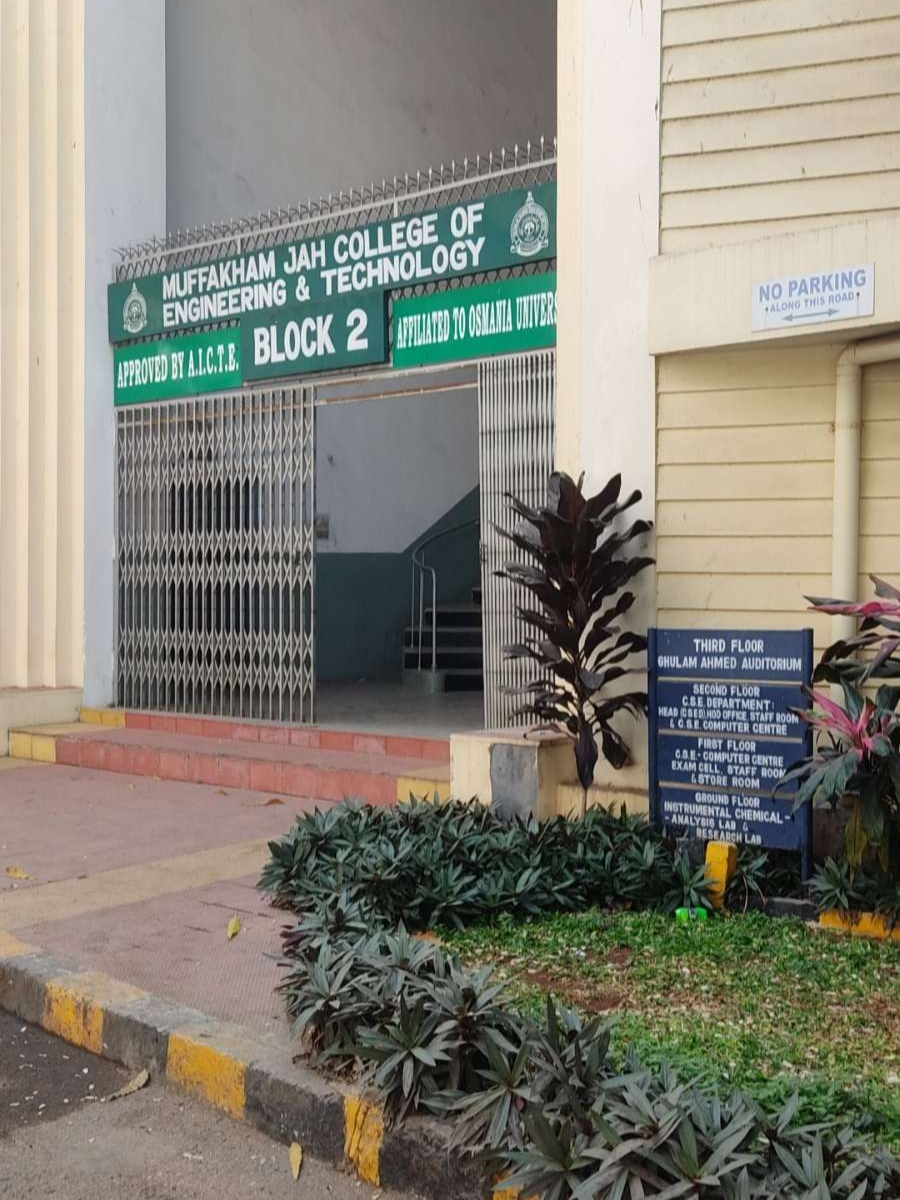
Block 2, Muffakham Jah College of Engineering & Technology

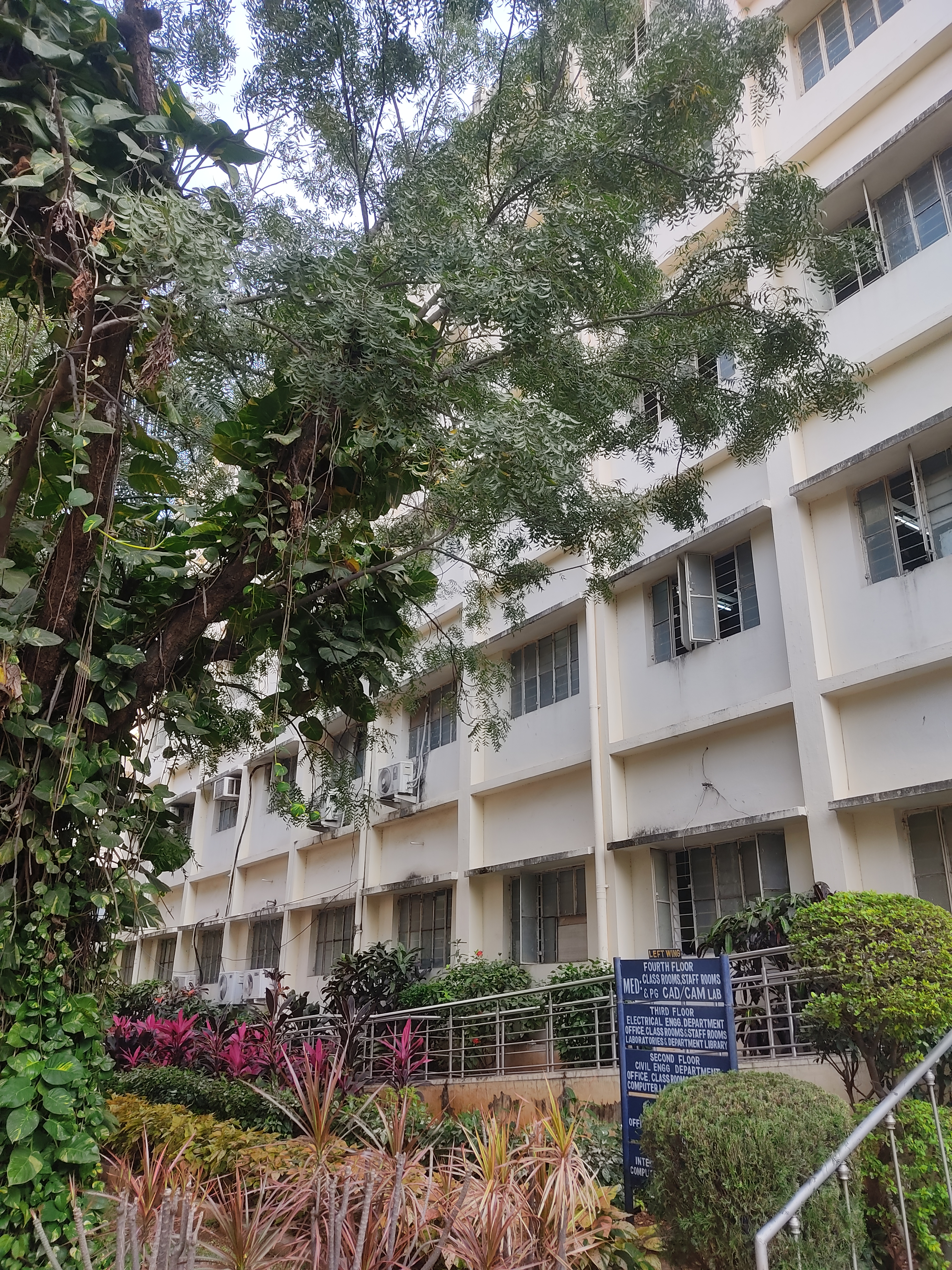
Block 1, Muffakham Jah College of Engineering & Technology

The Muffakham Jah College of Engineering and Technology (MJCET) is an engineering college located at Mount Pleasant, Road number 3, Banjara Hills, in the heart of the city of Hyderabad, Telangana, India. The college is named after Prince Muffakham Jah – grandson of the 7th Nizam – Mir Osman Ali Khan, who had donated the land for this educational institution.

MJCET is affiliated to Osmania University and is approved by the AICTE (All India Council for Technical Education). The college is run and maintained by the Sultan-ul-Uloom Educational Society. The college offers Bachelor of Engineering (B.E) courses in eight disciplines out of which seven courses - Artificial Intelligence and Data Science, Civil Engineering, Computer Science and Engineering, Electronics and Communication Engineering, Electrical and Electronics Engineering, Mechanical Engineering and Production Engineering – have been accredited by the National Board of Accreditation (NBA, AICTE) and the Institution of Engineers (India). The college offers admissions in various B.E courses through the scores obtained by the students in TS EAPCET.

== About the college ==
Established in 1980, the Muffakham Jah College of Engineering and Technology offers four year B.E. degree courses in eight engineering branches, namely, Civil Engineering, Computer Science and Engineering, Information Technology, Electrical and Electronics Engineering, Electronics and Communication Engineering, Instrumentation Engineering, Mechanical Engineering, and Production Engineering accredited by the National Board of Accreditation (NBA) and with approval from The All India Council for Technical Education (AICTE).

In addition, there are five postgraduate courses of two years' duration; M.E (CAD/CAM), M.E (Digital Systems), M.E (Structural Engineering), M.E (Power Electronics System) and M.Tech (Computer Science). An MCA of three year duration is also offered. The college houses a Research and Development cell, dedicated to providing funds for exceptional research project ideas that students may have.

== Campus ==
The campus of MJCET is located at Banjara hills in the city of Hyderabad. The campus is divided into various buildings for different departments of engineering. Block 4 is the oldest, where the college was first started in 1980. There is a separate block exclusively for workshops. These workshops consist of a wide range of machinery depending on the respective departments. The college campus also has a mosque for prayers. There are two canteens, vegetarian and non-vegetarian. There are 4 different parking areas allotted for different departments and for students and professors to separate.

== Student Activity Clubs ==
MJCET actively promotes various student branches in all engineering departments for the technical and soft skills development of the students. The various student branches of the college are

- Microsoft Student Society (MSS): The MSS MJCET Chapter is powered by Microsoft. The sole aim. of the club is to help students improve their all-round technical skills with every contemporary technology. Core members are provided access to the MSDN subscription as per their project needs. The main aim is to prepare the students to compete at the Microsoft ImagineCup.
- Team Robocon MJCET (TRM): The team also participates in the international ROBOCON event every year. In 2013 they won the award for "The Best Idea Robot" and scored 7th out of 150 teams all over India including teams from national institutes. In 2014 they won the award for "The Best Manual Robot" and won 4th out of 95 teams all over India. This club also conducts workshops on building robots where students are taught how to build robots from scratch.

Association For Computing Machinery (ACM):

- IEEE student branch: The IEEE student branch has six sub-branches under its banner some are namely the IEEE PES (Power Electronics Society), IEEE CS (Computer society) and the main IEEE student branch. All three IEEE student bodies strive for the technical development of the students of their respective departments by conducting various events like debates, group discussions, extempore and field trips.
- E-cell: The E-cell is an abbreviation for the entrepreneurship cell of MJCET. E-cell mainly focuses on harnessing the entrepreneurship and leadership qualities of the students. This is the only student body on campus that is not restricted to specific departments and is open for all departments.
- ICI: The Indian Concrete Institute Student Chapter at MJCET is run by students of the Civil Engineering dept. The Chapter conducts various technical events, workshops and field trips for the members, alongside attending outstation technical conferences. In one academic year of its inaugural, ICI has reached heights by collecting the Best Emerging Student Chapter award during the international conference by Innovative World of Concrete at HITEX.
- Society of Automotive Engineers (SAE): This student body is run and maintained by the Mechanical and Production Engineering students. their recent accomplishments include winning the Supra SAE INDIA 2012 competition held at Buddh International Circuit in Noida. and Winning Runner-up in Hill-Climb Category in BAJA SAE INDIA 2008 out of 46 teams participated.
- Engineers Without Borders MJCET: The EWB- MJCET chapter team which works with the motto of providing sustainable engineering solutions for the betterment of the underprivileged society has won second prize in the Prestigious International "Mondialogo Engineering Award" which was organized by Daimler and UNESCO in 2008. The student team had worked in collaboration with Karlsruhe German University students. The chapter guided by Prof. Ashfaque Jafari, Dean(Academics) of the college is successfully constructing a green building for its official purpose and is claimed as the first student chapter in India to go through this phase. Mrs. Ishrat Meera Mirzana and Ms. N. B. V. Lakshmi Kumari are notable advisers of the team. The team led by, Mr. Prashant is signing a Memorandum of Understanding(MoU) with the EWB chapter of the University of Connecticut(UConn). This team has won many awards for its commitment towards the betterment of society and is presently working on social projects funded by corporates and other Non-Govt Organisations (NGO's). It has indulged in many social activities like the adoption of schools, creating awareness regarding the environment and much more.

== Admissions ==
For admission to the first year of the four-year degree course in Engineering, candidates must fulfill the eligibility requirements as prescribed by the Government of Andhra Pradesh and the Osmania University. Since it is a Muslim minority college, 75% of the seats are reserved for Muslims who appear and qualify in the state-level Engineering, Agricultural and Pharmacy Common Entrance Test (EAPCET). The remaining 25% seats are filled by the College Management and NRI (Non-resident Indian) candidates. This allows Indian students who have studied abroad up to high school, and who might find it difficult to compete in the highly competitive entrance tests, to be able to study in the institution. The NRI seats require the fee for all four years to be paid in advance, and the fee is generally set upwards of $12,000 (which is about 15–20 times of the fee for other seats). The basis of admission is the successful completion of 10+2 years of school education for the NRI seats.

== Courses offered ==
MJCET offers undergraduate B.E (Bachelor Of Engineering) programs in Civil Engineering, Computer Science Engineering, Electronics and Communication Engineering, Electronics And Instrumentation Engineering, Electrical and Electronics Engineering, Information Technology, Mechanical Engineering and Mechanical Engineering with a specialization in Production Engineering.

The graduate programs are MCA (Master in Computer Applications) and M.E in CAD/CAM.

- Artificial Intelligence and Machine Learning
- Artificial Intelligence and Data Science
- Information technology
- Civil Engineering
- Electrical and Electronics Engineering
- Mechanical Engineering
- Computer Science Engineering
- Production Engineering
- Master Of Computer Application (M.C.A)
- Electronics and communication engineering
- Instrumentation engineering

== Fees ==
- The fee charged is INR 1,25,000 per year for all students in all branches of engineering as per the revised fee structure by the state government in 2022.
- NRI fee for the four-year B.E course is Rs 1 to 2 lakhs per year
