= Urdu Hall =

Language institution in India

Urdu Hall is an Urdu language promotion institution located in Hyderabad, India. It has a library and archives of old Urdu literature.

Urdu Hall was inaugurated by independent India's first Prime Minister, Jawaharlal Nehru, in December 1955 at Himayathnagar, Hyderabad. Noted Urdu poet Makhdoom Mohiuddin was associated with the center.

== The Center ==
A chapter of Anjuman Taraqui Urdu is located here. A day and evening college is located on the premises.
