= H.E.H. the Nizam's Charitable Trust =

Non-profit organization

H.E.H. The Nizam’s Charitable Trust is a non-profit organization. It is currently headed by Prince Muffakham Jah - the grandson of 7th Nizam Mir Osman Ali Khan. The trust grants scholarships to around 2,000 students every year. The beneficiaries include students belonging to the states of Andhra Pradesh and Telangana from 5th to 10th class, intermediate level, and degree students.

== Noted beneficiaries ==
=== Sarojini Naidu ===
The Nightingale of India Sarojini Naidu was one of the beneficiaries of this trust, which gave her a chance to study in England, first at King's College, London and later at Girton College, Cambridge.

== Controversy ==
The officials of the Trust alleged that the government officials constantly harassed them by sending baseless notices. In one of the cases, a Supreme Court of India Judge said:

"This is indeed a Secular Comprehensive Public Charitable Trust which, unfortunately, had a prolonged litigation directing towards bigger scope for corruption by the Government ministers and officials."

== See also ==
- Nizam's Rubath
