= Armida Fernandez =

Indian neonatologist (born 1943)

- Fernandez in 2026
- Born: 1943 (age 82–83); Dharwad
- Occupations: Neonatologist and Pediatrician
- Known for: Asia's first human milk bank
- Father: Armando Menezes
- Relatives: George Menezes (brother); Nicolau Menezes (uncle)
- Awards: Padma Shri (2026)

Armida Fernandez (born 1943) is an Indian neonatologist and pediatrician who drastically cut infant mortality. She is known for establishing Asia's first human milk bank at the Lokmanya Tilak Municipal General Hospital in Mumbai in 1989. In 2026, she was awarded the Padma Shri, India's fourth-highest civilian honour, for her contributions to medicine.

== Early and personal life ==
Armida (lower center) with her sister Ada, mother Matilda and cousin Maria de Luz at their home in Dharwad, Karnataka, mid 1940s

Armando Menezes and his family, c. 1940s

Armida Menezes was born in 1943 in Dharwad in Karnataka. She is the daughter of Armando Menezes, an Indian civil servant, writer, academic and poet who wrote in English. She completed her MBBS in Hubli and her post-graduation at KEM Hospital, Bombay.

Her family is from Divar and she was one of seven siblings, with five brothers and two sisters. She was married to Rui Fernandez, who died in 2023. Writer George Menezes was her brother.

== Career ==
In 1977, Fernandez became the head of the Department of Neonatology at Lokmanya Tilak Municipal General Hospital (Sion Hospital). During her tenure, she observed high mortality rates among infants whose mothers could not breastfeed due to illness or other complications. At the time, infants were often fed commercial formula or cow's milk, which frequently led to infections.

In 1989, she founded Asia's first human milk bank at Sion Hospital. The facility was designed to collect, pasteurize, and store donated breast milk to provide essential nutrition to premature and vulnerable infants. Despite initial skepticism from the medical community regarding the safety and cultural acceptance of donated milk, the initiative proved successful in reducing infant infection rates at the hospital.

After retiring from Sion Hospital, in 1999, Fernandez founded SNEHA (Society for Nutrition, Education and Health Action), a non-profit organization focused on improving health outcomes for women and children in urban slums. In 2000, Fernandez she was chosen as the president of the Indian Academy of Pediatrics in Mumbai.

== Awards and Recognition ==
The President of India, Smt. Droupadi Murmu presenting the Padma Shri Award to Dr. Armida Fernandez at the Civil Investiture Ceremony-II at Rashtrapati Bhavan, in New Delhi on June 23, 2026

- Padma Shri (2026) – Awarded by the Government of India for her pioneering work in neonatology and public health.
- IAP-FIAB (2005) – Indian Academy of Pediatrics (IAP) Fellowship of the Indian Academy of Pediatrics (FIAP) Awardee
- Ashoka Fellow (2004) – Ashoka | United States
