= Nizam's Rubath =

Accommodation for pilgrims in Mecca

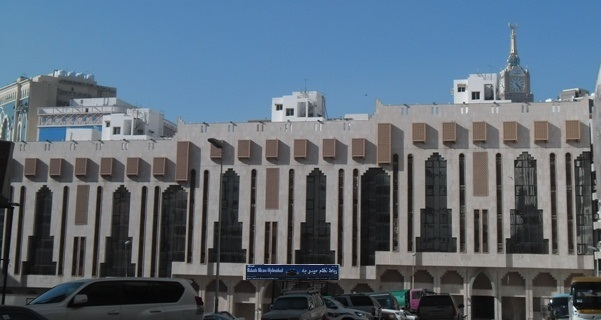
Leftover buildings of Nizam's Rubath in Mecca city

The Nizam's Rubath is an accommodation building for pilgrims travelling to Mecca during their pilgrimage. It was purchased by the Nizam for the people of Hyderabad State. In 2017, a total of 3,400 pilgrims were selected for free accommodation.

Located about 2 km from the Grand Mosque of Mecca, the Rubath now comes under the "AWQAF (Endowment) Committee" of The H.E.H. the Nizam's Charitable Trust.

== History ==
Originally 42 Rubath buildings were purchased in 1860 by Nizam Afzal ad-Dawlah, Asaf Jah V for the people of Hyderabad State, but most were demolished after the expansion of the Masjid al-Haram in Mecca. The 140-year-old Rubath today comprises only three buildings, containing 500 rooms that can accommodate a minimum of about 1,200 people. The people who use the facilities of Rubath do not have to pay any fee.

Pilgrims from the erstwhile Nizam's dominion (Hyderabad State) were accepted here. This area corresponds to parts of today's Telangana, Marathwada (Central Maharashtra) and Hyderabad-Karnataka (Northern Karnataka) regions who can apply for the Rubath accommodation. Since there is a great demand for accommodation during the Hajj season, the pilgrims are selected through a draw of applicants.

The Rubath is located on Ibrahim Al Khaleel Street, Al Misfalah in Mecca. It has capacity for nearly 500 people.

== See also ==
- Nizams of Hyderabad
