= Durru Shehvar Children's & General Hospital =

Princess Durru Shehvar Children's & General Hospital
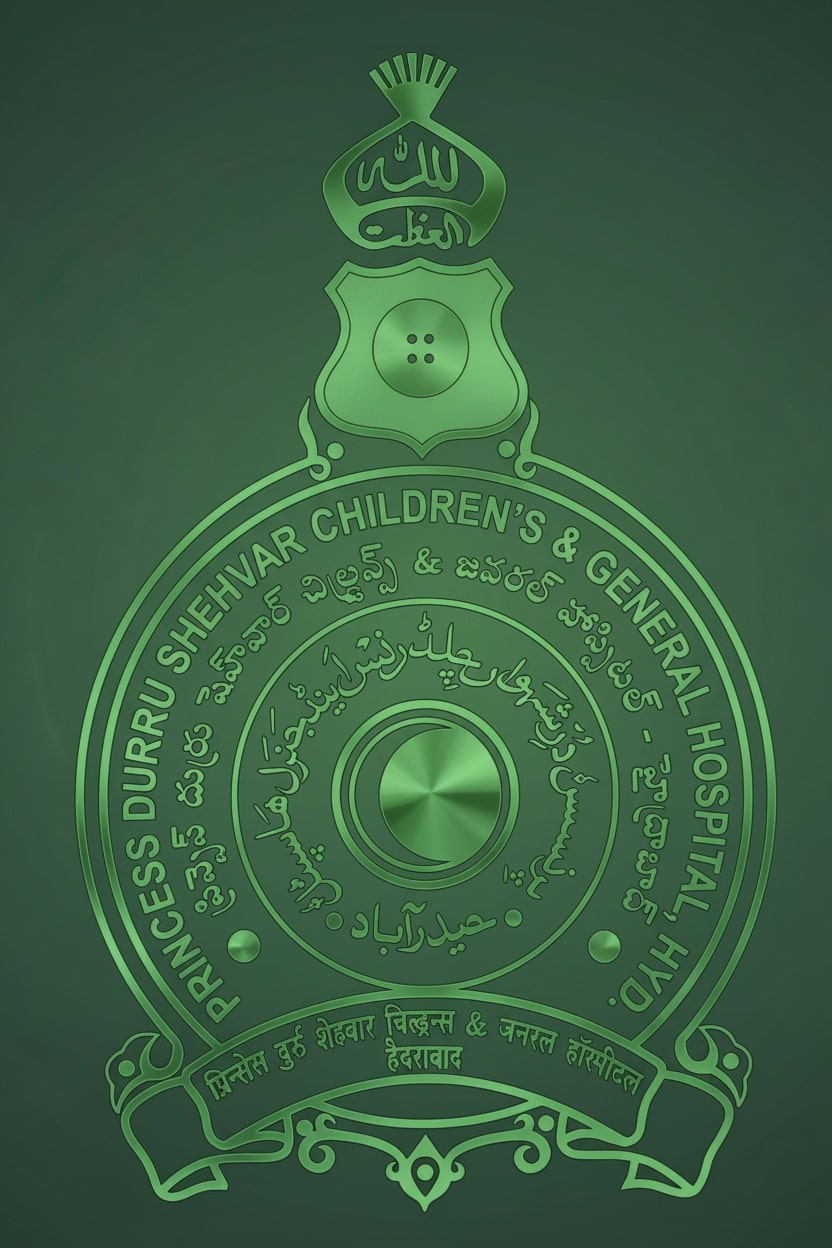

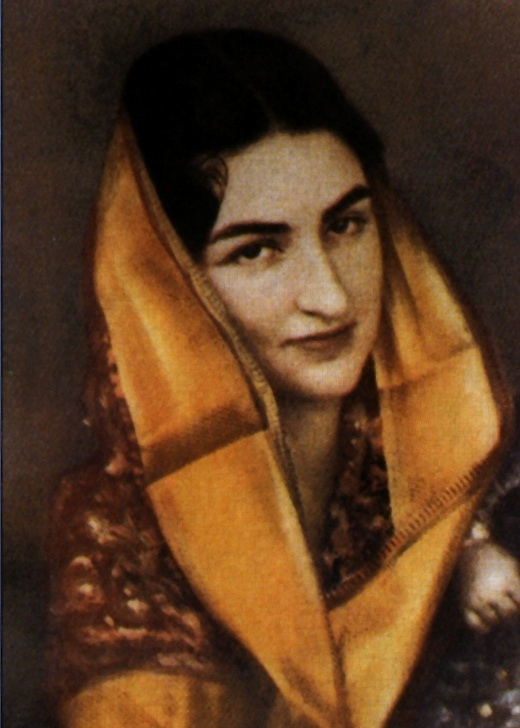
- Founder: Princess Durru Shehvar.

Geography
- Location: 22-3-660/A, Purani Haveli, Hyderabad 500002, Telangana, India
- Coordinates: 17.367312°N 78.482658°E

Organisation
- Care system: Secondary.
- Type: Multispecialty, (Flagship departments Neonatal care Paediatrics Gynaecology & Obstetrics)
- Affiliated university: National Board of Examinations in Medical Sciences N.B.E.M.S

Services
- Emergency department: Paediatric, Neonatology and Adult Medical Emergency 24 Hours Services.
- Beds: 200

History
- Opened: 18 March 1989. Founded by: Princess Durru Shehvar Chairman: Prince Muffakham Jah Chief Executive Officer: CEO Dr.Dilip Mathai pdscgh.org

Princess Durru Shehvar Children's & General Hospital (PDSC&GH) is a non-profit, non-governmental hospital in Hyderabad Telangana India.

The 200-bed facility is spread over an area of 11,300 square yards (9,400 m^{2}). Additionally, there is an 8-bed pediatric intensive care unit (PICU) with a neonatal intensive care unit (NICU) equipped with neonatal ventilators, phototherapy units and centralised cardiac monitors. The intensive and critical care department offers 24-hour services to all patient groups with chronic disease conditions requiring life support. Princess Durru Shehvar Children's and General Hospital is recognized as one of the primary centers for pediatric care in Hyderabad, offering comprehensive pediatric and neonatal services

== History ==
The Princess Durru Shehvar Children's Medical Aid Society was established in 1983, which opened the hospital on March 18, 1989, primarily as a children's hospital. The foundation stone was laid by its namesake, Princess Durru Shehvar, mother of the society's chair Prince Muffakham Jah.The hospital later began to provide medical care to pregnant women, as well as prenatal and postnatal care, and eventually expanded its services to become a general hospital. The society opened a college of nursing in 2003.

== Hospital Accreditation & Academics ==
“The NABH is an autonomous healthcare accreditation body that operates in alignment with national healthcare objectives.It is not a government department, and hospital accreditation remains a strictly voluntary process".

This hospital is accredited by National Accreditation Board for Hospitals & Healthcare Providers

In summary, NABH seeks to optimize the overall functioning of a hospital.

Princess Durru Shehvar Children's & General Hospital has been accredited by the National Board of Examinations in Medical Science (NBEMS), New Delhi for imparting training on different broad specialty DNB programs.

The duration of the course for Post MBBS candidates is for 3 years. Candidates who have already completed a recognized PG Diploma program of 2 years in a particular specialty can undergo a 2 years Post Diploma DNB Programme in the same specialty.

Dr. Saud Ahmed Khan is the administrator of Academics, IT, and National accreditation board for hospitals and Healthcare providers Quality department.

== Nursing College ==
The Princess Durru Shehvar Children's Medical Aid Society (PDSCMAS) endowed from the main stream of H.E.H. the Nizam's Charitable Trust was founded on 19thJanuary 1983 to cater to the health and educational needs of the people of the local community. To meet these objectives, the Princess Durru Shehvar Children's and General Hospital (PDSC&GH) was established on 16 March 1989.

== Green Zone Hospital ==
The hospital grounds include gardens and trees, providing open outdoor spaces for patients.

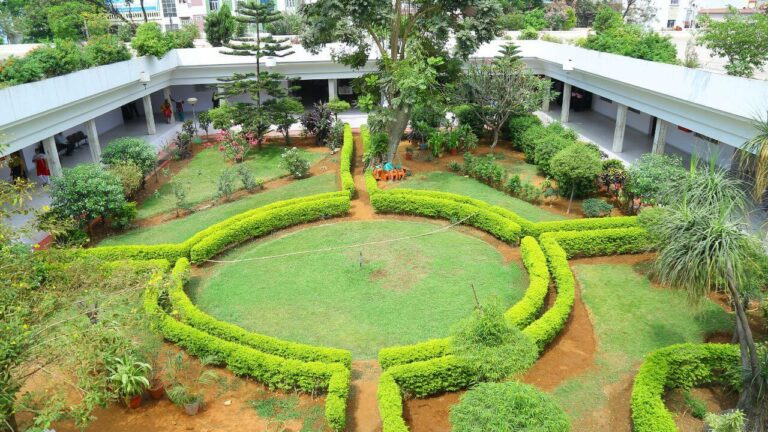
Princess Durru Shehvar Children's & General Hospital

== Facilities ==
- CT Scanning
- Ultrasound Scanning
- World-class ICU & NICU
- Advanced Operation Theatres
- Infection Control Systems
- Emergency & Casualty Department
- 24/7 Pharmacy with all Medical and Surgical
- Robust Electronic Medical Record system
- Canteen for patients and visitors.
- Advanced Diagnostic Laboratory with integrated lab and storage services
- Blood Bank – Advanced technology used in blood collection, storage, and distribution.

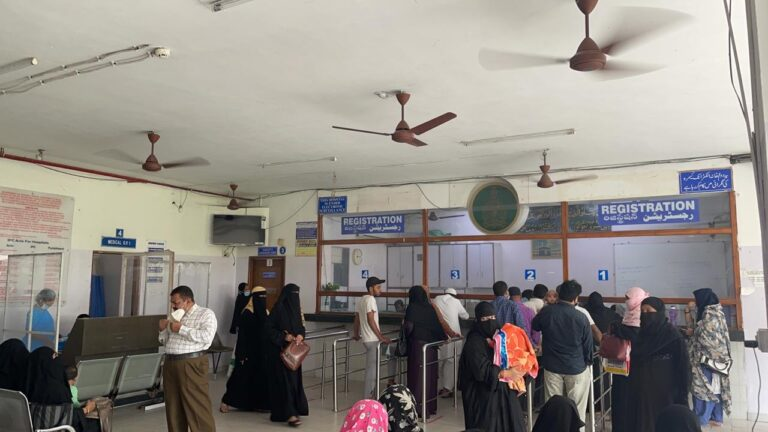
Princess Durru Shehvar Children's and General Hospital Out Patient

Medical services are subsidised by the government to make the healthcare affordable and accessible to all sections of society.

== Health Insurance Facility ==
The hospital has all major insurance companies empanelled for cashless treatment.

== Specialties and departments ==
- General Medicine
- Emergency medical services
- Pulmonology
- Pulmonary medicine
- Cardiology (non-interventional)
- Cardiology (Pediatric)
- Gastroenterology
- Surgical Gastroenterology
- Hepatology
- Hepatobiliary Liver Surgery
- Laparoscopy Surgery, Minimally Invasive Surgery.
- Endocrinology
- Neurosurgery
- Oncology
- Neurology
- Radiology
- Pathology
- General surgery
- Internal medicine
- Orthopedic surgery Orthopaedic and fracture treatment
- Otolaryngology E.N.T (Ear, Nose, Throat)
- Nephrology
- Paediatrics, Paediatric surgery
- Neonatal Intensive Care Unit
- Paediatric Intensive Care Unit
- Dermatology
- Pathology
- Physiotherapy
- Reproductive health, Infertility Center
- Gynaecology and Obstetrics
- Urology
- Infertility
- Nutriton and Dietetics
- Dental Surgery

== Administration ==
The hospital is managed by the Princess Durru Shehvar Children's Medical Aid Society, which has non-profit laws of India|80G non-profit status. The board members of the society are 1.Syed Anis Hussain 2.Mahapara Ali 3.Mohammed Shafiq Uz Zaman 4.Dr.Sudhir Naik 5.Dr.Dilip Mathai 6.Bakhtiar Ahmed Ansari 7.Dr.Habeebuddin and the secretary of the society is Mr. Najeeb Ullah Khan, which has 80G non-profit status.

Dr.Dilip Mathai is the CEO (Chief Executive Officer) and Dr. Fazeelath Ali Khan is the administrator and medical Superintendent.

The hospital aims to develop into a tertiary healthcare facility and a preferred healthcare provider in Hyderabad by promoting values of caring, service, innovation, and excellence.

K.G.M Faizani is the finance manager and Shaik Saleem is the operations development and Head Human resource manager
