= Muffakham Jah =

2nd grandson of 7th Nizam of Hyderabad

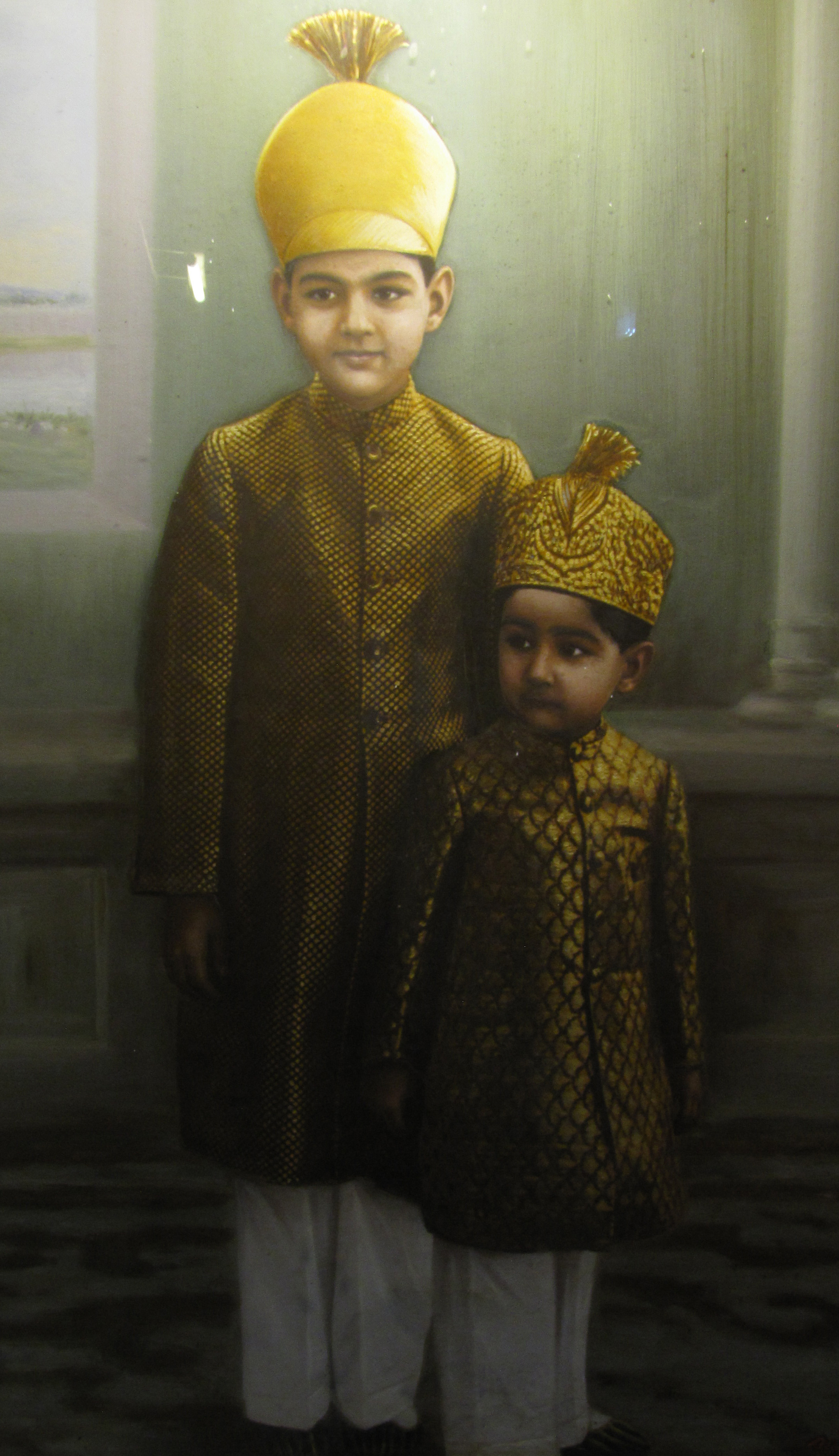
- Muffakham Jah with his elder brother Mukarram Jah
- Born: 27 February 1939 (age 87); Nice, France
- Spouse: Esin Incealemdaroglu
- Issue: Rafat Jah; Farhat Jah
Names
- Muffakham Jah Nawab Walashan Sahebzada Mir Karamath Ali Khan Siddiqi Bayafendi Bahadur
- House: House of Asaf Jah
- Father: Azam Jah
- Mother: Dürrüşehvar Sultan
- Religion: Sunni Islam

Muffakham Jah (born 27 February 1939) is a member of House of Asaf Jah. He is the son of Prince Azam Jah and Dürrüşehvar Sultan. He is the grandson of both Osman Ali Khan, the seventh and final Nizam of the erstwhile Hyderabad princely state, and Abdulmejid II, the last Ottoman caliph.

== Personal life and Legacy ==
He is married to Princess Esin Incealemdaroglu. They have two sons, Rafat and Farhat Jah, and live in Bayswater, London. Muffakham Jah had an older brother, Mukarram Jah. He is the founder of Muffakham Jah College of Engineering and Technology and chairman of Princess Durru Shehvar Children's & General Hospital

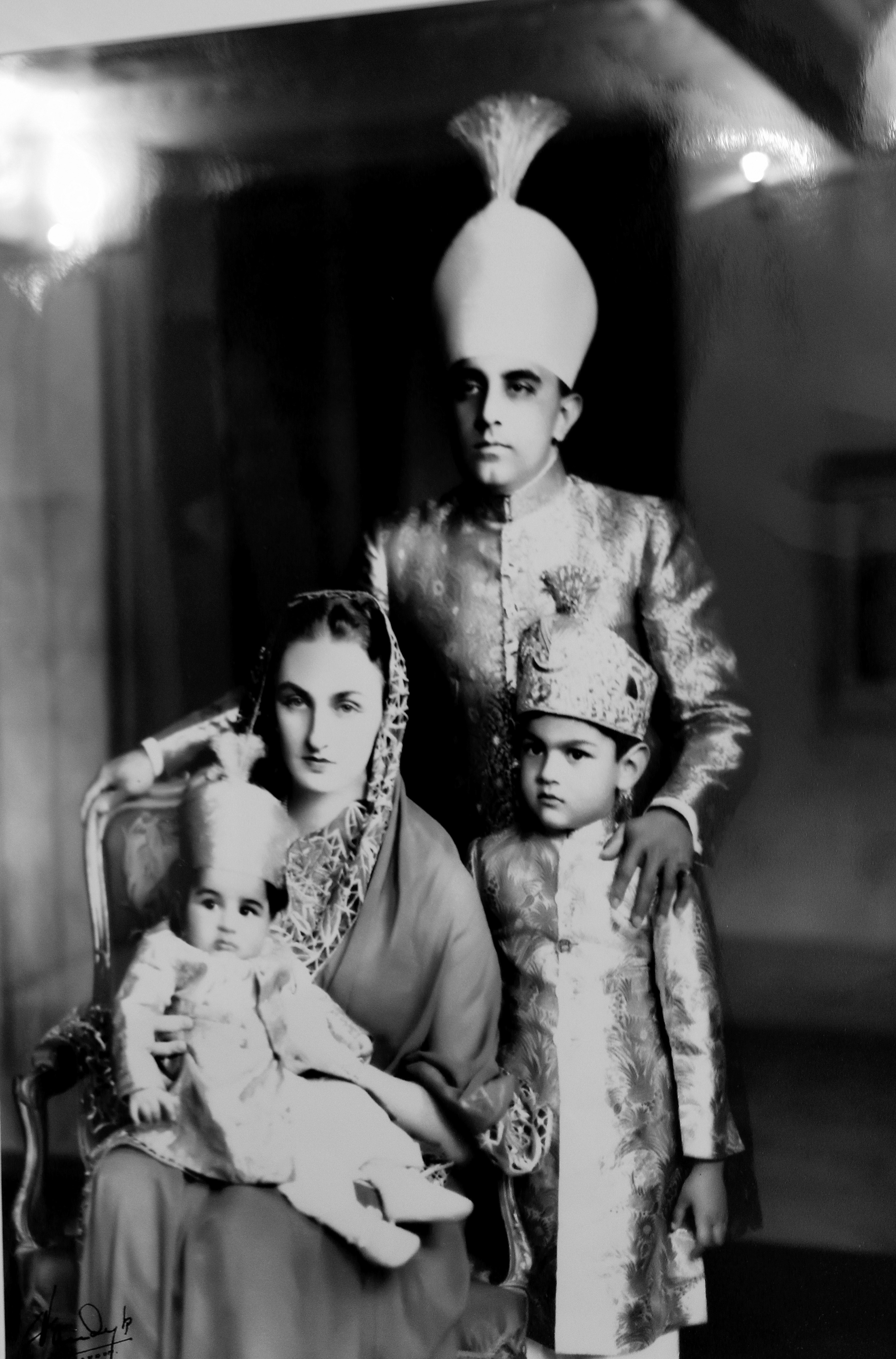

He is the founder and chairman of Princess Esin Women's Educational Centre and it works under the Nizamia Hyderabad Women's Association Trust. The Trust was established in 1999 to support women through education and social development and Princess esin schools.

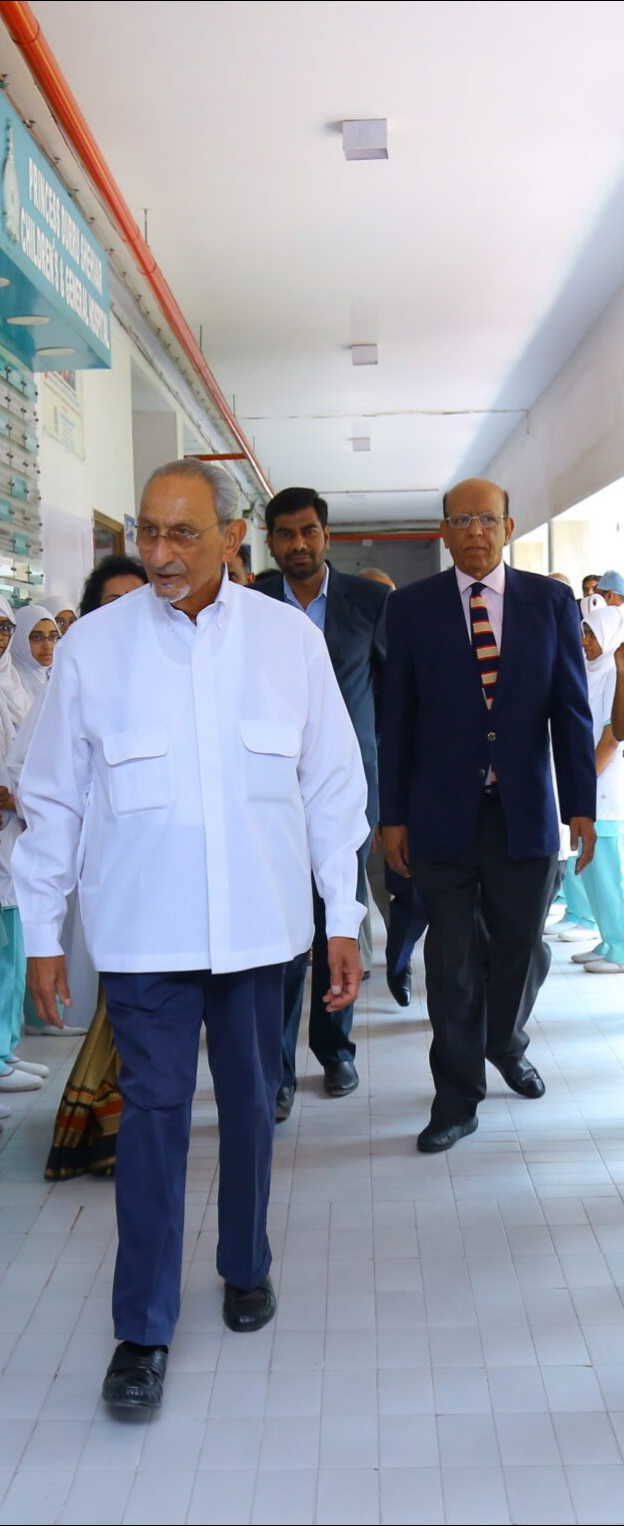
Chairman of Princess Durru Shehvar Children's & General Hospital

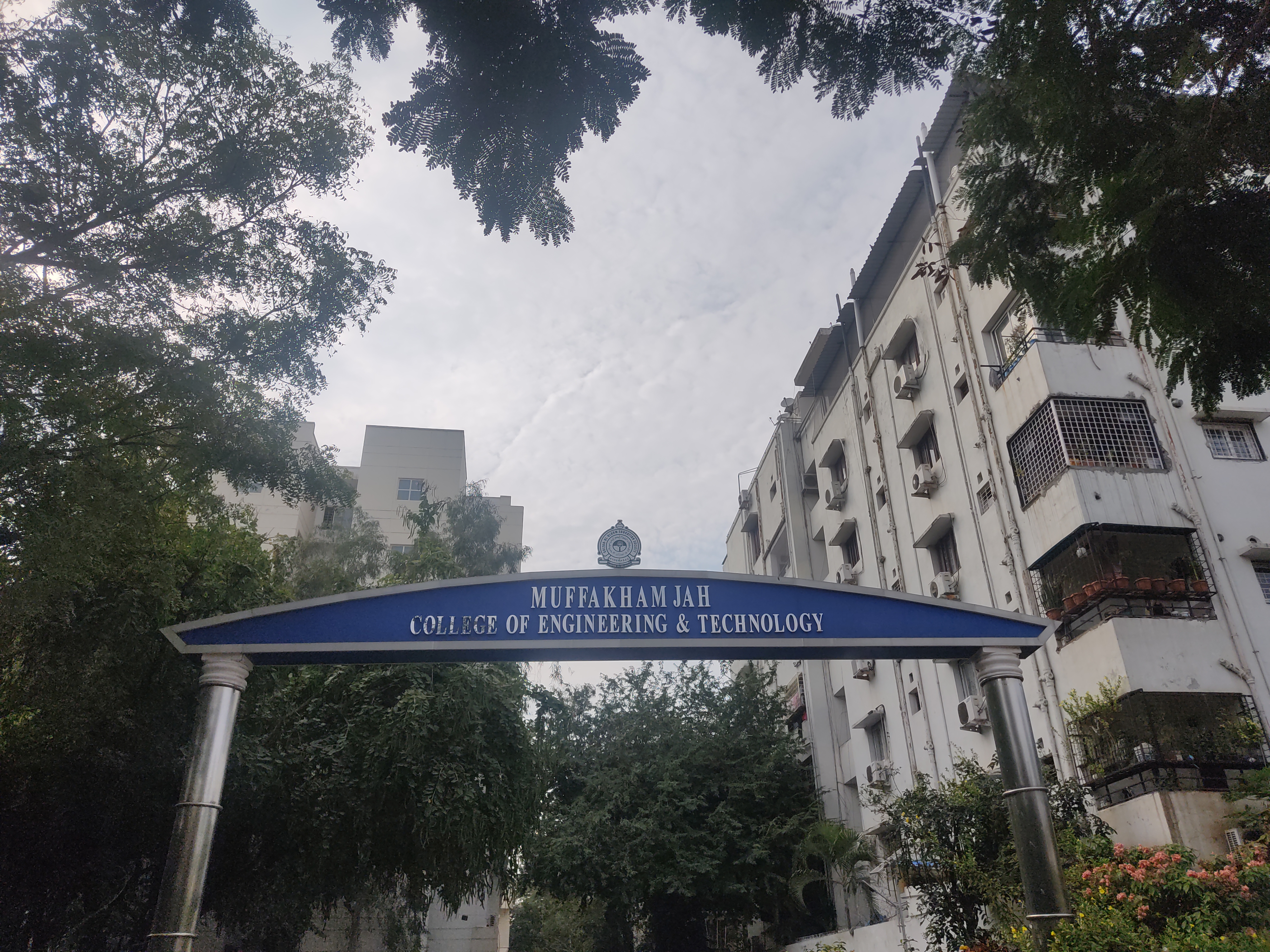
Entrance, Muffakham Jah College of Engg. and Tech.

== See also ==
- Nizam of Hyderabad
- Muffakham Jah College of Engineering and Technology
- Asaf Jahi Dynasty
- H.E.H. the Nizam's Charitable Trust
- Moazzam Jah – Indian prince (1907–1987)
