= Dürrüşehvar Sultan =

Ottoman princess (1914–2006)

- Princess of Berar and Imperial Princess of the Ottoman Empire
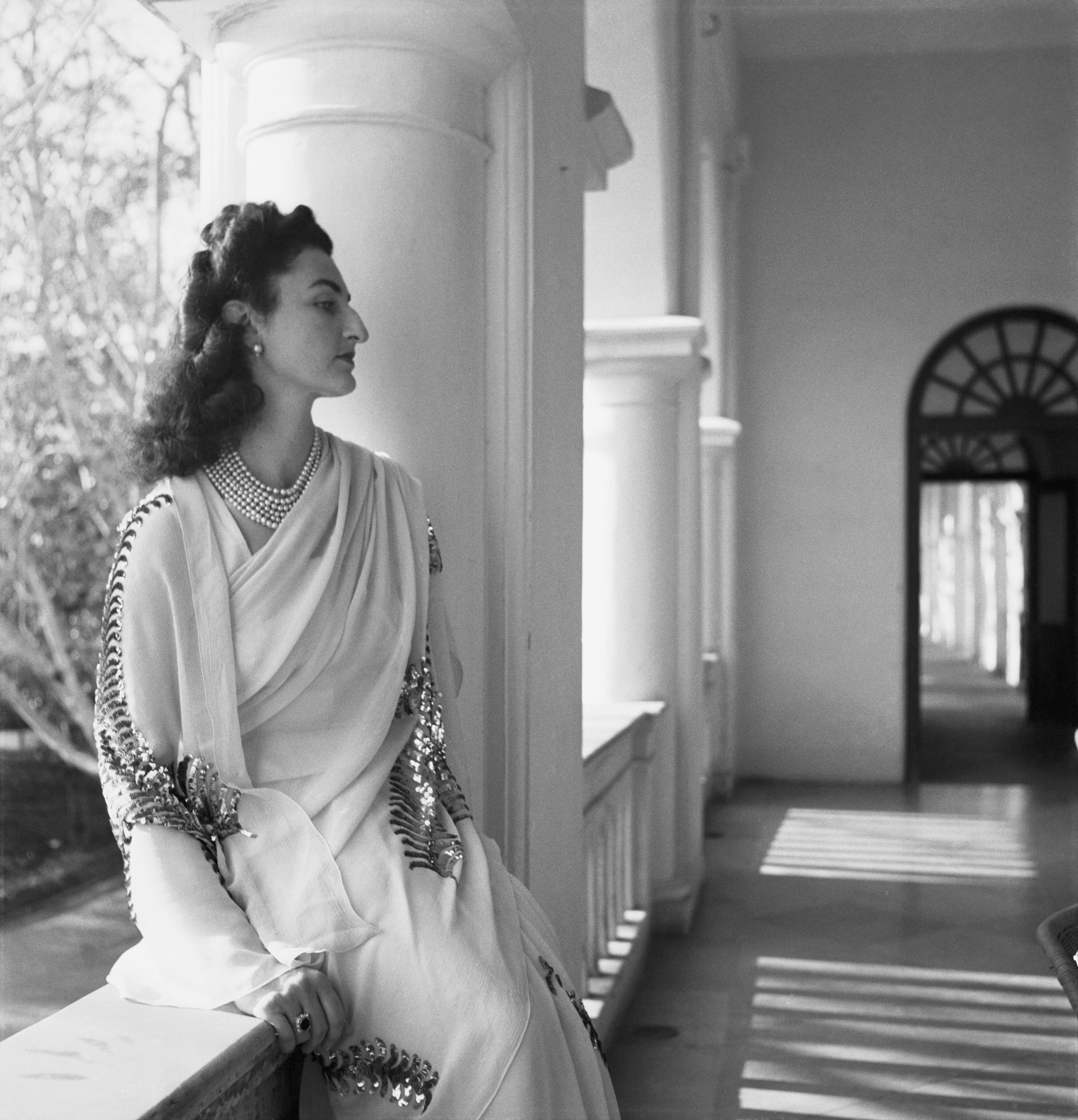
- Dürrüşehvar Sultan by Cecil Beaton
- Born: 26 January 1914; Çamlıca Palace, Üsküdar, Constantinople, Ottoman Empire (present day Istanbul, Turkey)
- Died: 7 February 2006 (aged 92); London, England
- Burial: Brookwood Cemetery
- Spouse: Azam Jah (m. 1931; div. 1954)
- Issue: Mukarram Jah; Muffakham Jah
Names
- Turkish: Hatice Hayriye Ayşe Dürrüşehvar Sultan; Ottoman Turkish: خدیجه خیریه عائشه درشهوار سلطان
- Dynasty: Ottoman (by birth); Asaf Jahi (by marriage)
- Father: Abdulmejid II
- Mother: Mehisti Hanım
- Religion: Sunni Islam

Hatice Hayriye Ayşe Dürrüşehvar Sultan (Ottoman Turkish: خدیجه خیریه عائشه درشهوار سلطان; 26 January 1914 – 7 February 2006), after marriage named Durru Shehvar Durdana Begum Sahiba, Princess of Berar; was an Ottoman princess by birth and Hyderabadi princess by marriage. She was the only daughter of Abdulmejid II, who was the last heir apparent to the Ottoman Imperial throne and the last Caliph of the Ottoman Caliphate.

== Early life ==
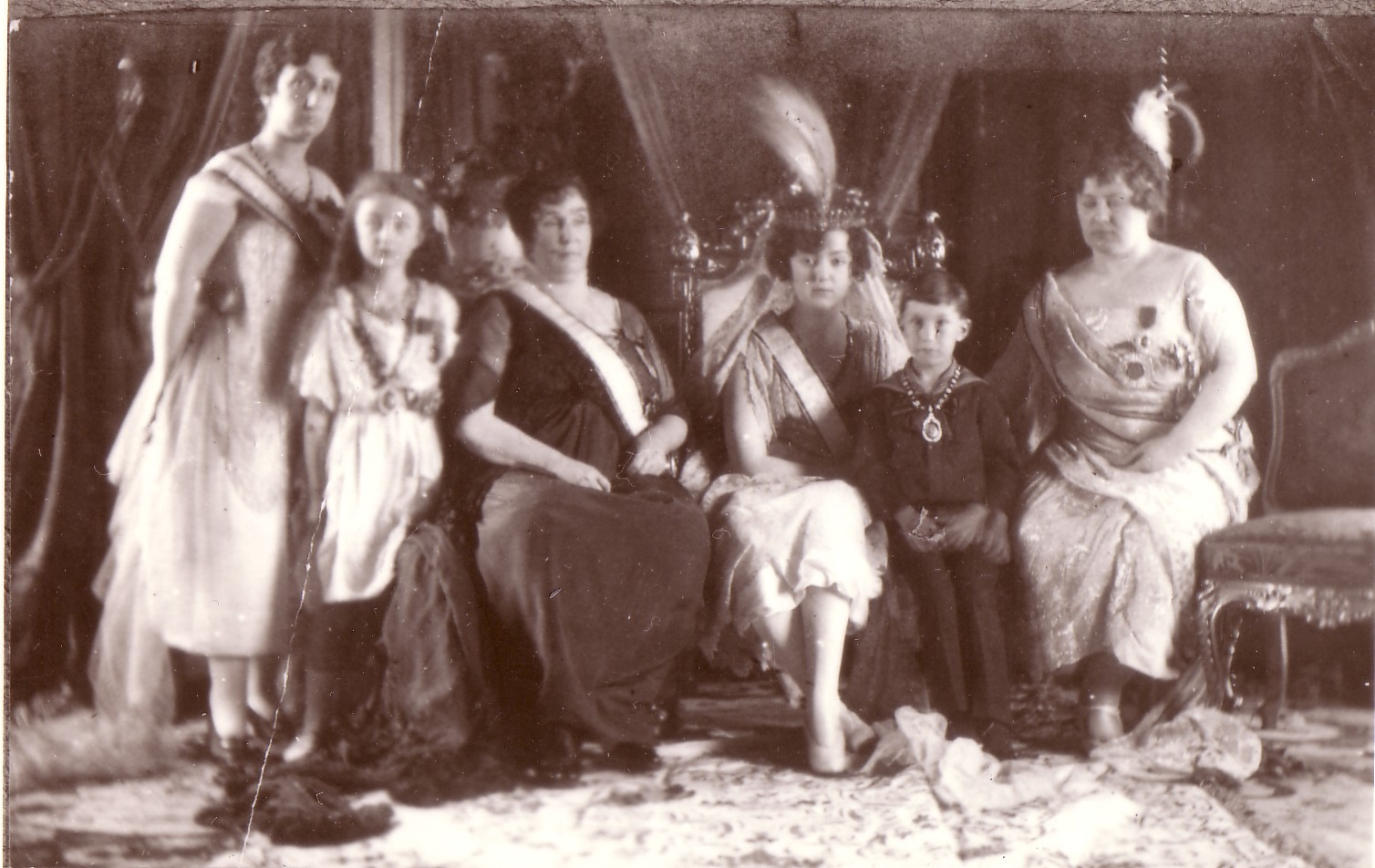
Dürrüşehvar (second from left) at the wedding of Sabiha Sultan, April 1920

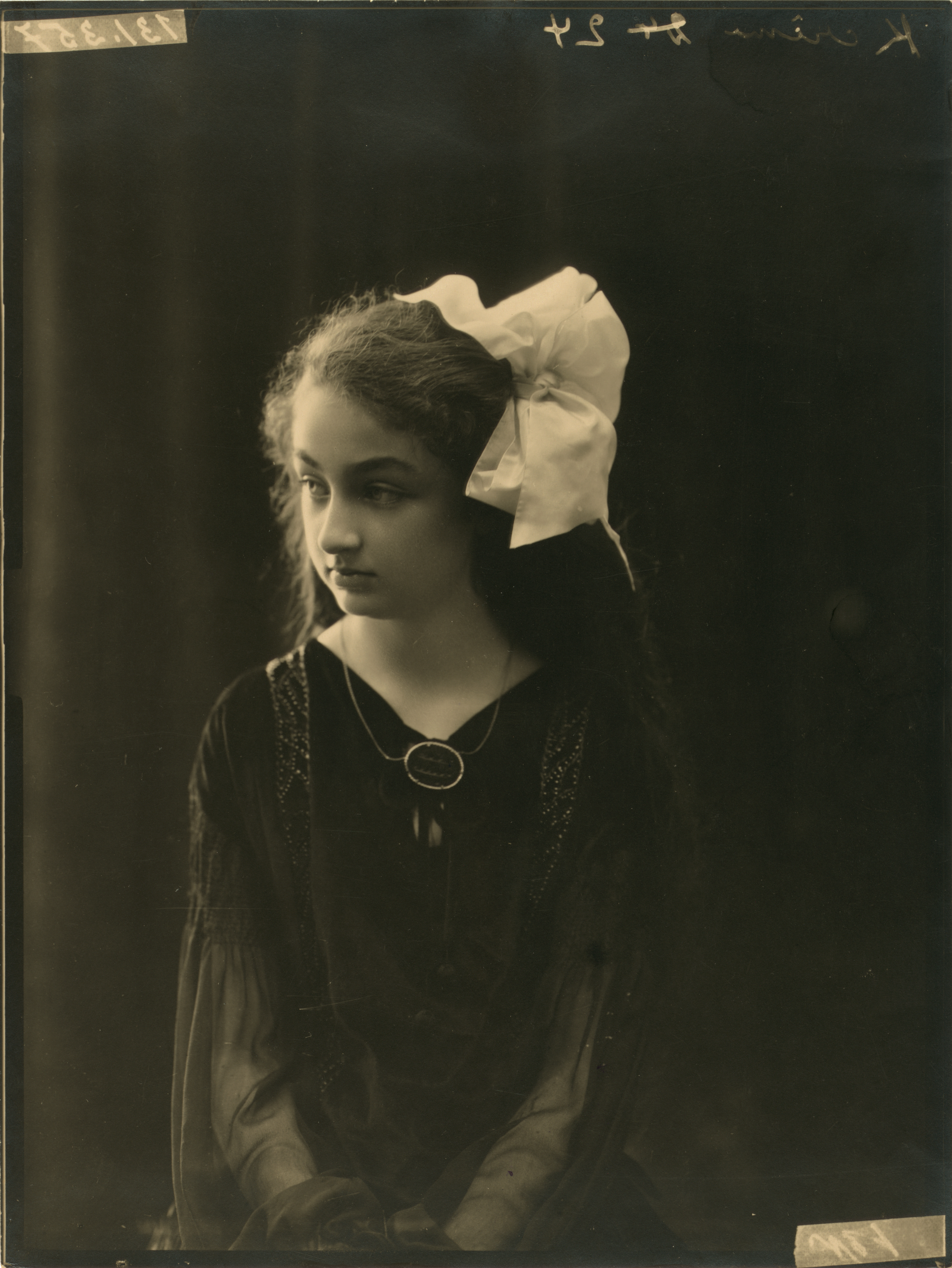
Dürrüşehvar at nine and a half years old, 1923

Dürrüşehvar Sultan was born on 26 January 1914 at the Çamlıca Palace in Üsküdar, then part of İstanbul, when the Ottoman Caliphate was passing through its last phase. Her father was the future Caliph Abdulmejid II, son of Sultan Abdulaziz and Hayranidil Kadın. Her mother was Mehisti Hanım, daughter of Hacımaf Akalsba and Safiye Hanım. She had a half-brother, Şehzade Ömer Faruk, from her father's first consort.

Upon the exile of the imperial family in March 1924, Dürrüşehvar and her family settled in Nice, France. The British Red Crescent Society, friendly with the deposed ruler, appealed to Muslim rulers around the world to come to the aid of the impoverished Caliph. Persuaded by Maulana Shaukat Ali and his brother, Maulana Mohammad Ali Jauhar, Mir Osman Ali Khan, Asaf Jah VII the last Nizam of the Hyderabad State of India decided to send a life-time monthly pension of 300 pounds to the deposed Caliph, and allowances to several individuals in the family.

== Marriage ==
As a teenager, Dürrüşehvar's beauty attracted many suitors, despite belonging to a fallen dynasty. She was sought by the Shah of Persia and King Fuad I of Egypt as a bride for their respective heirs, Mohammed Reza Pahlavi and Farouk, and by Prince Azam Jah (1907–1970), the eldest son and heir of Nizam Mir Osman Ali Khan. In 1930, Şehzade Mehmed Abid, son of Sultan Abdul Hamid II and Saliha Naciye Hanım also asked for her hand in marriage. However, her father refused, on the grounds of Dürrüşehvar being under age, but in reality Abdülmecid had already decided to marry her off to the eldest son of the Nizam.

In 1931, her father arranged her marriage to Azam Jah, the eldest son and heir to Mir Osman Ali Khan (7th Nizam of Hyderabad Deccan). However, fifty thousand pounds in mahr was demanded for her, which the Nizam considered too much. Upon the intervention of Shaukat Ali, he proposed to offer, for the same mahr, also the hand of Mahpeyker Hanımsultan to the Nizam's younger son Moazzam Jah. The Nizam readily agreed and sent his two sons to France to be married. However, when they arrived in France, Şehzade Osman Fuad, his wife Kerime Hanim and his half-sister Adile Sultan arranged for Moazzam to meet Nilüfer Hanımsultan, Adile's daughter. Nilüfer was so beautiful that Moazzam fell in love with her at first sight, and immediately decided to break off his engagement to Mahpeyker to marry her instead.

A day before the wedding, the princes arrived in Nice from London by express train, and stayed at the Hotel Negresco. On 12 November 1931, aged seventeen, Dürrüşehvar married Azam Jah, at Villa Carabacel in Nice. The Nizam's younger son was married to Dürrüşehvar's cousin Nilüfer. The marriage was performed by Damad Mehmed Şerif Pasha, husband of Abdulmejid's half-sister Emine Sultan. The local newspapers were full of photographs of the Indian princes when they arrived for the weddings, with headlines like A Thousand and One Nights and A Muslim Wedding. On that occasion, Dürrüşehvar received a diamond tiara as a gift from her aunt Nazime Sultan. After the wedding the princes took their brides and the entourage back to the hotel where they had stayed. After the religious ceremony, the newlyweds went to the British consulate to complete their civil marriage, and validate their prenuptial agreement, according to which, in the event of divorce or death of her husband, Dürrüşehvar would receive 200,000 dollars in compensation.

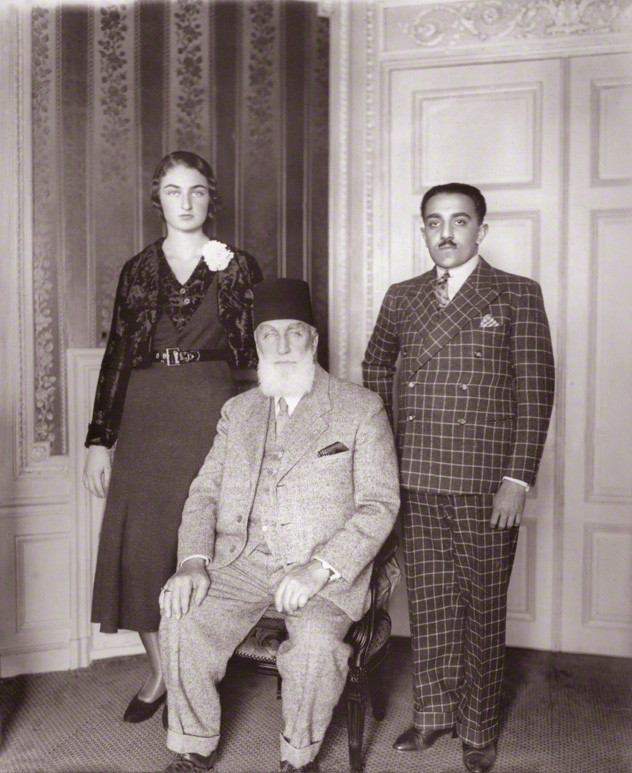
Dürrüşehvar with her father and husband, 1931

Following the festivities in Nice, the princesses and their husbands set sail from Venice on 12 December 1931 to her father-in-law's court in Hyderabad, India. Nilufer and Dürrüşehvar's mothers also accompanied them, with a French midwife. They boarded the ocean liner Pilsna. Mahatma Gandhi had boarded the ship after attending the Second Round Table Conference in London in 1931, and was travelling back to India. It is reported that he met with the princesses. On the way, they were taught how to wear sarees, and the expected etiquette in the presence of the Nizam. After their landing in Bombay, they boarded the private train of the Nizam. After they reached Hyderabad, a banquet was held at the Chowmahalla Palace on 4 January 1932. They then settled down in their respective homes. Dürrüşehvar and Azam Jah settled down in Bella Vista, Hyderabad.

She received the title of Durdana Begum from the Nizam, held the title of Her Highness the Princess of Berar. She was taller than Azam Jah, and the Nizam thought that was a great joke. He regularly used to point out the difference in their height at parties. On 6 October 1933, she gave birth to her elder son, Mukarram Jah, the future Nizam of Hyderabad. He was followed by Muffakham Jah, born on 27 February 1939. She knew of her husband's numerous concubines but carried herself regally. However, the differences between the two eventually led to their marriage falling apart around 1954, and after the divorce, Dürrüşehvar stayed in Hyderabad for some years, then moved to London. She conserved her title of "Princess of Berar". Her mother, who had been by her side in India throughout her marriage, left Hyderabad with Dürrüşehvar.

== Public life ==
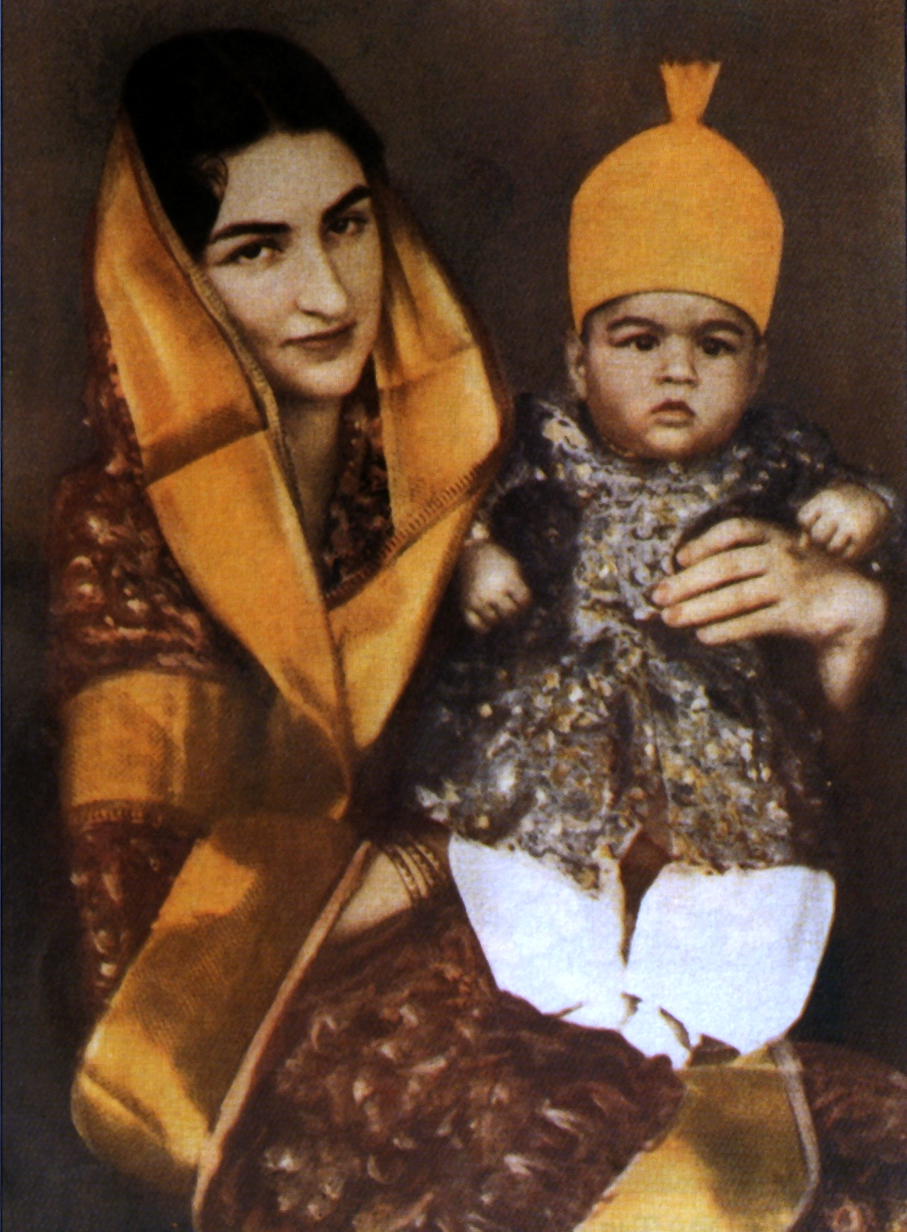
Dürrüşehvar with her son Mukarram Jah, 1934

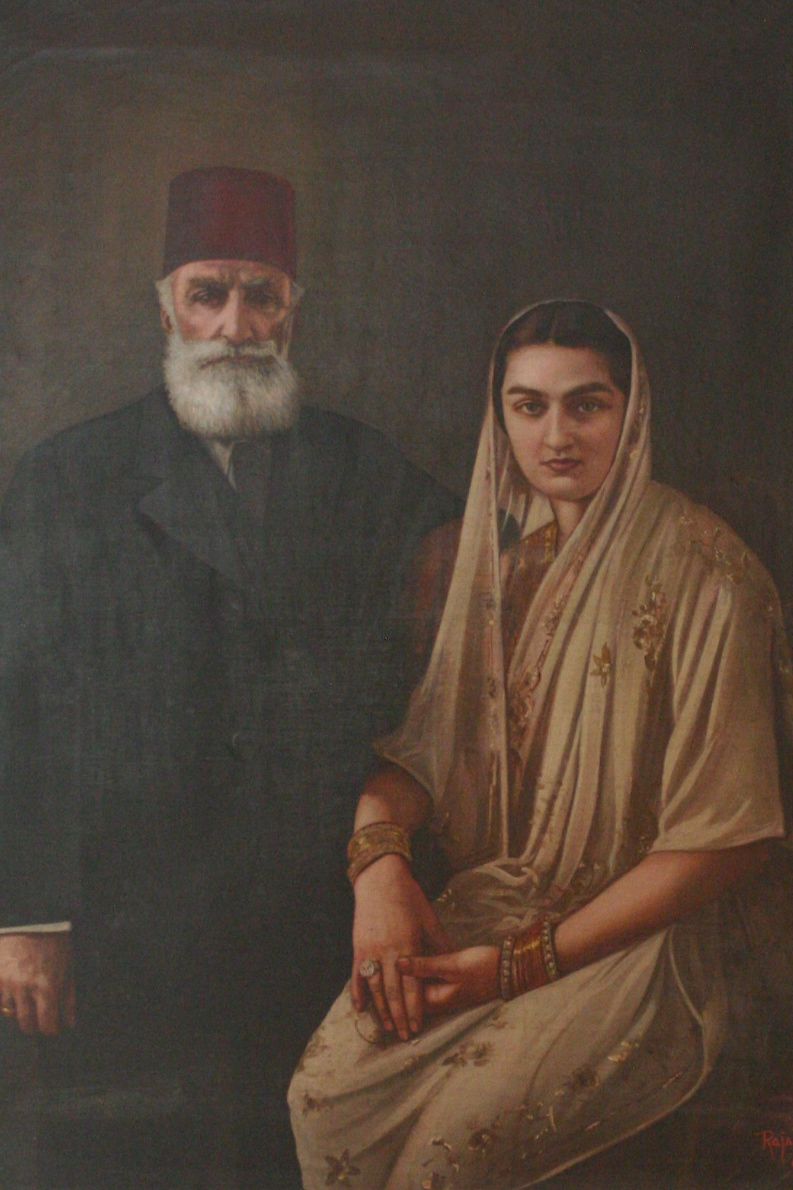
Dürrüşehvar and Abdulmejid II

A highly respected and well-educated lady, the princess was fluent in French, Turkish, English and also Urdu. She was also a painter and a poet. She established a junior college for girls in her name in Yakutpura, Bagh-e-Jahan Ara, Hyderabad, and the Osmania General Hospital. On 4 November 1936, she laid the foundation stone of Hyderabad's Begumpet airport's first terminal, and was presented with a silver casket. She also inaugurated the famous Ajmal Khan Tibbiya College Hospital at Aligarh Muslim University, Aligarh in 1939.

Together with her cousin Niloufer, Dürrüşehvar advocated girls' education and women's rights. They were given free rein, as the Nizam adored both his daughters-in-law, whom he often introduced as the "jewels of his palace". He also encouraged both of them to take part in sports, such as tennis and horse-riding. He sent them on tours of Europe so they could broaden their mind and also pick up works of art for his museums." Both cousins are remembered as great beauties, socialites, style icons, and philanthropists. In the company of her friend Rani Kumudini Devi, she rode horses, drove cars and played tennis. With her beauty and charm, etiquette and dress sense, she transformed Hyderabad’s social circuit.

On 6 May 1935, she and her husband attended the twenty-fifth commemorating ceremony of King George V's reign. On 12 May 1937, they attended the coronation of King George VI and Queen Elizabeth, where she was photographed by British photographer Cecil Beaton. On 23 June 1937, she accompanied her husband during the visit to lay the foundation stone of a new mosque in Kensington and was at Ranelagh to see Bhopal win the Ranelagh Open Polo Cup. Beaton photographed her in her palace in India in 1944, and then in 1965 in France. Philip Mason, of the Indian Civil Service, described her as "a commanding figure, handsome of feature, with a clear fair complexion and auburn hair… No one could ignore her or slight her. She was always essentially and indefinably royal, and it seems to me that if fate had so willed she might have been one of the great queens of the world."

== Later life and death ==
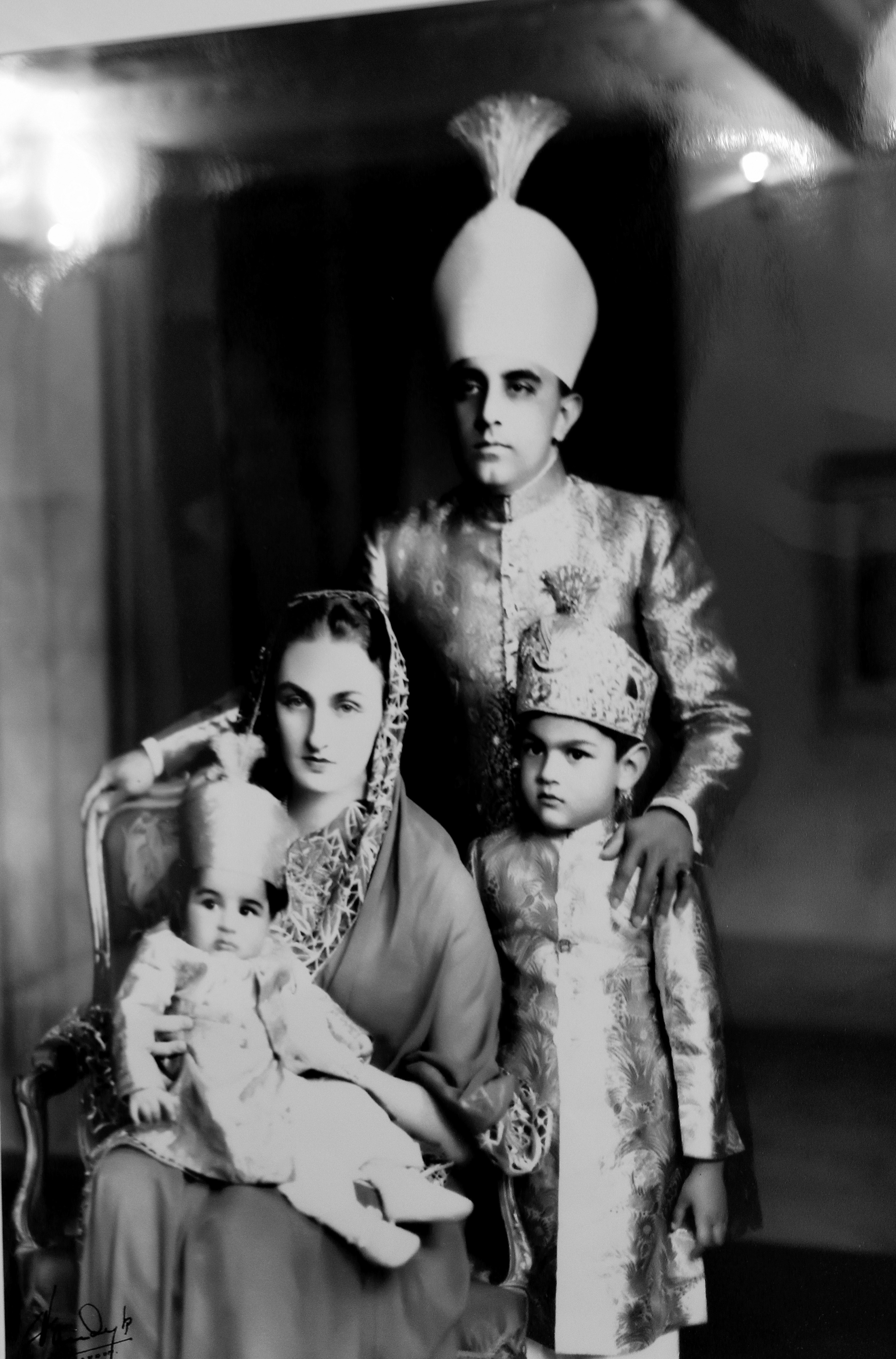
Dürrüşehvar with her husband and sons

She ensured her sons, Prince Mukarram Jah and Prince Muffakam Jah, received the best possible western education in Europe and married Turkish brides, as she desired. Mukarram studied in Eton. Years later, he was declared heir to Hyderabad throne, at the suggestion of his grandfather, and served as honorary aide-de-camp to Prime Minister Jawaharlal Nehru. Each time she returned to Hyderabad for a visit, she attracted big crowds.

In 1944, she called Nilüfer, requesting help for the burial of her father. She had made several efforts to have her father's body buried in Istanbul, but could not obtain the permission of the Turkish government. He had wanted to be buried in either Turkey or Hyderabad. Nilüfer called one of her friends, Malik Ghulam Muhammad, a former official in the Nizam's Government, who was at that time the Governor-General of Pakistan. He called Saud bin Abdulaziz Al Saud, the then King of Saudi Arabia to relay the request. The King agreed to grant the request, and Dürrüşehvar's father was finally buried in Saudi Arabia in the Al-Baqi'.

In 1983, she sponsored the Durru Shehvar Children's & General Hospital in Hyderabad under the patronage of her son Mukarram Jah. In 1990, she, her son Mufakkham Jah and his wife Esin attended the Durban Dinner, along with the Indian and Pakistani High Commissioners in London to commemorate the 400th year of the foundation of Hyderabad.

She last visited Hyderabad in 2004, and died on 7 February 2006 in London. Her two sons were by her side at the time of her death. She was buried in Brookwood Cemetery. She was upset about Turkish Government's attitude towards her family members after declaration of the republic. Despite being a member of Ottoman imperial and royal family, she refused to be buried in Turkey, since she was upset that the Turkish Government refused her father's burial in Istanbul in 1944.

At her death, the Daily Telegraph newspaper wrote: "There was an occasion when she was lunching with a friend in Oxfordshire, at which Princess Margaret was also a guest. The weather was inclement, and both Princesses were invited to plant cedars of Lebanon. Princess Margaret eventually did so - reluctantly - while the Princess of Berar performed her duty with her customary quiet dignity. Today Princess Margaret’s tree struggles, while the Princess of Berar’s thrives".

== Legacy ==
She is remembered for teaching the 'power of silence', and establishing several maternity units, schools, colleges, dispensaries and Durru Shehvar Children's & General Hospital in Hyderabad.

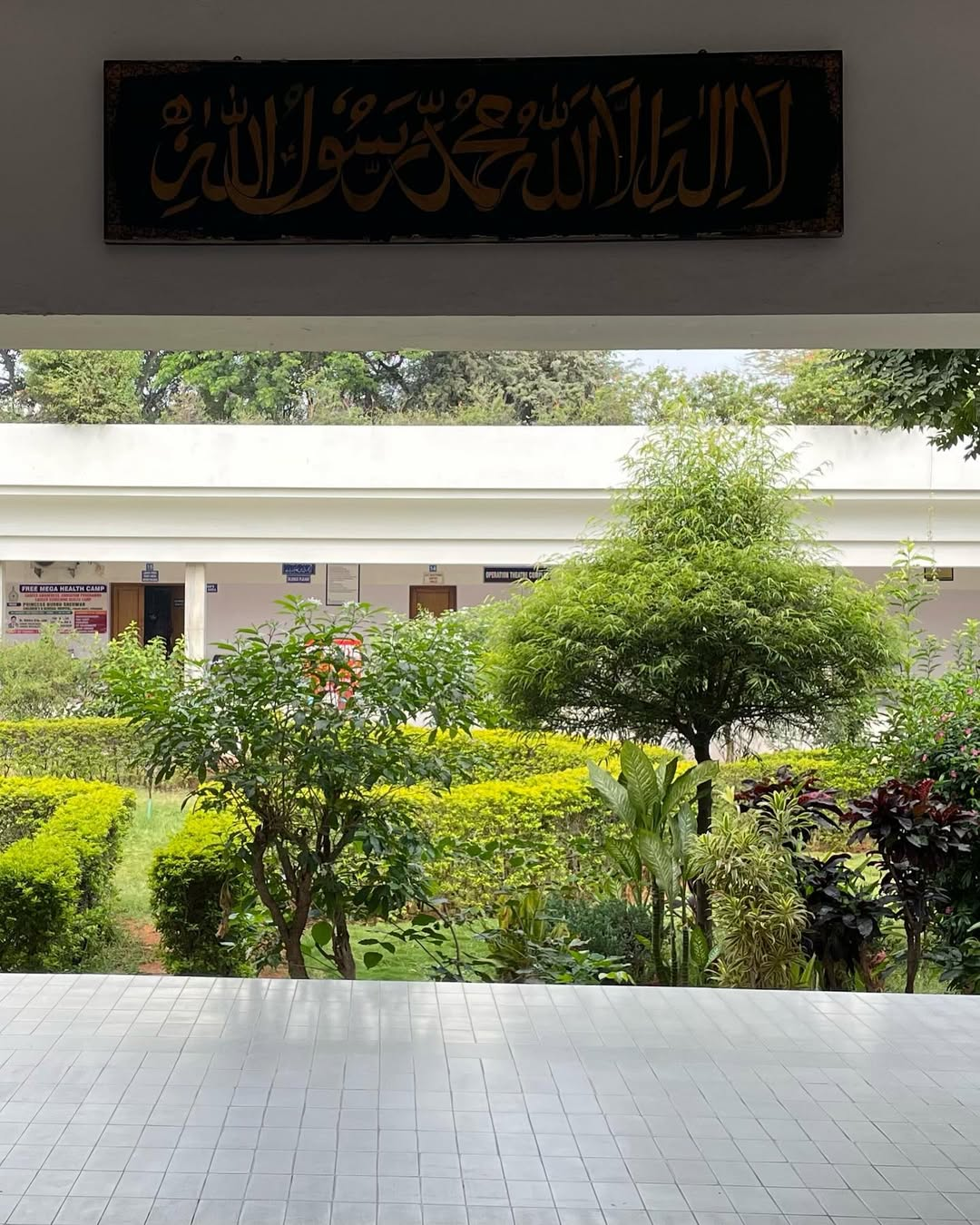
Princess Durru Shehvar Children's and General Hospital

== Honour ==
- Order of the House of Osman

== Issue ==
Name	Birth	Death	Notes
Mukarram Jah	6 October 1933	15 January 2023	Married five times, and had issue, three sons and three daughters
Muffakham Jah	27 February 1939	living	Married once, and had issue, two sons

== Sources ==
- Bardakçı, Murat (2017). Neslişah: The Last Ottoman Princess. Oxford University Press. ISBN 978-9-774-16837-6.
