= International Breast Milk Project =

- Founded: 2006
- Founder: Jill Youse, Founder and Educational Director
- Purpose: Greater Minnesota
- Location: Rochester, Minnesota
- Region served: Africa
- Key people: Laura Wylie, Board Chair
- Website: www.breastmilkproject.org No longer active

The International Breast Milk Project is a non-profit organization that solicits donations of human milk and provides the milk to needy infants.

== History ==
In April 2006 founder Jill Youse searched for ways to donate breast milk and stumbled across an orphanage in Durban, South Africa, looking for donor milk to provide for their HIV positive infants. Soon after she was featured in a local newspaper, and other mothers began contacting her to find ways to donate their milk. As more mothers became involved, more articles were produced which lead to Oprah Winfrey and others. After the wide exposure provided by Oprah and Charles Gibson at ABC World News, IBMP partnered with Prolacta Bioscience, who packaged the donated milk, and Quick International Courier, who transports and ships the milk to Africa. IBMP has provided over a half million ounces of breast milk, and granted $140,000 towards health care in Africa.

One of the top goals of IBMP is to provide donor milk to malnourished, orphaned, or diseased infants in South Africa. Of the half a million ounces of donor milk provided by IBMP donors, 162,665 has gone to infants in need in Africa. IBMP partners with Milk Banks in Africa, where local donors are few, to provide milk to infants.

In addition to providing donor milk, IBMP has granted over $173,000 for health care in Africa, including creating and sustaining milk banks. Along with providing donor milk, it is important to provide sustainable milk bank to store donations.

== Partners ==
Along with working with Prolacta Bioscience to ensure the safety and quality of the donated milk, IBMP received the highest Charities Review Council Review indication that it meets all of the council's Accountability Standards. IBMP is also listed on the online Giving Guide of Smart Giver's Network. Transportation of the donor milk is provided by Quick International. Social Venture Partners is also a supporter of IBMP.
