= Bella Vista, Hyderabad =

Royal palace of the Nizam of Hyderabad

Coordinates: 17.414122°N 78.459633°E

Bella Vista
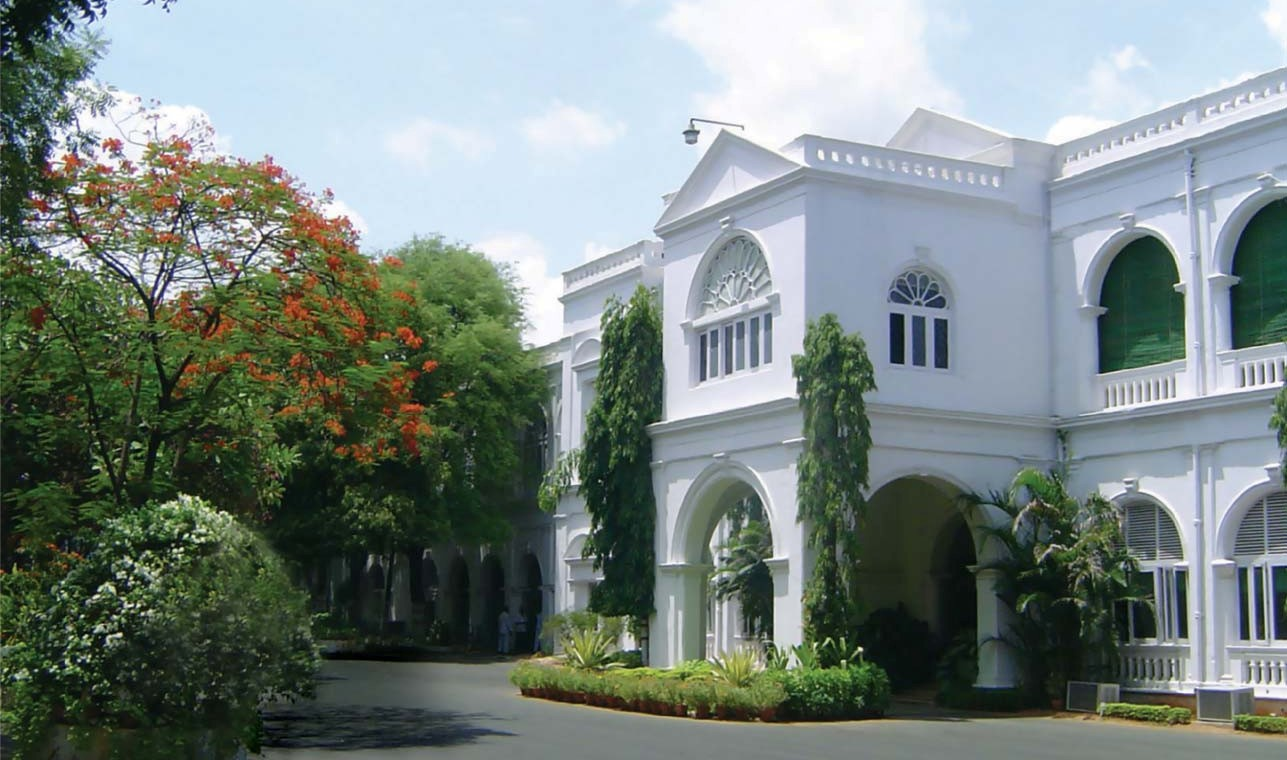
- Interactive map of the Bella Vista area

General information
- Type: Royal Palace
- Architectural style: French
- Location: Somajiguda , near Raj Bhavan, Hyderabad, Telangana, India.
- Completed: 1910; 116 years ago

Design and construction
- Architect: French Architect

Bella Vista is a royal palace of the Nizam during the existence of Hyderabad State, now located in Hyderabad, Telangana, India. It is an Indo-European building standing on a 10-acre (40,000 m^{2}) verdant campus. The building's French architect named it Bella Vista, meaning beautiful sight, since it overlooks the Hussain sagar lake. It is located in the Saifabad suburb and is modeled on the Henley-on-Thames of England. Since 1956, the building has been home to the Administrative Staff College of India.

== History ==
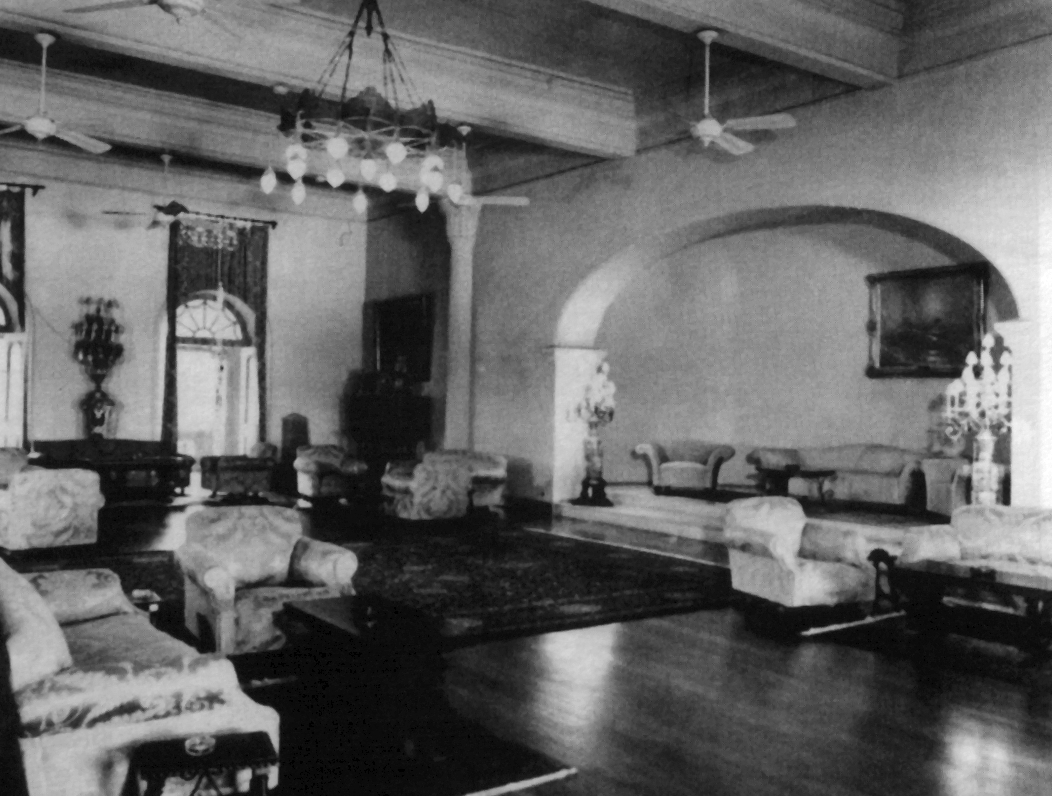
The drawing room of the Bella Vista Palace, prepared for the visit of the Prince of Wales in 1922.

Muslehuddin Mohammed, bar-at-law, became Chief Justice of the High Court of Hyderabad and was given the title Hakim-ud-Dowla. He constructed the palace as his residence in 1905. He lived there from 1905 to 1914 when he fell victim to plague at the age of 57. On his death in 1916, the family decided to sell the palace. The last Nizam purchased it, along with furniture, for Rs 60,000 in 1917.

It was in this palace that the elder son of the Seventh Nizam-Mir Osman Ali Khan who was heir apparent to the throne of Hyderabad - Prince of Berar, Azam Jah lived with his wife, Princess Durru Shehvar.

== Administrative Staff College of India ==
Administrative Staff College of India
- Type: Civil service training institute
- Established: 1956; 70 years ago
- Location: Hyderabad, Telangana, India
- Campus: Urban, 9 acres (0.036 km^{2})
- Website: asci.org.in/
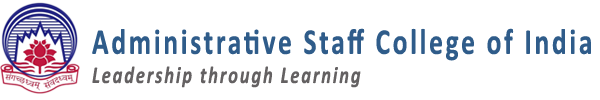

ASCI was started jointly by the Government of India and representatives of industry as an autonomous institute in 1956 for training in the field of civil service development. Initially, the government Of India planned to set up the college in Britain. The first session was to commence in 1948 at Henley. However, a committee of the All India Council for Technical Education in 1953 recommended that the Administrative Staff College be established in India. ASCI specialises in providing non-degree post-graduate diplomas for civil servants of corporate and government sectors and urban management. The research and consultancy activities of ASCI were started in 1973 with aid from Ford Foundation. IAS officer R. H. Khwaja took charge as ASCI director-general on 1 January 2017.
