= Prince of Berar =

Heir apparent to the Nizam of Hyderabad

- پرنس آف بیرار
- Flag of the Hyderabad
- Incumbent; Murad Jah since 14 January 2023
- Style: His Highness
- Member of: House of Asaf Jah
- Appointer: Nizam of Hyderabad
- Term length: Life tenure or until accession as Nizam or the Nizam rescinds the title to grant it to another male-line relative.
- Formation: 27 October 1936
- First holder: Azam Jah

The Prince of Berar (Urdu: پرنس آف بیرار) is the title given to the heir apparent or heir presumptive of the Nizam of Hyderabad. The wife of the Prince is called the Princess of Berar.

== History ==
In 1853, the East India Company signed a treaty with the Nizam of Hyderabad by which the British were required to maintain for the Nizam an auxiliary force of not less than 5,000 infantry, 2,000 cavalry and four field batteries of artillery, and to provide for the payment of this force the Nizam assigned in trust certain districts, including some in Berar, which were estimated to yield a gross revenue of Rs. 5,000,000. In 1860, this treaty was revised by the Government of India and the Hyderabad State, and under the new terms, a portion of Berar was restored to the Nizam, and all outstanding capital debt due by him was remitted. In 1902, this treaty was again revised, and Berar was ceded in perpetuity to the British by the Nizam in return for an annual payment of Rs. 2,500,000. As a mark of his sovereignty over Berar, the Nizam was allowed to fly his flag there and to have a salute fired annually on his birthday.

During his reign, Mir Osman Ali Khan asked the British to restore Berar to him. After much difficulty, the Government concluded another agreement with the Nizam, by which his sovereignty over Berar was recognised and it was to be administered together with the Central Provinces under the Government of India Act 1935. The Nizam was to be styled as the Nizam of Hyderabad and Berar, his flag was to be flown alongside the British flag on all public buildings in Berar on ceremonial occasions, and the Governor of the Central Provinces and Berar was to be appointed in consultation with the Nizam and his heir-apparent, was to be styled as His Highness the Prince of Berar.

On 27 October 1936, Edward VIII sent a letter to the Nizam in which he recognised his sovereignty over Berar and granted the title of His Highness the Prince of Berar to his heir-apparent and his successors. The title was first conferred upon Azam Jah at a special durbar held at the Chowmahalla Palace.

== Style ==
The heir apparent of the Nizam is titled Walashan Nawab (personal title), Sahibzada Mir (personal name) Khan Bahadur, the Prince of Berar, with the style of His Highness; the wife of the heir apparent is titled (personal name) Begum Sahiba, the Princess of Berar, with the style of Her Highness.

== Bearers of the title ==
No	Name	Picture	Birth	Death	Became Prince of Berar	Heir of	Ceased to be Prince of Berar	Spouse	Note(s)
1	Azam Jah		22 February 1907	7 October 1970	27 October 1936	Osman Ali Khan	24 February 1967	Dürrüşehvar Sultan	He continued to hold the title until his death, even though his son, Barkat Ali Khan, had succeeded Osman Ali Khan in his lifetime.
2	Azmet Jah		20 January 2023	living	2002	Barkat Ali Khan	14 January 2023 acceded to throne	Zeynep Naz Guvendiren	
3	Murad Jah		1998	living	14 January 2023	Azmet Jah	Incumbent		

== See also ==
- Asaf Jahi dynasty
- Hyderabad State
- Nizam of Hyderabad
