= Himayatnagar, Hyderabad =

Himayatnagar
- Neighbourhood
- Location in Telangana, India Himayatnagar (Telangana) Himayatnagar (India)
- Coordinates: 17°24′24″N 78°29′00″E
- Country: India
- State: Telangana
- District: Hyderabad
- Metro: Hyderabad

Government
  - Body: GHMC
- Elevation: 494 m (1,621 ft)

Languages
  - Official: Telugu
- Time zone: UTC+5:30 (IST)
- PIN: 500029, 500075
- Vehicle registration: TG
- Lok Sabha constituency: Secunderabad
- Vidhan Sabha constituency: Khairatabad
- Planning agency: GHMC
- Website: telangana.gov.in

Himayatnagar (Hee-mā-yath-na-gar) is a neighbourhood in Hyderabad, Telangana, India. It is also a mandal in Hyderabad District. It was named after Mir Himayat Ali Khan (Azam Jah), the 1st son of the last Nizam of Hyderabad.

== Geography ==
Himayatnagar is located at the south-eastern side of Hussain Sagar. It adjoins the localities of Narayanguda, Basheerbagh and Hyderguda.

== History ==
Himayatnagar developed into the residential and commercial frontier of the city around the mid-1960s.

== Transport ==
TSRTC connects Himayatnagar to all parts of the city.

== Major establishments ==
Himayatnagar has the offices of the Telangana State Tourism Development Corporation and the Telugu Academy. Tirumala Tirupati Devasthanam has an office at Himayatnagar. A noted center, Urdu Hall is located here.

== Institutes ==
- Hamstech Institute of Fashion & Interior Design is located here

== Gallery ==
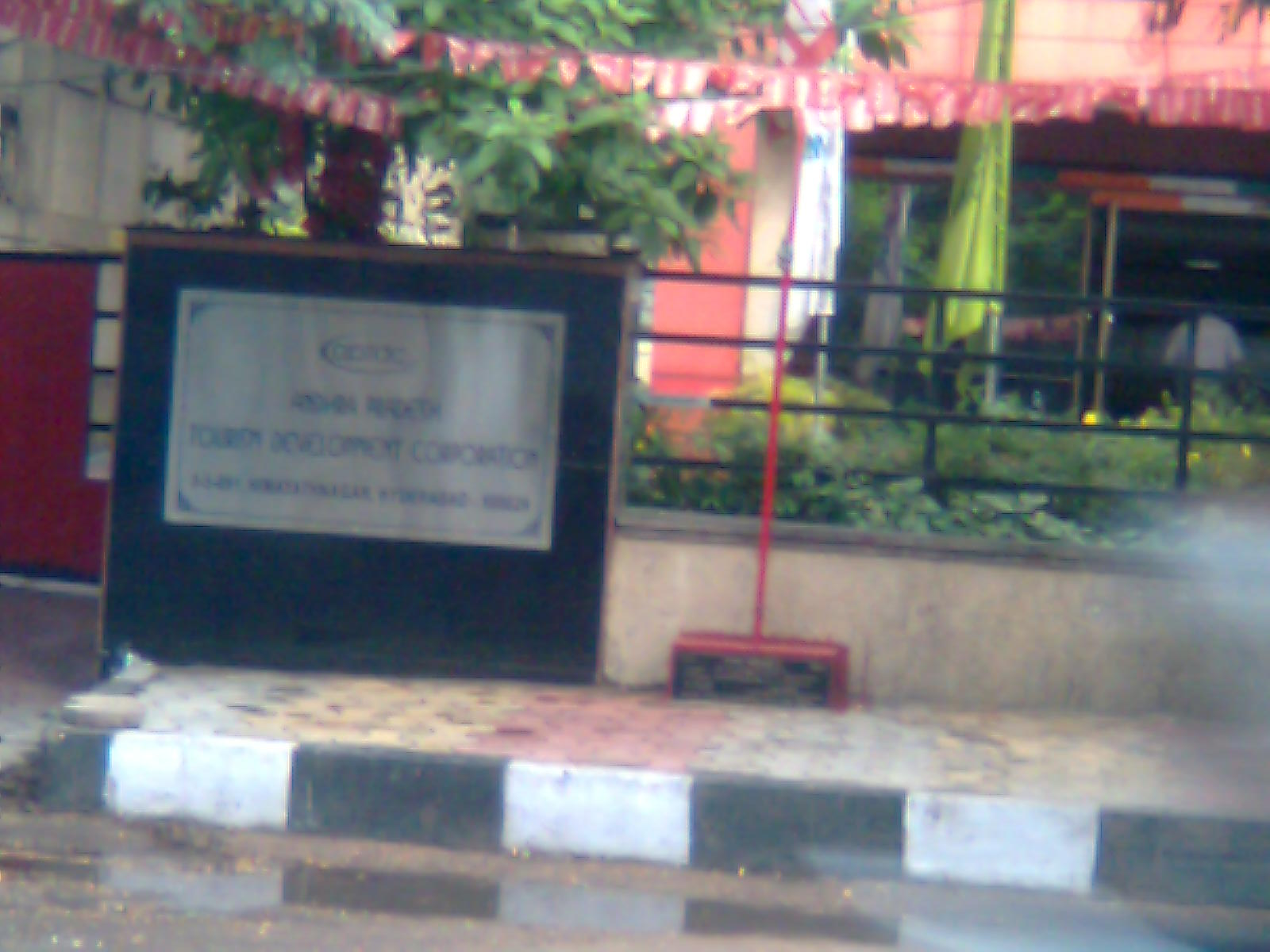
Telangana State Tourism Development Corporation Office in Himayatnagar.

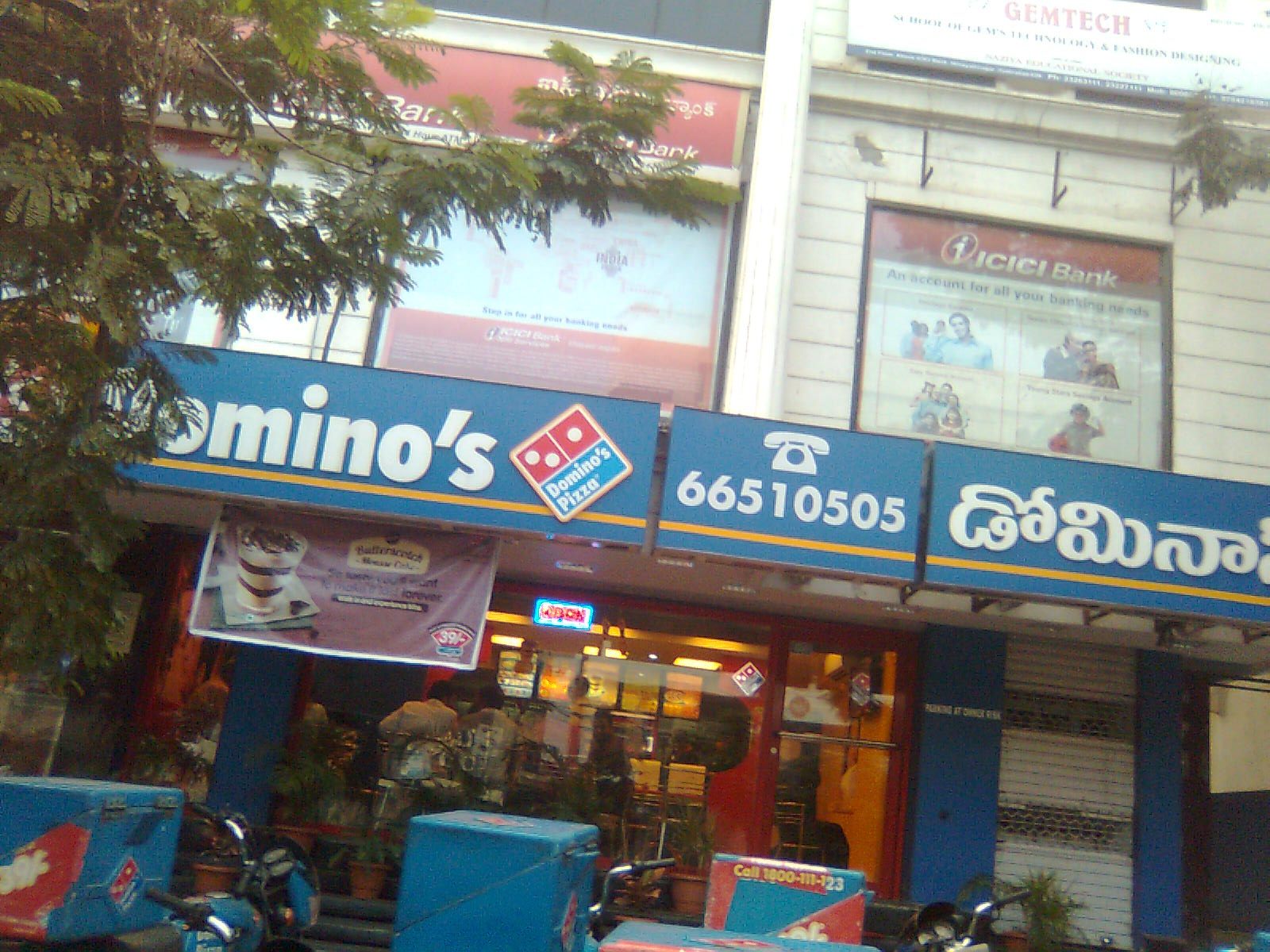
Domino's Pizza outlet in Himayatnagar.
