= Himayatnagar, Ranga Reddy district =

Himayatnagar
- village
- Location in Telangana, India Himayatnagar (Telangana) Himayatnagar (India)
- Coordinates: 17°20′N 78°18′E
- Country: India
- State: Telangana

Languages
  - Official: Telugu
- Time zone: UTC+5:30 (IST)
- Vehicle registration: TS
- Website: telangana.gov.in

Himayatnagar is a village in Moinabad Mandal, Rangareddy District in Telangana state formerly part of Andhra pradesh state, India.

Himayatnagar village has the ashram built by the former chief minister of Andhra pradesh, Nandamuri Taraka Rama Rao. Some large residential schools are coming up in this village adjoining the lake.

Himayatnagar is a couple of kilometers before Chilkur Village (coming from Hyderabad) which is famous for the Chilkur Balaji temple.

This village lies about a kilometer off the Chevella State Highway. Because of its proximity to the Telangana State Police Academy junction it should be of interest for housing in the coming years. However it is governed by a strict conservation law called the GO 111 for protection of the surrounding water reservoirs.
