= Lactation failure =

- Specialty: Family medicine

In breastfeeding, lactation failure may refer to:

- Primary lactation failure, a cause of low milk supply in breastfeeding mothers
- Cessation of breastfeeding before the mother had planned to stop, usually as a result of breastfeeding difficulties
- Low milk supply in general
- Inability to establish breastfeeding, which may be caused by delayed onset of lactation

Lactation failure can result in neonatal jaundice.
