= Elisabeth Anderson Sierra =

Record holder for breast milk donation

Elisabeth Anderson Sierra (born c. 1988) is an American woman who holds the Guinness World Record for the largest individual donation of breast milk.

== Family and life ==
Anderson Sierra is a resident of Aloha, Oregon. She is married to David Sierra, and together they have two daughters and a son. She has a medical condition called hyperlactation syndrome characterized by excessive breast milk production, which leads to milk overflow. Anderson Sierra has been actively involved in donating breast milk to both local families and recipients worldwide. As of July 2023, her estimated total donation of breast milk amounts to over 350,000 U.S. fluid ounces (10,000 liters). She has received multiple nicknames, including "the milk goddess", "super producer", and "pumping queen."

== Hyperlactation syndrome ==
In 2014, Sierra was diagnosed with hyperlactation syndrome, a medical condition characterized by an excessive production of breast milk. Approximately midway through her initial pregnancy, she found herself producing a substantial amount of breast milk, approximately 20 U.S. fluid ounces (0.59 liters) per day. During her prenatal appointments, she communicated her milk volume in ounces while her midwife and doctor mistakenly understood it to be in milliliters. In truth, she was producing far more milk than the 45 milliliters considered normal during pregnancy.

As a result of this syndrome, Sierra produces approximately 225 US fluid ounces (6.7 L) of breast milk per day, which is nearly 8 to 10 times the amount produced by an average mother. Not wanting this surplus to go to waste, she donates her extra breast milk.

Sierra has been collaborating with a breast pump company to make breastfeeding easier for nursing moms. She works as a certified lactation counselor and as the director of lactation services at a breast pump company named BabyBuddha.

== Record ==
Milk sharing is the act of donating breast milk, either packaged or by directly breastfeeding a recipient's infant. This can supplement or replace infant formula or the infant's mother's milk if either is unavailable or unsuitable.

In 2023, Sierra achieved the world record for the largest individual breast milk donation by donating 54,092 U.S. fluid ounces (1,599.68 liters) to a human milk bank during the period from February 20, 2015, to June 20, 2018. She has donated more than 350,000 U.S. fluid ounces (10,350 liters) of breast milk to local families and recipients globally since 2014.

Sierra said that she hopes to surpass her current record and hopes that by disseminating her personal narrative, the act of sharing milk will become normalized.

== See also ==
- Rumina
