= Delayed onset of lactation =

Breast milk production delay

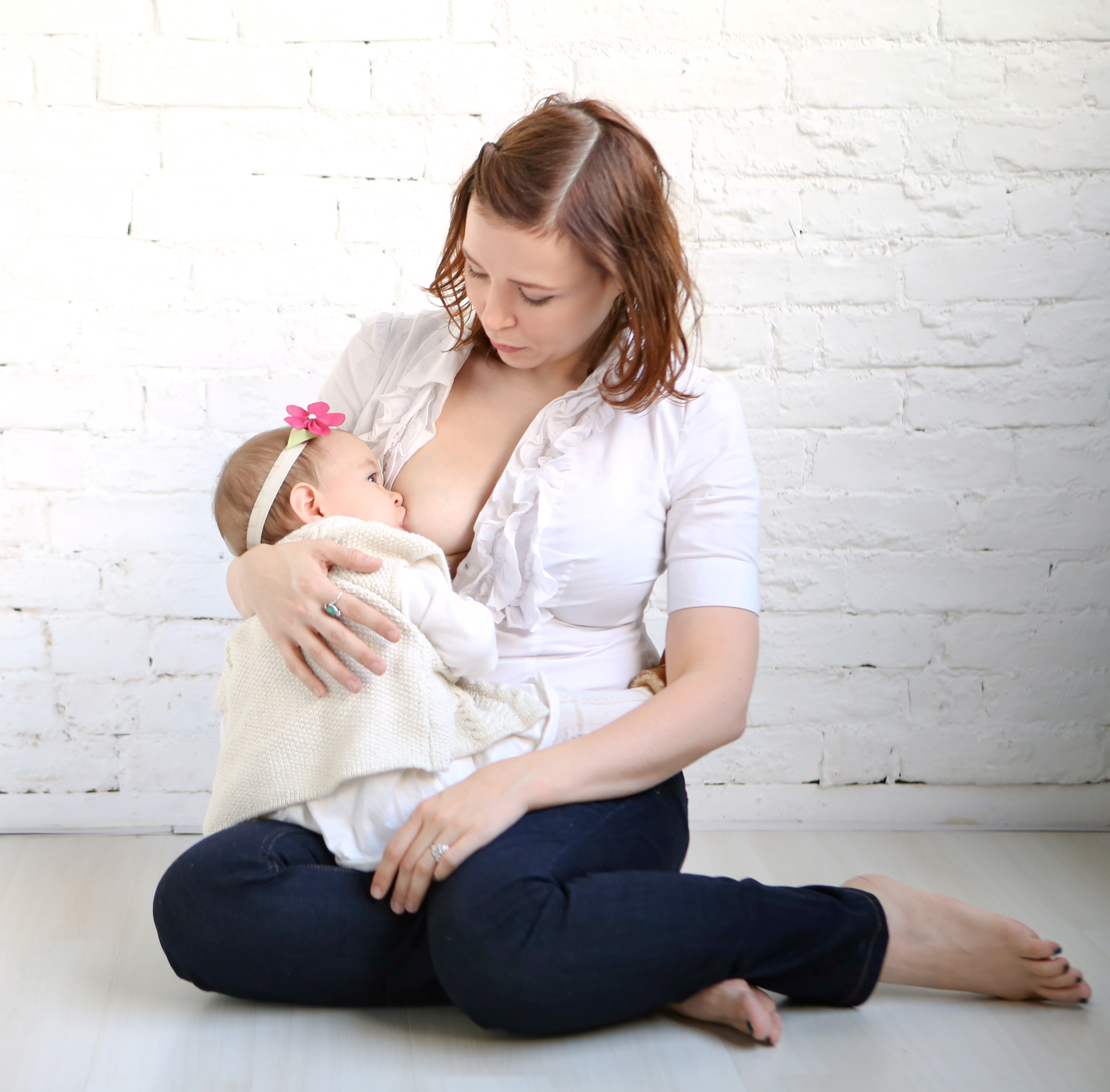
Breastfeeding an infant

Delayed onset of lactation (DOL) describes the absence of copious milk secretion (onset of lactation) within the first 72 hours following childbirth. It affects around 20–40% of lactating women, the prevalence differs among distinct populations.

The onset of lactation (OL), also referred to as stage II lactogenesis or secretory activation, is one of the three stages of the milk production process. OL is the stage when plentiful production of milk is initiated following the delivery of a full-term infant. It is stimulated by an abrupt withdrawal of progesterone and elevation of prolactin levels after the complete expulsion of placenta. The other two stages of milk production are stage I lactogenesis and stage III lactogenesis. Stage I lactogenesis refers to the initiation of the mammary glands' synthetic capacity, indicated by the onset of colostrum production that takes place during pregnancy. Stage III lactogenesis refers to the continuous supply of mature milk from day nine postpartum, until weaning.

Late-onset of lactogenesis II can be provoked by a variety of pathophysiological, psychological, external and mixed causes. The delay of the process is associated with a range of complications such as excessive neonatal weight loss and early cessation of breastfeeding, which can lead to undesirable outcomes for the infant and the mother. These problems can be addressed by different interventions targeting the underlying cause of the delay.

== Diagnosis ==
Chemical structure of progesterone, a key hormone in the onset of lactation

Women who experienced delayed OL reports the absence of typical onset signs, including breast swelling, breast heaviness and sense of breast milk "coming in" within the first 72 hours postpartum; nevertheless, some reports suggest that the sensation of "milk coming in (to the breasts)" is resultant of milk production overshoot instead.

Clinically, obstetricians may look for biomarkers to determine the onset of lactation. Some common biomarkers for the determination of secretory activation include:

- A drop in progesterone levels
- Increase in blood flow, oxygen and glucose uptake
- A sharp increase in citrate and lactose concentration
- Plasma α-lactalbumin levels peak and
- Decreased breast milk sodium concentration

Note that delayed onset of lactogenesis II is distinct from low milk supply, where there is a normal onset of lactation, but breast milk is produced in small and insufficient amounts.

== Causes and risk factors ==
Delayed onset of lactation can be a result of various factors including pathophysiological, psychological, external, and mixed factors.

Summary table: Factors associated with DOL
Factors	Causes
Pathophysiological	Retainment of placental fragments; Maternal obesity
Psychological	Stressful labor and delivery
External	Ineffective breastfeeding practices; Labor pain medications
Mixed	Primiparity

=== Pathophysiological ===
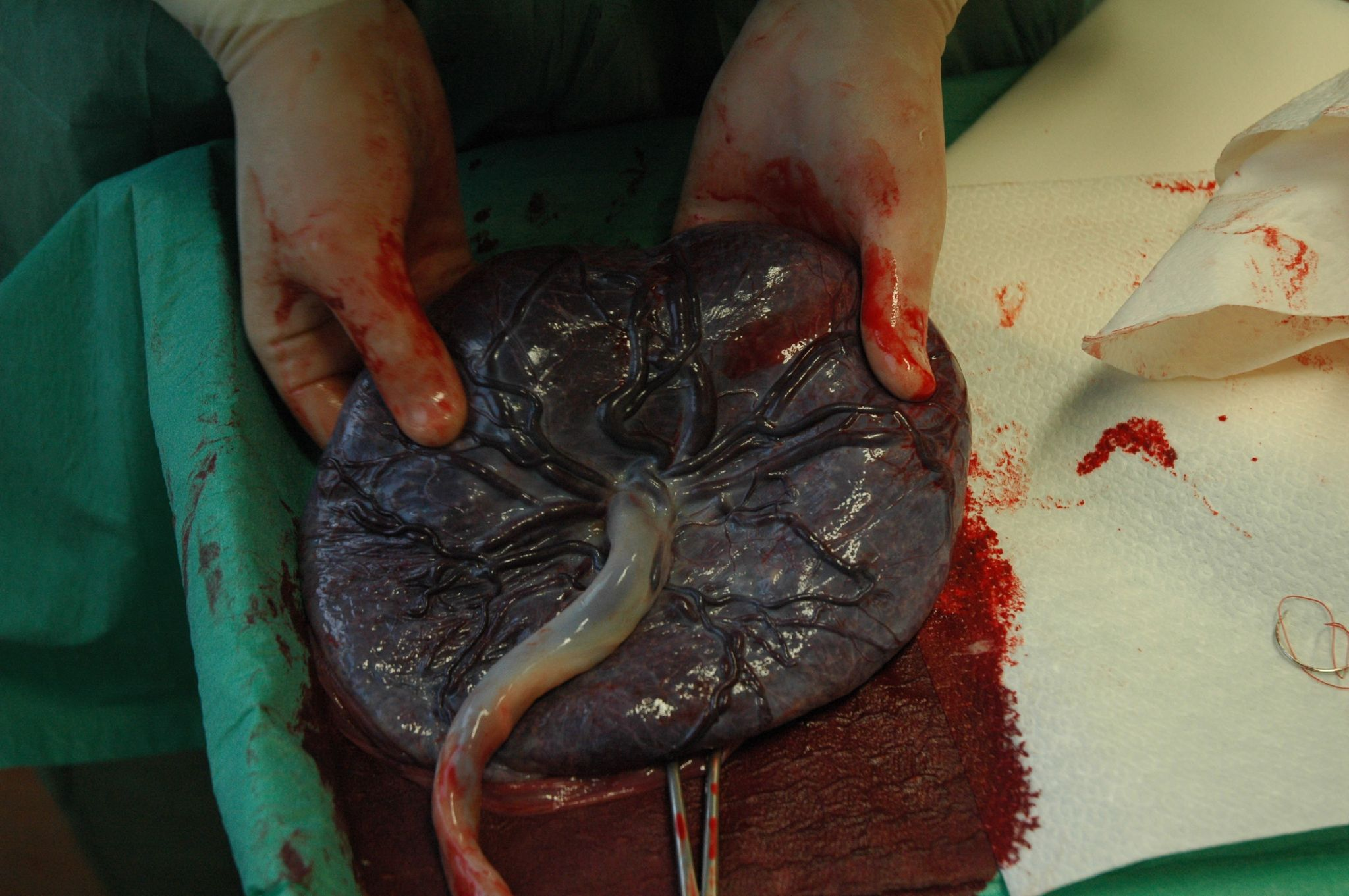
Photograph of a placenta expelled after labor. Failure of complete expulsion of placenta can hinder the onset of lactation.

==== Retainment of placental fragments ====
Retained placenta fragments is an outcome of failure in the complete expulsion of the placenta, and contributes to DOL. Residual portions of the placenta continue to secrete progesterone, which inhibits progesterone withdrawal and subsequently hinders the initiation of lactogenesis II.

The successful onset of lactation following clearance of placenta fragments has been reported in multiple case studies. The dilation and curettage (D&C) procedure has been reported with dramatic therapeutic effects for mothers experiencing delayed OL due to placenta retainment.

==== Maternal obesity ====
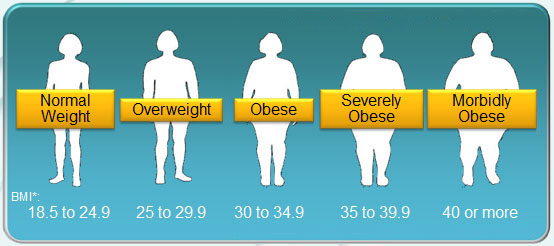
A chart showing BMI classification for obesity and overweight. Overweight or obese mothers have a higher risk of experiencing DOL.

Obesity has been reported as a risk factor that has significant associations with DOL, although different studies have shown varied conclusions on such connection. Relevant reports reveal around one-third of overweight and obese women encountered late arrival of milk, in comparison to approximately one-sixth among women with normal body mass index (BMI).

One theory behind delayed copious milk production is that progesterone stored in adipose tissue has led to elevated progesterone levels among obese or overweight women. This interferes with progesterone withdrawal upon the delivery of the placenta and consequently disrupts the activation mechanism of lactogenesis II.

Another theory affiliates delayed lactogenesis II with large breasts, which is typically observed in obese females. Women with large breasts may encounter physical difficulties with latching the infant onto the breast, while the positioning of heavy breasts on an infant's chest may also hamper successful attachment. Unsuccessful attachment may lead to poor infant suckling, which can impede neurohormonal responses and subsequently interrupt the secretion of lactogenic hormones, resulting in delayed secretory activation.

=== Psychological ===
==== Stressful labor and delivery ====
Maternal stress experienced during labor and delivery can induce DOL. Stress levels can be influenced by factors including the way of labor, duration of labor and degree of post-surgical pain after a cesarean surgery (c-section). Unscheduled cesarean delivery and long labor duration place excessive pressure on the mother and the fetus. In these cases, high perceived pressure raises cortisol levels inside the body. The elevated level of the stress hormone affects the secretion of lactogenic hormones in the mother, which delays the onset of lactation.

Women who underwent a c-section are more likely to experience DOL compared to women who delivered vaginally. This affiliation could be the result of post-surgical pain and stress associated with emergency c-section or prolonged labor. Similarly, a significantly larger proportion of mothers who gave birth by emergency c-section were reported to be unsuccessful on their first attempt at breastfeeding than women who delivered vaginally, or via scheduled c-section.

Maternal stress can also be induced by a protracted separation between mother and infant upon cesarean birth under hospital policies, where the infant has to be transferred to transitional care nursery, or admitted into the neonatal department due to minor illnesses. In both scenarios, the extended period of separation is a significant problem to the initiation of breastfeeding.

=== External ===
==== Ineffective breastfeeding practices ====
Suboptimal breastfeeding practices of mothers and fetuses also influence the onset of lactation. In particular, exclusive formula-feeding and poor quality of breastfeeding can account for DOL. Mothers whose baby is completely formula-fed from birth may not receive adequate neurohormonal stimulus required for the timely onset of lactation, given that frequent infant suckling is shown to have a stimulatory effect on secretory activation. Meanwhile, breastfeeding quality within the first 48 hours of birth, indicated by signs of successful lactation such as nipple discomfort, is inversely correlated with DOL. This association can be attributed to insufficient nipple stimulation and breast emptying for stimulating lactogenesis II, as a result of low breastfeeding quality.

==== Labor pain medications ====
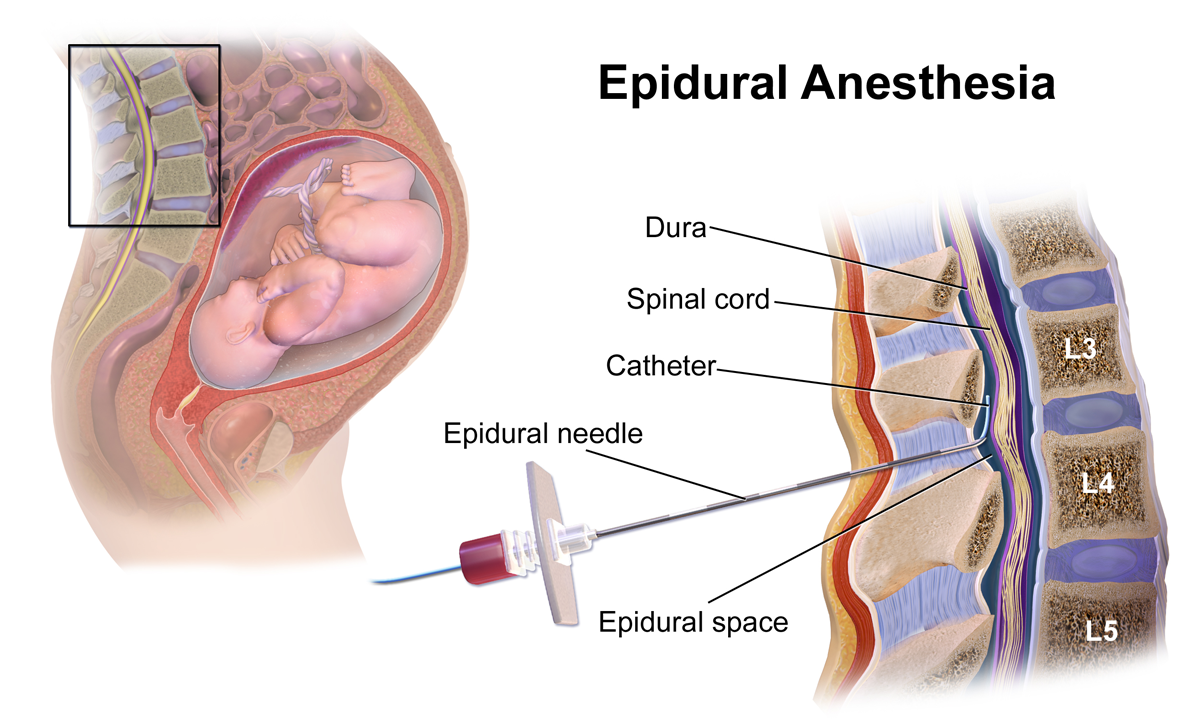
Administration of epidural anesthesia, a common procedure to alleviate pain during labor

Receiving pain-relieving medications during labor increases the chance of mothers experiencing DOL by around 2–3 times, compared to women without medications, with a higher incidence of delayed OL among the mothers who underwent unexpected cesarean section. Although the link between the medications and DOL is yet to be proven, there are two proposed mechanisms on how the administration of such medications can lead to late-onset. One is that most of the analgesic medications are lipid-soluble, implying that drug molecules can potentially reach the fetus by passing through the placenta or via the umbilical cord. This might exert a sedative and depressive effect on the fetus, which can lead to suboptimal breastfeeding behaviors. For instance, diminished suckling and reduced ability to latch onto the breast effectively, by which the initiation of breastfeeding could be impeded. An alternative explanation is that the administration of epidural anesthesia is associated with lower plasma oxytocin levels in mothers, hence reducing milk ejection reflex.

=== Mixed ===
==== Primiparity ====
Primiparity, or first-time bearing a child, is among the most evident risk factors for the delayed onset. It is observed that the prevalence of the condition among primiparae is significantly higher than that among multiparae. Although the full mechanism behind this association is not clear, it can be partly attributed to inadequate breastfeeding experience or physiological knowledge on normal lactation, as well as long duration of labor. Primiparity is a risk factor for prolonged labor, which is affiliated with worse labor pain and prolonged second stage of labor, both of which may lead to increased maternal stress resulting in a delayed onset.

== Associated consequences ==
The delayed onset of lactation may leave unfavorable outcomes for the mothers and infants like suboptimal infant breastfeeding, behavior excessive neonatal weight loss and shortened duration of breastfeeding.

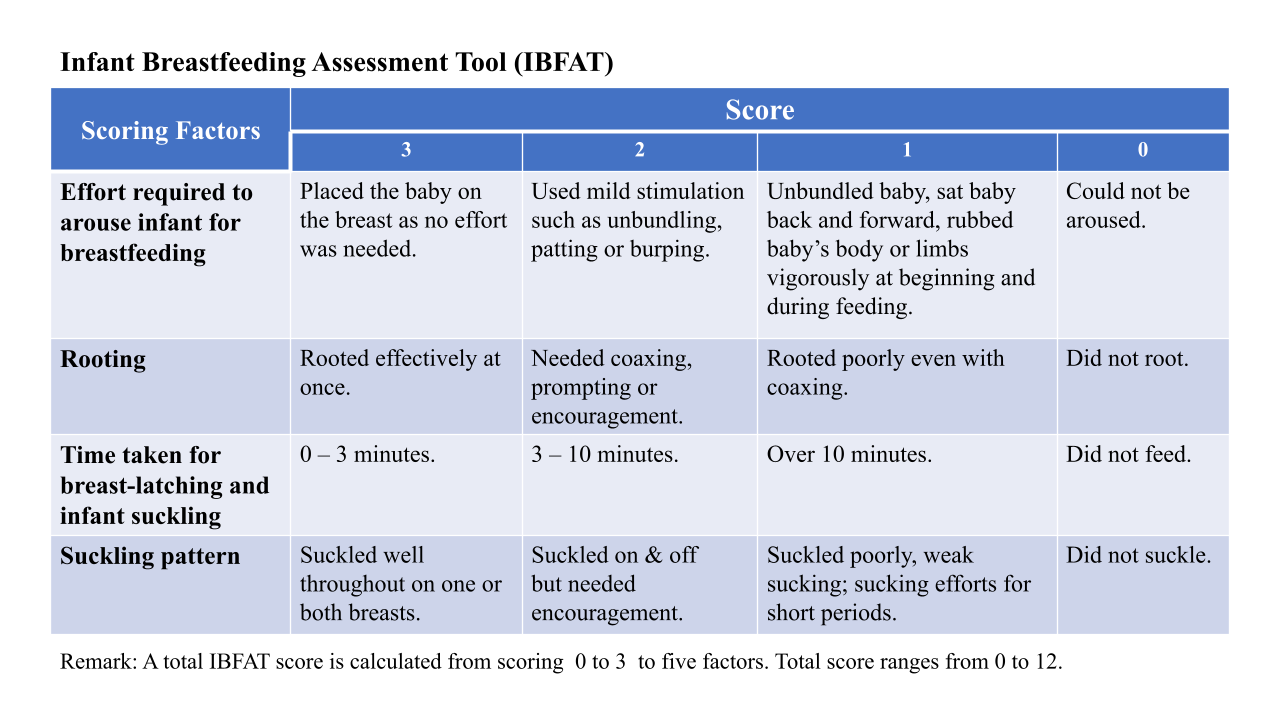
Infant Breastfeeding Assessment Tool (IBFAT) is used for the assessment of breastfeeding quality.

=== Suboptimal Infant Breastfeeding Behavior (SIBB) ===
Studies observed that SIBB is prevalent among infants with mothers experiencing delayed copious milk production. In most of these studies, SIBB is indicated with a low Infant Breastfeeding Assessment Tool (IBFAT) score. This indicates a correlation between DOL with low milk consumption, which can be a cause for inadequate nutritional intake by the infant in the long term, and result in suboptimal growth and development.

=== Excessive neonatal weight loss ===
Infant weight loss greater than 10% of initial birth weight during the first 72 hours of life is observed in infants with mothers experiencing DOL. Although neonatal weight loss is a normal physiological process where the infant excretes extra extracellular fluids accumulated pre-birth, it typically should not exceed 10% of birth weight. With delayed OL, excessive weight loss is likely to be an indication and result of ineffective milk transfer, which can subsequently lead to reduced breast milk production due to Feedback Inhibition of Lactation (FIL).

=== Shortened period of breastfeeding ===
Delayed lactogenesis II is associated with earlier cessation of breastfeeding, and lowered mother confidence in breastmilk production. This eventually leads to earlier formula-transitioning. Even though nutrition obtained from formula milk is comparable and sufficient for the normal physical growth of an infant, maternal milk remains the best source of infant nutrition. It has been recommended by the World Health Organization to opt for exclusive breastfeeding until after six months post-delivery, in order to achieve optimal infant health. One of the rationales of this suggestion is that formula-milk does not fully support the normal trajectory of fat tissue development, as reflected in the altered body-composition development in formula-fed infants compared to breastfed infants. Formula-feeding is also linked to poor health outcomes in less developed countries, with higher mortality from diarrhea and pneumonia in formula-fed than breastfed babies due to the prevalence of unsanitary preparation, equipment and lack of clean water.

== Management ==
When DOL is suspected, intervention should be cause-driven, with a common purpose to improve lactation performance. The strategies include lactation consultation, regular removal of milk from breasts, nipple stimulation or surgical procedures to remove the retained placenta.

=== Lactation consultation ===
Mothers experiencing breastfeeding difficulties are often being referred to the lactation consultants attached to the maternity unit or a child-and-family health center. Lactation consultants provide breastfeeding assistance, training and advice for the mother-infant pairs facing challenges during breastfeeding.

For instance, the consultants provide suck training. It is a special technique aiming to help infants with difficulties in coordinating with the undulation of the tongue to learn proper muscle coordination in breastfeeding. In addition, these trained experts can intervene by supporting mothers in establishing long-term breastfeeding goals, as well as by giving practical assistance in breastfeeding. It is also observed that obese women and women undergoing emergency cesareans are likely not to breastfeed owing to the fear of DOL or breastfeeding failure. In such cases, effective and sustained breastfeeding can be initiated under a supportive environment, which can be achieved through providing emotional sessions and informing them about the minimal amounts of colostrum secreted on day one postpartum, to increase their confidence in breastfeeding.

=== Regular removal of milk and nipple stimulation ===
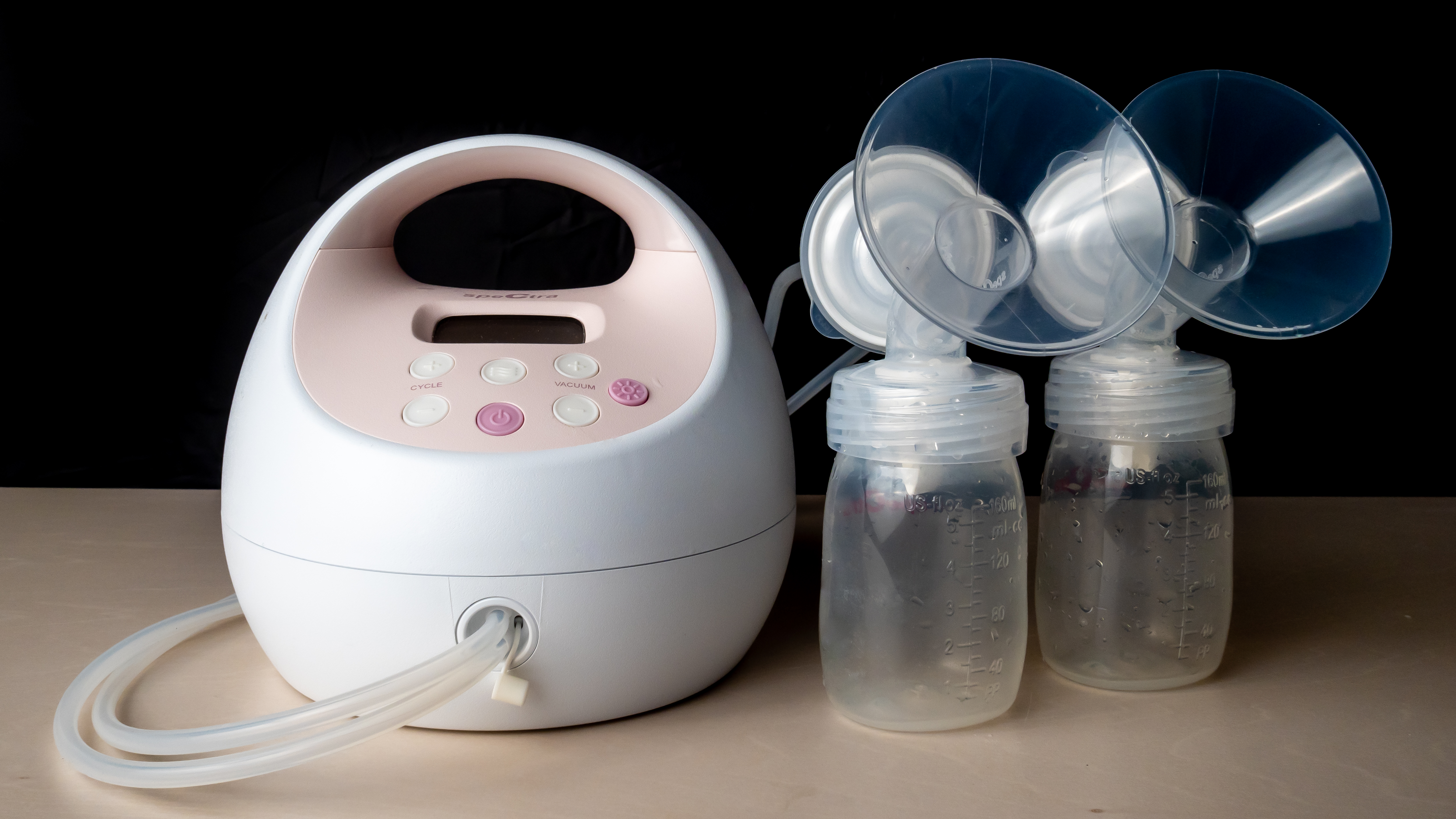
Breast emptying using breast pumps can increase the chance of successful establishment of lactogenesis.

Dilation and curettage is performed to remove the firmly attached placental fragments, in order to restore a declination in progesterone level to initiate lactation.

Lactation is maintained by routine deposition of milk and nipple stimulation, which triggers prolactin and oxytocin release from the pituitary glands. Women are encouraged to remove the milk from their breasts every two to three hours to maintain a steady milk supply.

Effective ways of emptying the breasts involve breast pumping with a hospital-grade breast pump, for the pumping action promotes complete breast emptying and breast stimulation. This emptying process has to begin at around day three postpartum to increase the chance of successful establishment of lactogenesis.

Stimulation of the nipple can also be achieved by means of terminating estrogen treatment and supplementation. Estrogen treatment can diminish nipple sensitivity, which leads to decreased prolactin release. Therefore, pausing estrogen treatment can effectively restore nipple tactile-sensitivity to infant suckling, thereby activating the release of lactogenic hormones.

=== Placental fragment removal ===
Removal of placental fragments is needed when the placenta cannot be expelled by natural uterine contraction, this can be illustrated with two scenarios that require different treatment methods.

In situations where fragments have been separated from the uterus but yet to be expelled, manual extraction will be performed by directly pulling the detached placenta by hand to bring it outside of the body. Whereas in cases where placental fragments are firmly attached to the wall of the uterus, dilation and curettage is the definitive and therapeutic method of choice. Once the remaining placenta is removed, the mother will be able to restore the expected decline in progesterone level and initiate the onset of lactation.
