= Overactive let-down =

Overactive let-down (OALD) is the forceful ejection of milk from the breast during breastfeeding. In some women it occurs only with the first let-down in a feeding, occasionally women may have multiple strong letdowns during a feeding. OALD can make breastfeeding difficult and can be the source of some breastfeeding complications. It may also be known as hyper milk-ejection. A woman may have OALD in addition to an oversupply of breastmilk. (Often called foremilk-hindmilk imbalance, hyperlactation syndrome, oversupply colic syndrome, and other near synonyms.) The physical or medical cause of an overactive let-down is still unknown. Whether mothers with OALD have a higher overall milk volume – or a strong reaction to the hormone oxytocin (which causes the let-down reflex) also remains to be seen.

== Complications ==
The forceful spray of milk can cause the baby to consume too much milk too quickly as well as to swallow air during the period of rapid swallowing following the let-down. The speed of the flow of milk into the mouth can cause the baby to react with reduced nursing times and aversion to nursing often described by mothers as "fussiness", "colicky", "dislikes nursing", or "is weaning". Some babies, especially those of approximately 2–4 months of age, become increasingly upset with the spray of milk which may increase their aversion to nursing to the point of refusing the breast (a nursing strike).

Overactive let-down can be a part of a constellation of symptoms that make up oversupply syndrome or oversupply colic. Babies coping with OSS, gain weight quickly in the early months, even while nursing for short period. Some OSS babies sleep for surprisingly long periods of time and depth, possibly due to an over-full feeling, while others have very disturbed sleep, possibly due to gastrointestinal pain.

== Treatment ==
There are effective remedies for overactive let-down, and oversupply syndrome, however aggressive treatment should be watched carefully by someone familiar with the condition as the mother is at a higher risk for plugged ducts, mastitis and other breast infections.

Overactive let-down can take a long time to control and can be frustrating for the mother and baby, but when controlled effectively a long and satisfying breastfeeding relationship is possible. Mothers with this condition are often given various incorrect rationales for their concerns such as "having weak milk", or "bad milk", it's "just colic", the baby will "grow out of it", or the child is "allergic to your milk", or a food in the mother's diet.

There are no valid reasons to stop breastfeeding due to this condition.

A strong letdown reflex often coincides with overactive milk production, engorgement, and problems with the sucking/breathing pattern of the baby.

Remedies for Engorgement include:

- Gentle breast massage from the chest wall toward the nipple area before nursing.
- Cool compresses for up to 20 minutes before nursing.
- Moist warmth for a few minutes before nursing may help the milk begin to flow. Avoid using warmth for more than a few minutes as the warmth can increase swelling and inflammation.
- When preparing to nurse, mothers should allow the initial letdown reflex to occur and then subside before beginning the nursing session. Or they may stop the nursing momentarily until that strong letdown reflex passes. This will allow the milk flow to normalize. For very young infants, it may help to hand express the initial milk flow. It can extend the nursing session which is preferable for young infants.

Remedies for OALD include:

- When nursing, listen carefully to the breathing and sucking pattern of the baby. If the pattern is interrupted and it sounds as if the baby is struggling to swallow, gently slip a finger in the baby's mouth and remove the nipple until the baby is able to swallow and breathe. Also, have a hand towel near during nursing. It can be easily tucked into the bra to absorb the overflow of milk when waiting for that letdown reflex to subside.
- Nurse early and often – at least 10 times per 24 hours. Don't skip feedings (even at night).
- Nurse on baby's cues ("on demand"). If baby is very sleepy: wake baby to nurse every 2–3 hours, allowing one longer stretch of 4–5 hours at night.
- Allow baby to finish the first breast before offering the other side. Switch sides only once baby pulls off or falls asleep. Don't limit baby's time at the breast.

Pumping off milk should be done only with the guidance of an experienced breastfeeding counselor, as part of a unilateral ad lib protocol.
