= Mila's Keeper =

American breastfeeding product manufacturer

Mila's Keeper is an American company that manufactures breastfeeding and breast milk storage products. It is primarily known for its MilKeeper portable breast milk cooler. It was founded by Lara Vu in Long Beach, California.

== Company history ==
The company was founded by Lara Vu, who conceived of the idea behind the product while working on a UNICEF project to establish corporate lactation spaces for factories in Vietnam. The company launched its products on August 1, 2022.

Mila's Keeper is involved in various corporate social responsibility initiatives. The company received Certified B Corporation status in January 2025. The business is designated as a California Benefit Corporation, and is a partner of the National WIC Association and 1% for the Planet.

== Products ==
Mila's Keeper's best known product is the MilKeeper, a breast milk cooler that functions similarly to a thermos with a cold pack. The MilKeeper has been included in baby registry recommendations by publications including Harper's Bazaar, The Strategist, Motherly, HGTV, and The Cut. The product has also appeared in registry and shopping guides published by Babylist. Time named the MilKeeper in their "The Best Inventions of 2024" list under the parenting category.

The company also manufactures glass and silicone breast milk storage bottles.
