= Pump and dump (disambiguation) =

Pump and dump may refer to:

- Pump and dump, a form of securities fraud
- The practice of discarding pumped breast milk tainted with alcohol, drugs or allergens that may harm an infant
- A one-night stand
