= Lactation consultant =

Health professional

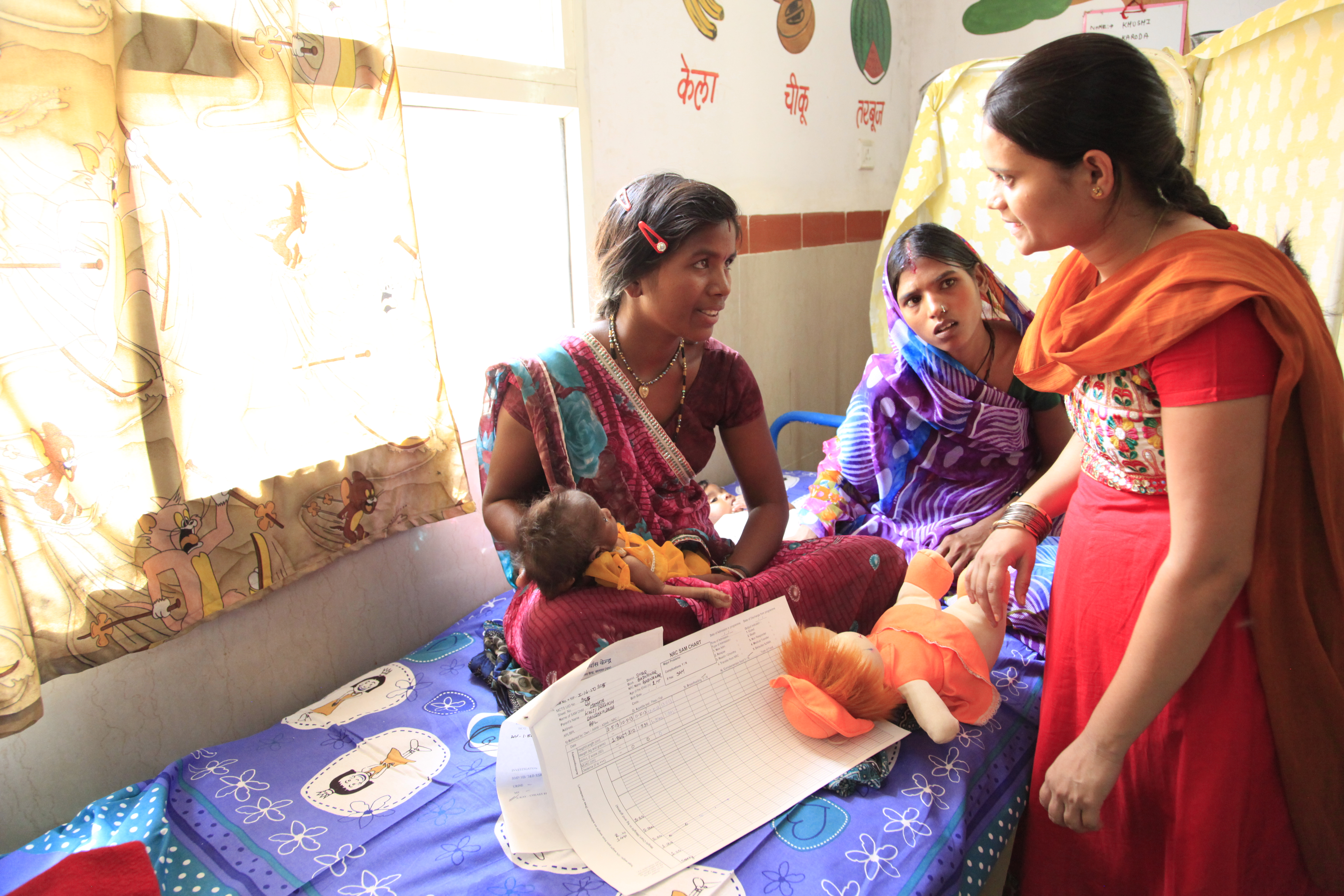
Teaching the importance of breastfeeding in a nutrition rehabilitation clinic in Madhya Pradesh, India

A lactation consultant is a health professional who specializes in the clinical management of breastfeeding. The International Board of Lactation Consultant Examiners (IBLCE) certifies lactation consultants who meet its criteria and have passed its exam.

== Description ==
Lactation consultants are trained to assist parents in preventing and solving breastfeeding difficulties such as sore nipples and low milk supply. They commonly work in hospitals, physician or midwife practices, public health programs, and private practice. In the United States, lactation consultants are often nurses, midwives, nurse practitioners, and dieticians who have obtained additional certification.

The IBLCE (International Board of Lactation Consultant Examiners) committee is the only entity authorized to accredit IBCLC Lactation Consultants.

== History and organization ==
The IBLCE was founded by a group of La Leche League leaders who wanted to professionalize the skills they had developed while working with breastfeeding individuals. Candidates can choose various pathways to qualify, including options for current health professionals and volunteers, through college or university academic programs, or through mentoring.

An International Board Certified Lactation Consultant (IBCLC) may use the post nominals IBCLC and/or RLC after their name. The International Lactation Consultant Association (ILCA) is the professional association for lactation consultants.

IBCLCs undergo specialized training to assist families with breastfeeding, milk production issues, and pump management issues. IBCLCs must meet certification requirements for education and clinical experience, and pass an examination. IBCLCs must also re-certify every five years with 75 continuing education hours every five years or take an examination.

== Outcomes ==
Exclusive and partial breastfeeding are more common among individuals who gave birth in IBCLC-equipped hospitals. In maternity hospitals, a ratio of one IBCLC for every 15 postpartum individuals is suggested. The U.S. Surgeon General recommends that all communities ensure access to services provided by IBCLCs. Evidence found that breastfeeding interventions including lactation consultants and counselors increased the number of individuals initiating breastfeeding. A systematic review on characteristics and outcomes of postpartum care found that when individuals receive care from a lactation consultant they are more likely to present higher rates of any breastfeeding at six months (but not at one or three months), and higher rates of exclusive breastfeeding at one or three months.

== See also ==
- Lactation counselor
- Postpartum confinement, the period after childbirth when the new parents rests and bonds with their newborn, as they both learn to breastfeed
- Wet nurse, a woman paid to nurse another individual's baby
- Newborn care specialists, a type of nanny
