= Low milk supply =

- Specialty: Breastfeeding medicine

In breastfeeding women, low milk supply, also known as lactation insufficiency, insufficient milk syndrome, agalactia, agalactorrhea, hypogalactia or hypogalactorrhea, is the production of breast milk in daily volumes that do not fully meet the nutritional needs of her infant.

Breast milk supply augments in response to the baby's demand for milk, and decreases when milk is allowed to remain in the breasts. Low milk supply is usually caused by allowing milk to remain in the breasts for long periods of time, or insufficiently draining the breasts during feeds. It is usually preventable, unless caused by medical conditions that have been estimated to affect five to fifteen percent of women.

Several common misconceptions often lead mothers to believe they have insufficient milk when they are in fact producing enough. Actual low milk supply is likely if the baby is latching and swallowing well at the breast, is nevertheless not growing well or is showing signs of dehydration or malnutrition, and does not have a medical condition that would explain the lack of growth. The main method for increasing milk supply is improved breastfeeding practices and/or expressing milk through pumping or hand expression. The medication domperidone increases milk supply for some women. For mothers who cannot breastfeed exclusively, breastfeeding as much as possible, with supplementary formula feeding as necessary, offers many benefits over formula alone.

== Causes ==
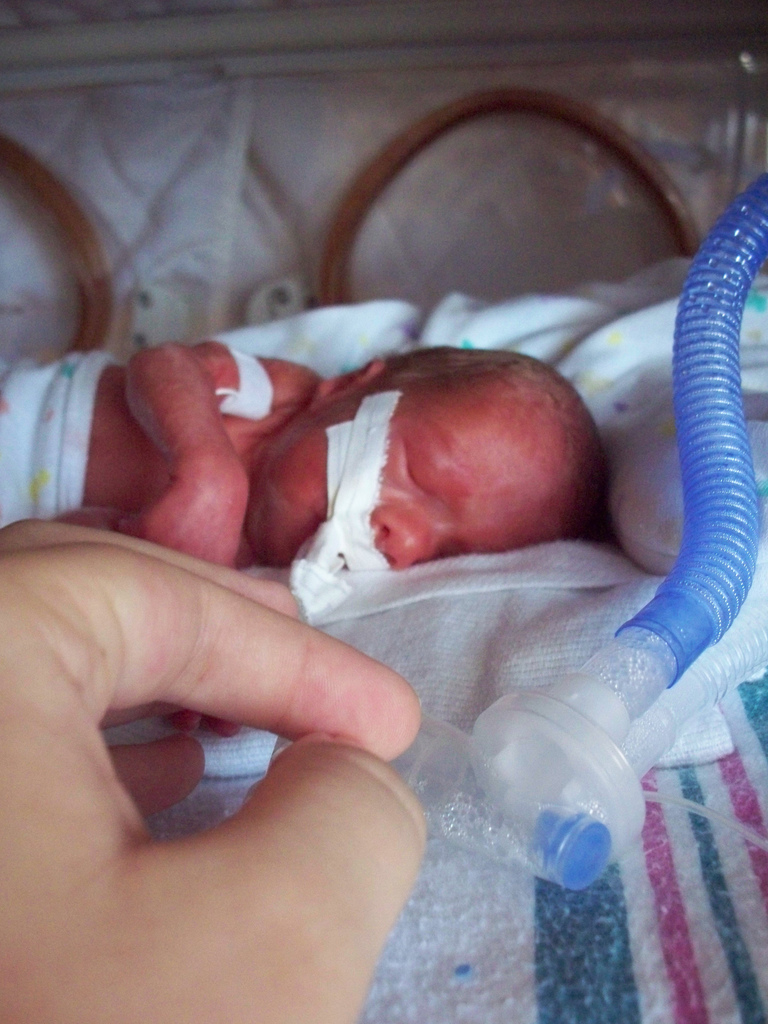
Many premature infants cannot suck effectively, which can lead to decreased milk production in the mother.

Low milk supply can be either primary (caused by medical conditions or anatomical issues in the mother), secondary (caused by not thoroughly and regularly removing milk from the breasts) or both. Secondary causes are far more common than primary ones. One study found that 15% of healthy first-time mothers had low milk supply 2–3 weeks after birth, with secondary causes accounting for at least two-thirds of those cases.

Breastfeeding management issues that can interfere with regular milk drainage from the breast include poor latch, unnecessary use of supplemental formula, timed or scheduled feedings (as opposed to on-demand feedings), and overuse of pacifiers. Medical conditions in the infant that result in weak or unco-ordinated sucking can cause low milk supply by inhibiting the transfer of milk to the baby. These conditions include tongue-tie, congenital heart defects, prematurity, and Down syndrome.

Primary causes of low milk supply include:

- insufficient glandular tissue, also known as primary lactation failure. Breasts with insufficient glandular tissue often have a tubular shape, with a large space between the breasts, and often do not grow during pregnancy.
- retained placenta
- Sheehan's syndrome
- prior breast surgery (especially breast reduction)
- prior nipple piercing
- polyendocrine metabolic ovarian syndrome (PMOS)
- hypothyroidism
- hypoprolactinemia
- theca lutein cysts
- hypertension
- pregnancy

Smoking more than 15 cigarettes per day is associated with reduced milk production. Many medications are known to significantly suppress milk production, including pseudoephedrine, diuretics, and contraceptives that contain estrogen. It is suspected that some herbs, particularly sage and peppermint, suppress milk production.

== Mechanism ==
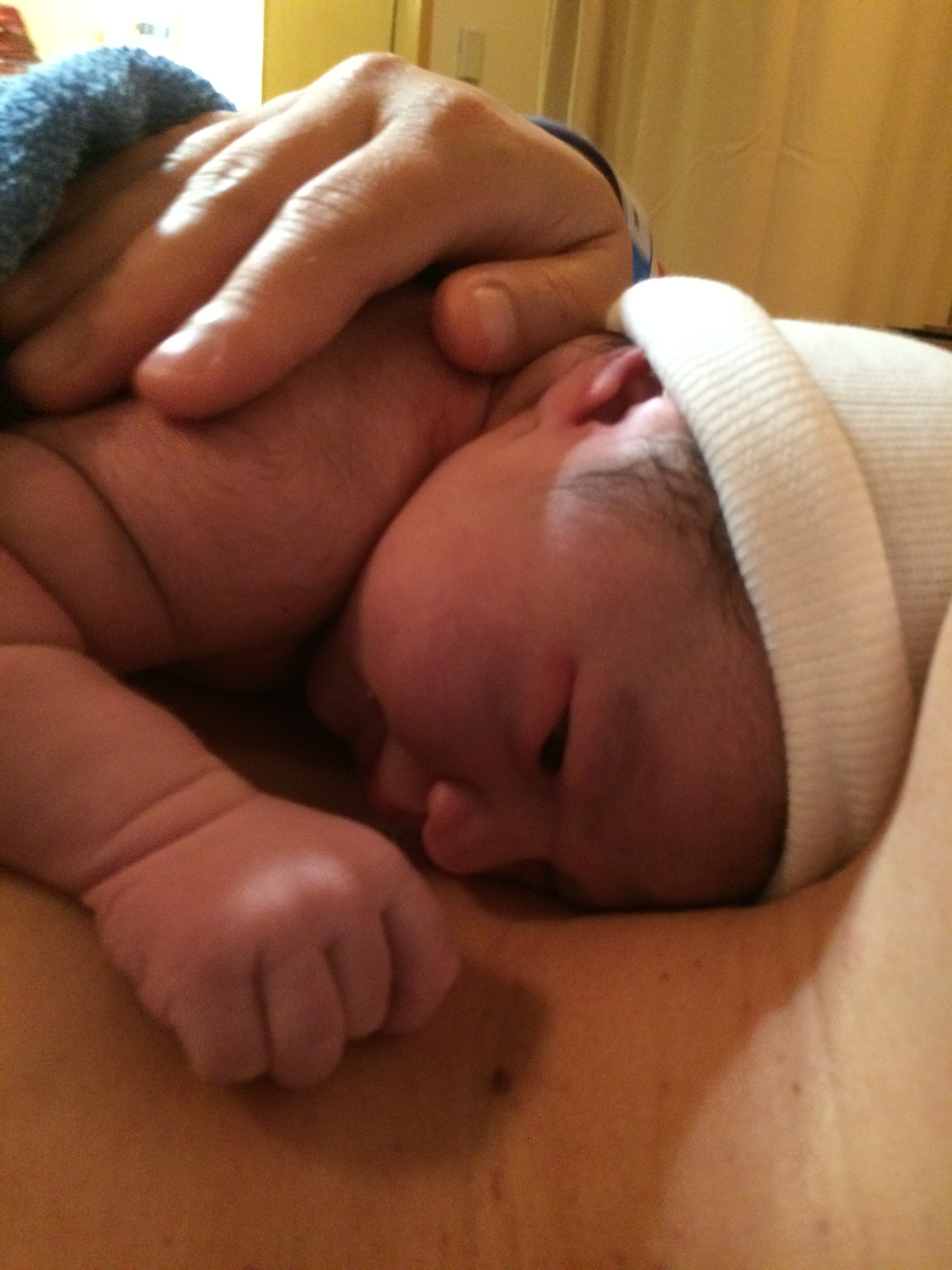
Early skin-to-skin contact between mother and newborn promotes the establishment of a plentiful milk supply.

The physiological mechanisms that regulate breast milk supply are poorly understood. High levels of prolactin are necessary for lactation, however there is no direct correlation between baseline levels of prolactin and quantity of milk production. One aspect of supply regulation that has been identified is that breast milk contains a peptide called feedback inhibitor of lactation (FIL). When milk is present in the breast, FIL inhibits the secretion of milk. After a mother's milk comes in, a reduction in supply is inevitable unless milk is removed regularly and thoroughly from the breasts.

Surgery or injury to the breast can decrease supply by disrupting milk ducts that carry milk from the alveoli, where milk is produced, to the nipple. Retained placenta results in high levels of progesterone, a hormone that inhibits lactation.

== Diagnosis ==
A woman's belief that her milk supply is insufficient is one of the most common reasons for discontinuing breastfeeding. In many of those cases, the woman's milk supply is actually normal. After a few weeks or months of breastfeeding, changes that are commonly mistaken for signs of low milk supply include breasts feeling softer (this is normal after 1–3 months), more frequent demands by the infant to feed, feeds becoming shorter over time, baby colic, the perception that the baby is more satisfied after being fed infant formula, and a slowdown in growth after three months.

To evaluate whether milk supply is actually insufficient, qualitative parameters should be used such as the following:

- By 3–5 days, of age, the infant should be stooling 3–4 times per day and urinating 3–5 times per day. By 5–7 days of age, there should be 3–6 stools per day and 4–6 urines.
- The infant should be alert, have good muscle tone, and show no signs of dehydration.
- The infant should be consistently gaining weight and growing. In newborns, a loss of more than 5 to 7 percent of birth weight warrants investigation. The use of IV fluids in labour tends to artificially increase the birth weight of the baby, and subsequently inflate the baby's weight loss. Newborns should regain their birth weight by two weeks of age, and gain at least 150 g per week.

If an infant is not showing these signs of growing well, other possible causes include:

- Poor milk transfer due to tongue-tie, or cleft palate.
- Medical conditions in the infant, such as malabsorption of nutrients.

=== Definition ===
A mother is considered to have low milk supply if she produces less breast milk than her infant requires. The term is used only after a mother's milk "comes in", which usually occurs around 30–40 hours after delivery of a full-term infant. Low milk supply is distinct from the scenario in which the mother's milk comes in later than normal but is thereafter produced in sufficient quantities; this is known as delayed onset of lactation (delayed lactogenesis II).

== Prevention ==
The first week after birth is a critical window for establishing milk supply. The Ten Steps of the Baby Friendly Hospital Initiative describe some maternity hospital practices that promote the development of a good milk supply, such as rooming in (allowing mothers and infants to remain together 24 hours a day) and having trained staff available to help mothers with breastfeeding. Supplemental formula or donor milk should be given only when medically necessary.

There is increasing evidence that suggests that early skin-to-skin contact between mother and baby stimulates breastfeeding behavior in the baby. Newborns who are immediately placed on their mother's skin have a natural instinct to latch on to the breast and start nursing, typically within one hour of birth. Immediate skin-to-skin contact may provide a form of imprinting that makes subsequent feeding significantly easier. Interrupting the process, such as removing the baby to weigh him/her, may complicate subsequent feeding.

Frequent suckling in the first days of life is correlated with higher milk production. Infants should be fed when they show signs of hunger. It is common for breastfed babies to feed during the night for the first six months. Usually feedings last 10–15 minutes in the early days.

If the infant is unable to breastfeed, it is recommended that pumping or hand expression of milk begin within two hours of delivery, and be done at least eight times every 24 hours.

== Management ==
In this video, a mother uses breast compression during a feed to increase the flow of milk (1 minute, 37 seconds)

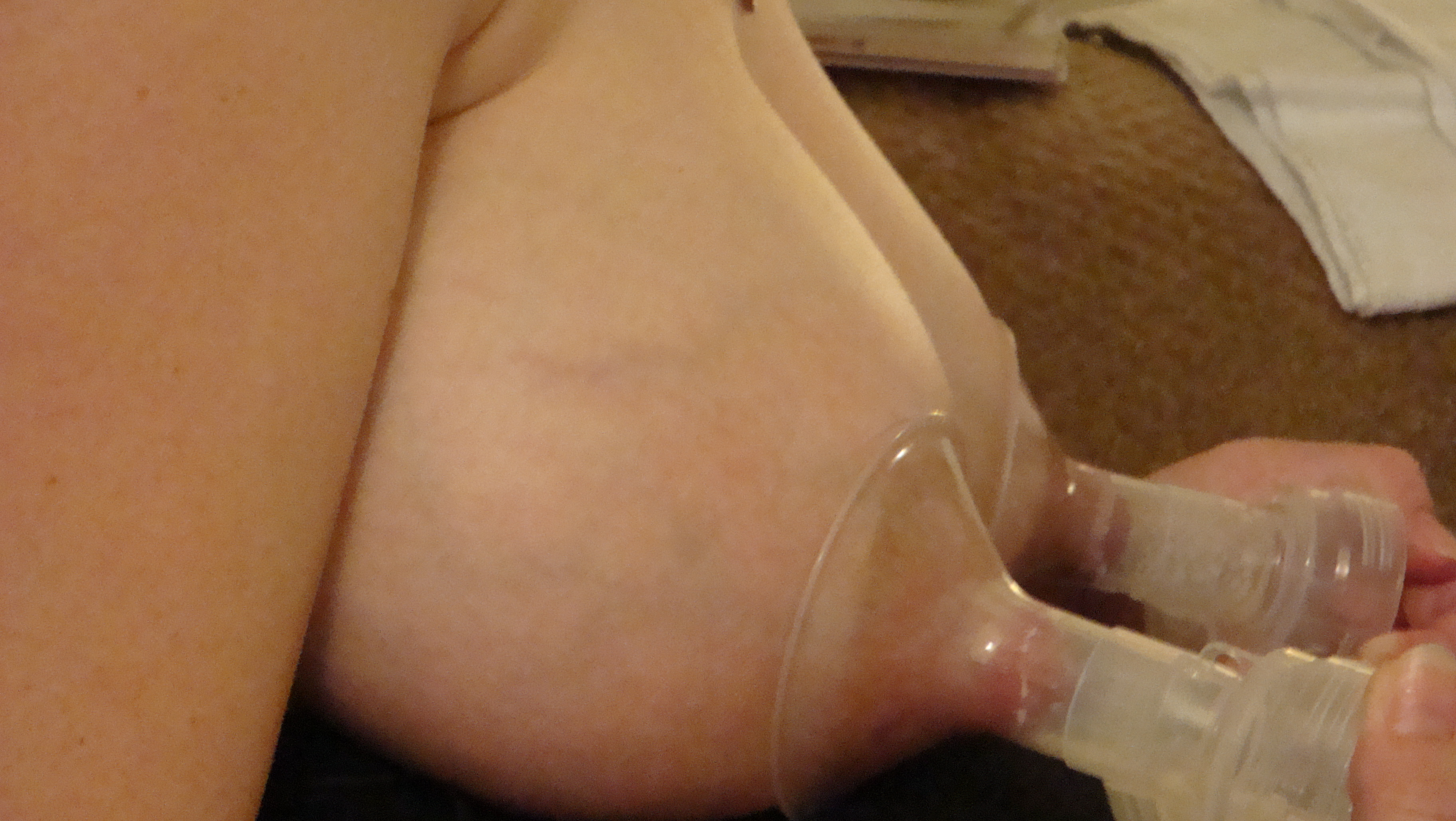
Using a breast pump can maintain and improve milk supply if the baby is unable to nurse effectively.

Attempts to increase milk supply should begin promptly as the longer low supply continues, the more difficult it is to reverse. The primary method for increasing milk supply is to increase the frequency and the thoroughness of milk drainage from the breasts, and to increase breast stimulation.

For mothers of healthy term infants who are able to nurse, very strong evidence supports improving breastfeeding practices as a primary treatment. Increasing skin-to-skin contact between mother and baby, and allowing unrestricted breastfeeding, aid in stimulating the milk ejection reflex and promote frequent feeds. If the baby's latch is not optimal, improving the latch will help the baby drink more milk. Making the mother comfortable, particularly by resolving nipple pain, is essential. Breast self-massage is recommended to stimulate the milk ejection reflex and to physically promote the flow of milk. Some experts recommend using a breast pump after each breastfeeding session.

If the baby cannot nurse effectively, frequent drainage of milk from the breasts through hand expression and/or an electric double breast pump is recommended.

The mother's use of medications and herbs should be evaluated, as some substance suppress lactation. The Academy of Breastfeeding Medicine protocol for low milk supply recommends that the mother be evaluated for medical causes of the problem, however health professionals and breastfeeding counsellors often do not do this.

=== Medications and herbs ===
After the above treatment methods have been attempted, many breastfeeding specialists and lactation consultants recommend medications or herbs that are believed to increase milk supply (galactagogues). In 2010, a randomized, double-blinded, placebo-controlled study demonstrated that domperidone increased milk production in mothers of preterm infants. Another very small study of domperidone found that some women respond to it and others do not. As the effects of domperidone stop when use of the drug is stopped, it is sometimes used for months. Domperidone is available by prescription in Canada, Australia, many parts of Europe, and other countries, but not in the United States.

Several herbs, including fenugreek and milk thistle are traditionally and widely used with the intention of promoting milk supply. For these herbs, there are anecdotal reports of efficacy which may be due to placebo effect. Scientific evidence for the efficacy of herbal galactagogues is insufficient or nonexistent. The Academy of Breastfeeding Medicine protocol for low milk supply says that there is insufficient data to recommend specific medicinal or herbal galactagogues, but that some substances may be useful in some cases.

A Cochrane review showed that, despite the relatively large number of randomised controlled trials investigating medical and natural galactogogues, it is uncertain whether galactogogues have any effect on breastfeeding rates.

=== Supplementary feeding ===
If the mother's milk supply is insufficient, formula or (preferably) donor milk is necessary in order for the infant to obtain adequate nutrients. Supplements should be given immediately after a breastfeeding session, rather than in place of a breastfeeding session. Given the importance of breastfeeding for infants, regardless of age, the option of relactation becomes beneficial by assisting in infant nutrition as well as strengthening the maternal bond.

The use of supplements is gradually tapered off as the mother's own milk supply rebounds. In some cases, especially when low supply is caused by medical conditions such as insufficient glandular tissue, long-term use of supplements is necessary. For mothers who cannot breastfeed exclusively, breastfeeding as much as possible, with formula feeding as necessary, offers many benefits over formula alone.

== See also ==
- Breastfeeding difficulties
- Lactation

== Bibliography ==
- Lawrence, Ruth (2016). Breastfeeding: a guide for the medical profession, 8th edition. Philadelphia, PA: Elsevier. ISBN 978-0-323-35776-0.
