= Lactation room =

Private space where a nursing mother can use a breast pump

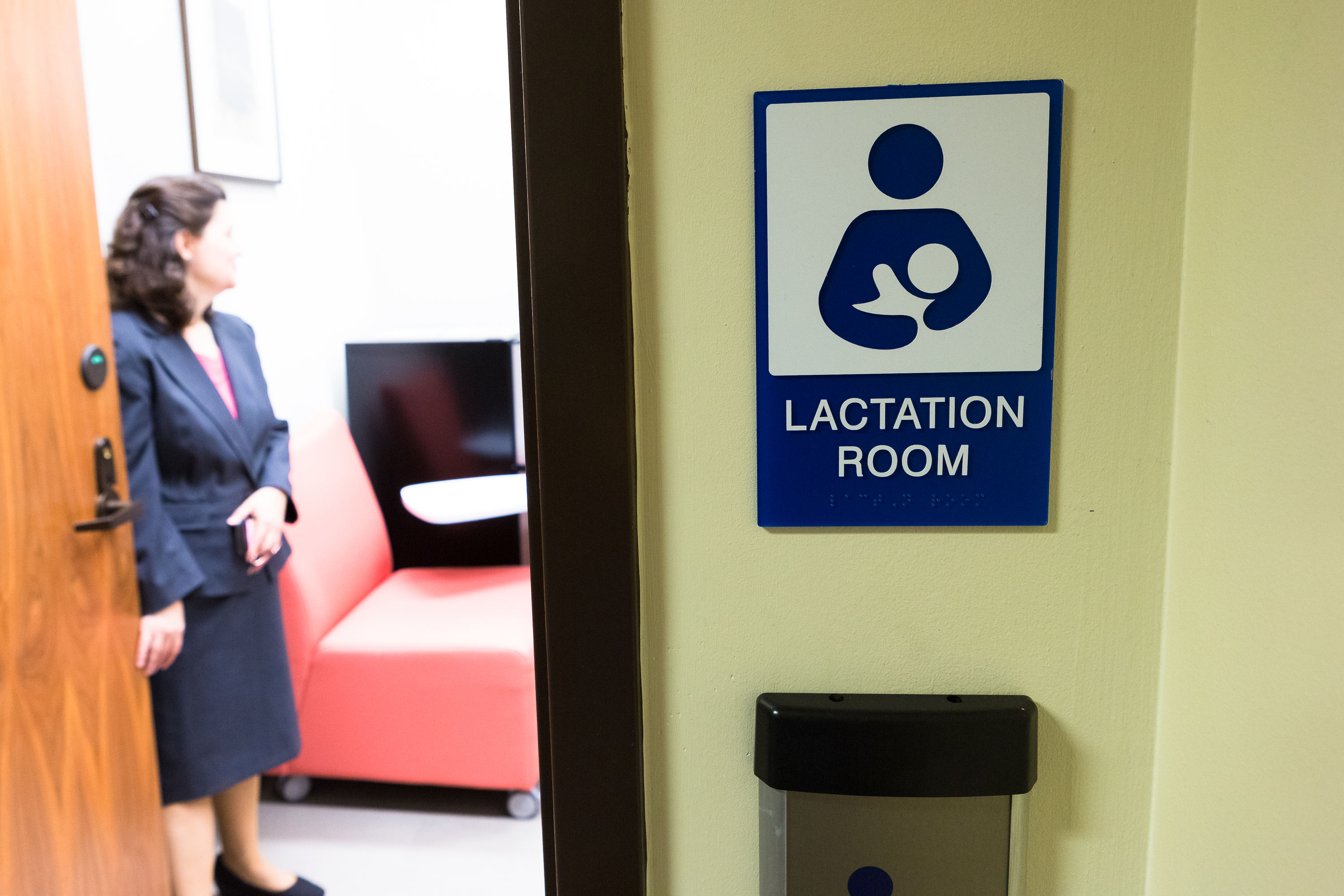
Lactation room at the US Department of Labor, 2016

A lactation room (or lactorium) is a private space where a nursing mother can breastfeed. They may include breast pumps. The development is mostly confined to the United States, which is unique among developed countries in providing minimal maternity leave.

== Purpose and description ==
Lactation rooms provide breastfeeding mothers with a private space to pump or nurse. While lactation spaces existed prior to the 2010 Patient Protection and Affordable Care Act, the amended Section 4207 of the Fair Labor Standards Act requires employers with 50 employees or more to provide a private space for nursing mothers that's not a bathroom.

Generally, a lactation room includes a refrigerator, sink, cleaning supplies, table, and comfortable chair. The ability to pump throughout the day allows mothers to keep up their milk supply and enables them to save and take home the nutrient-rich milk they have pumped.

== Popularity ==
Lactation rooms have become widely popular in the US business setting. The reason for this development is that

mothers are the fastest-growing segment of the U.S. labor force. Approximately 70% of employed mothers with children younger than 3 years work full time. One-third of these mothers return to work within 3 months after giving birth and two-thirds return within 6 months. Working outside the home is related to a shorter duration of breastfeeding, and intentions to work full-time are significantly associated with lower rates of breastfeeding initiation and shorter duration.

== Benefits ==
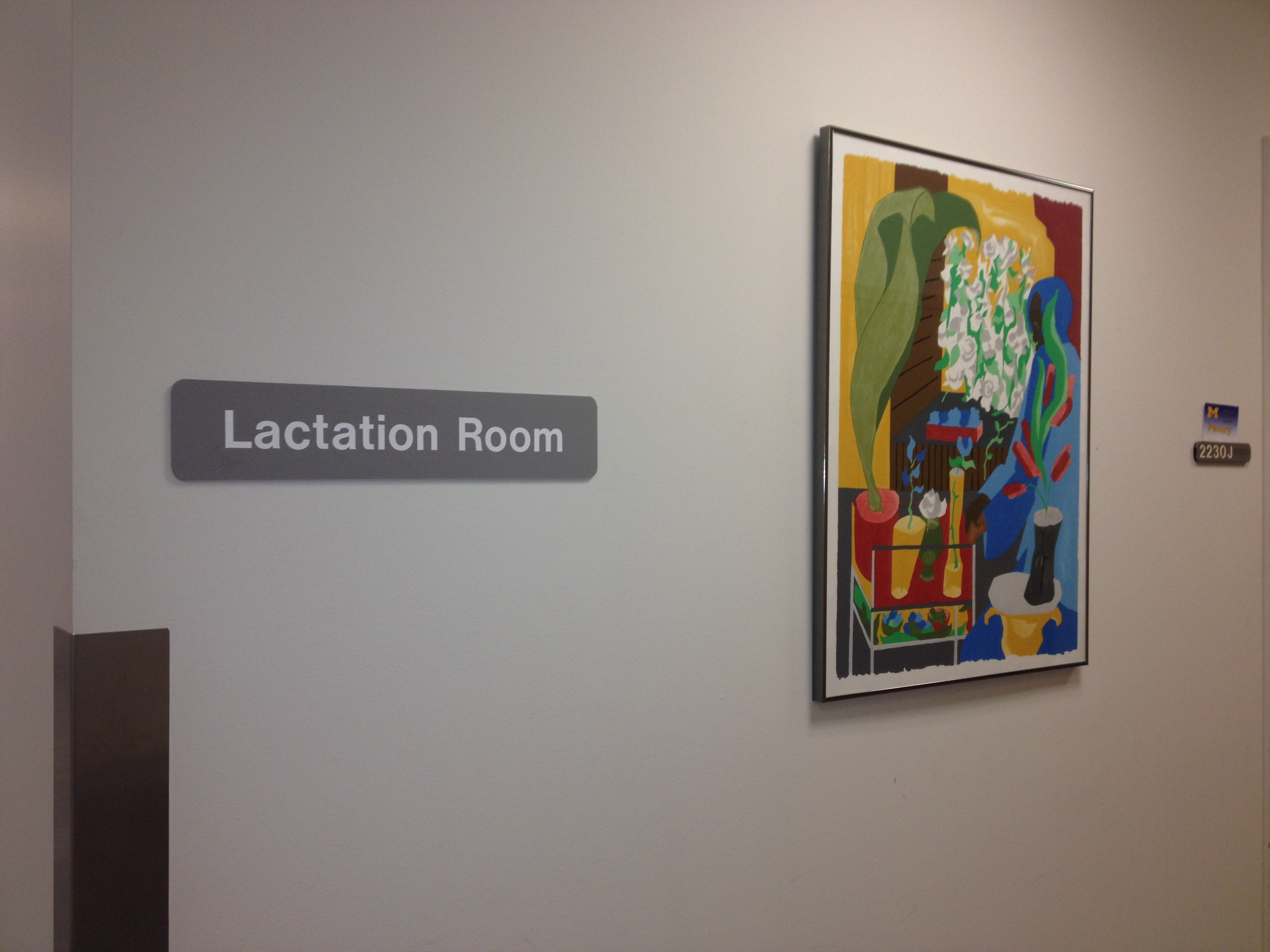
Lactation room at the University of Michigan, in 2014

In addition, breastfeeding benefits employers as breastfeeding results in decreased health claims, increased productivity, and fewer days missed from work to care for sick children.

One example of the benefits provided to businesses and employees by establishing a corporate lactation program is that of CIGNA, a US employee benefits company. In 1995, CIGNA established the “Working Well Moms” program, which provided lactation education program and lactation rooms. In 2000, CIGNA and the UCLA conducted a study of 343 breastfeeding women who were taking part in CIGNA’s program. The study revealed a savings of $240,000 annually in health care expenses for breastfeeding mothers and their children, and a savings of $60,000 annually through reduced absenteeism among breastfeeding mothers at CIGNA. In addition, the study found that "breastfeeding duration for women enrolled in the Working Well Moms program is 72.5% at six months compared to a 21.1 percent national average of employed new mothers."

== Resources ==
A variety of resources exist for breastfeeding mother and employers on how to establish and promote a lactation room or lactation support program. The following are currently available:

- American Institute of Architects' Lactation Room Design
- Center for Disease Control’s Healthy Workplace Initiative
- US Dept. of Health and Human Services’ Healthy People 2010

In addition, the US Department of Health and Human Services, Maternal and Child Health Bureau is currently developing a toolkit to promote breastfeeding in the workplace called “The Business Case for Breastfeeding”.

== Notes ==
- "H.R. 3590 – One Hundred Eleventh Congress of the United States of America – At the Second Session" (PDF).

== See also ==
- Break room
- Breastmilk storage and handling
