= Lactation counselor =

Type of healthcare provider

A lactation counselor is a healthcare provider recognized as an expert in the fields of human lactation and breastfeeding counseling. A certified lactation counselor will carry the initials CLC after her/his name. Lactation counselors can be found working as staff in hospitals, at physician and midwife offices, in private practice, and in the public health sector.

The candidates for the certified lactation counselor credential qualify for this designation by passing the didactic and written examinations of the Academy of Lactation Policy and Practice. CLCs can earn advanced certification in lactation management. The Advanced lactation consultant possesses the insight, knowledge, and skills essential to the development and implementation of management strategies for complex problems related to breastfeeding and human lactation
