= Breastfeeding difficulties =

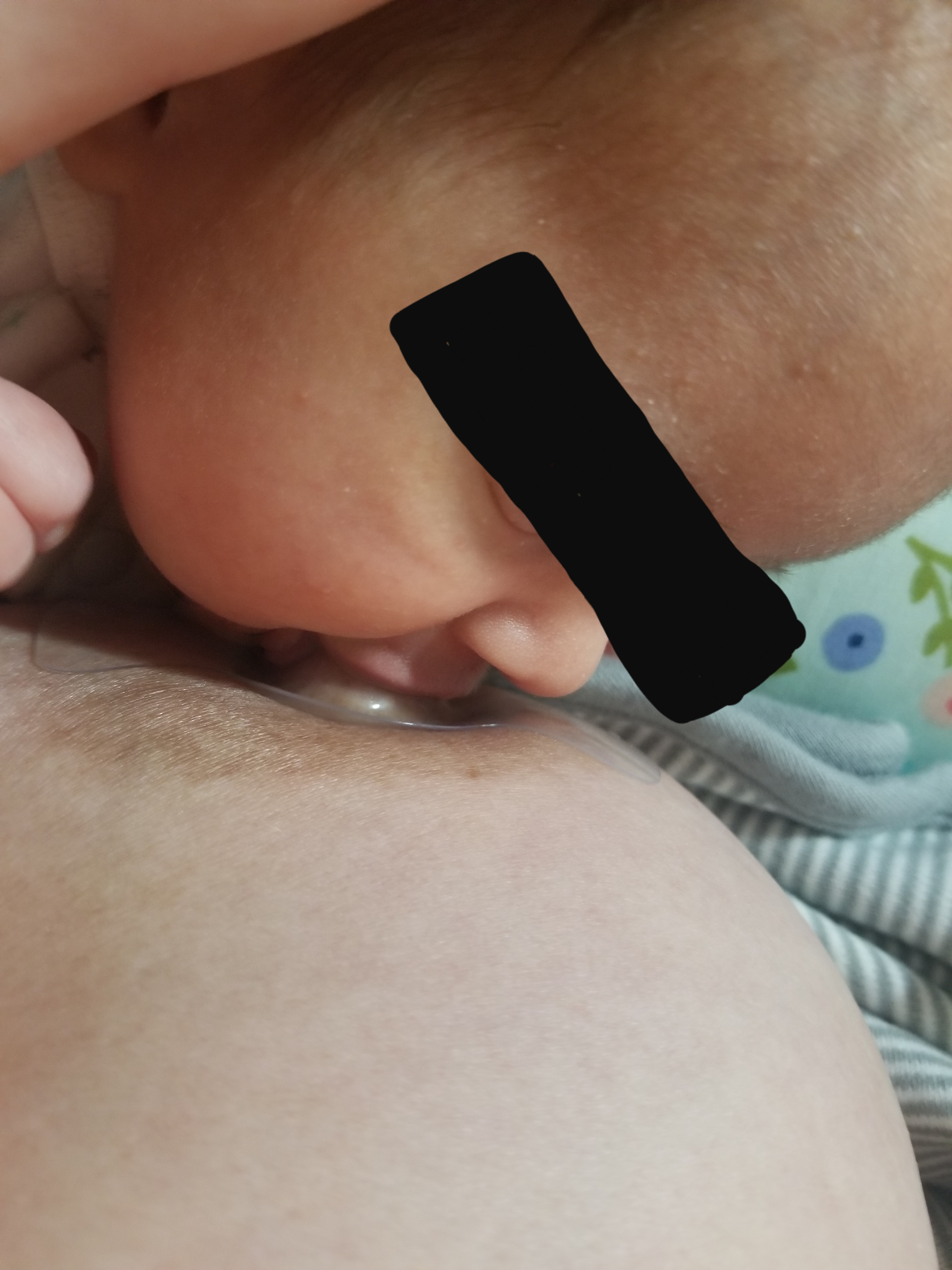
- Infant nurses through nipple shield, a device which can assist with certain breastfeeding difficulties.
- Specialty: Obstetrics, pediatrics, midwifery

Breastfeeding difficulties refers to problems that arise from breastfeeding, the feeding of an infant or young child with milk from a woman's breasts. Although babies have a sucking reflex that enables them to suck and swallow milk, and human breast milk is usually the best source of nourishment for human infants, there are circumstances under which breastfeeding can be problematic, or even in rare instances, contraindicated.

Difficulties can arise both in connection with the act of breastfeeding and with the health of the nursing infant.

== Breastfeeding problems ==
While breastfeeding difficulties are not uncommon, putting the baby to the breast as soon as possible after birth helps to avoid many problems. The policy of the American Academy of Pediatrics on breastfeeding instructs to, "delay weighing, measuring, bathing, needle-sticks, and eye prophylaxis until after the first feeding is completed." Many breastfeeding difficulties can be resolved with research based hospital procedures, properly trained nurses and hospital staff, speech pathologists and lactation consultants. Another source of information is the volunteer-based breastfeeding promotion organization, La Leche League.

A variety of factors and conditions can interfere with successful breastfeeding:

- Ankyloglossia (tongue tie)
- Formula feeding
- Distractions or interruptions during feeds
- Long separations from the mother
- Tachypnea (rapid breathing) such as in transient tachypnea of the newborn, surfactant deficiency, respiratory distress syndrome or other infant medical conditions
- Presence of an actual physical barrier between mother and infant
- Swallowing difficulties such as with prematurity and coordination of sucking, swallowing and breathing, or gastro-intestinal tract abnormalities like tracheo-oesophageal fistula.
- Pain resulting from surgical procedures like circumcision, blood tests, or vaccinations.
- Latching onto the breast
- Hypoplastic breasts/insufficient glandular tissue
- Galactorrhea
- Lactation failure
- Polyendocrine metabolic ovarian syndrome (PMOS)
- Diabetes
- Maternal stress
- Insufficient rest/support of the mother during the first 6 weeks post-partum
- Early return to work due to lack of financial support/maternity leave of mother
- Cleft palate
- Thrush
- Hypoglycemia or hyperglycemia
- Hypotonia, or "low-tone" infant disorder
- Hyperlactation syndrome
- Overactive let-down
- Premature babies can have difficulties coordinating their sucking reflex with breathing. They may need to be fed more frequently because their stomachs tend to be smaller, and they may get sleepier during feedings. Premature infants unable to take enough calories by mouth may need enteral or gavage feeding - inserting a feeding tube into the stomach to provide enough breast milk or a substitute. This is often done together with Kangaroo care (prolonged skin-to-skin contact with the mother) which makes later breastfeeding easier. For some suckling difficulties, such as may happen with cleft lip/palate, the baby can be fed with a Haberman Feeder.
- Dysphoric milk ejection reflex (D-MER) is a newly recognized condition affecting lactating women that is characterized by an abrupt dysphoria, or negative emotions that occur just before milk release and continuing not more than a few minutes. Preliminary testing tells us that D-MER is treatable and preliminary research tells us that inappropriate dopamine activity at the time of the milk ejection reflex is the cause of D-MER.

=== Low milk supply ===
- Primary lactation failure: occurs when the mother has a condition incompatible with full milk production, for example breast hypoplasia, breast reduction surgery, or bilateral mastectomy.
- Secondary lactation failure: milk production that is low due to preventable factors, such as formula supplementation, poor milk transfer by the baby, or unrelieved breast engorgement.
- Chronic low milk supply is estimated to be experienced by 10-15% of women.

=== Breast pain ===
Pain often interferes with successful breastfeeding. It is cited as the second most common cause for the abandonment of exclusive breastfeeding after perceived low milk supply.

=== Inverted nipples ===
Inverted or retracted nipples sometimes make attachment to the breast difficult. These mothers need additional support to feed their babies. Treatment is started after the birth of the baby. The nipple is manually stretched out several times a day. A pump or a plastic syringe is used to draw out the nipple and the baby is then put to the breast.

=== Engorgement ===
Breast engorgement is the sense of breast fullness experienced by most women within 36 hours of delivery. Normally, this is a painless sensation of "heaviness". Breastfeeding on demand is the primary way of preventing painful engorgement.

When the breast overfills with milk it becomes painful. Engorgement comes from not getting enough milk from the breast. It happens about 3 to 7 days after delivery and occurs more often in first time mothers. The increased blood supply, the accumulated milk and the swelling all contribute to the painful engorgement. Engorgement may affect the areola, the periphery of the breast or the entire breast, and may interfere with breastfeeding both from the pain and also from the distortion of the normal shape of the areola/nipple. This makes it harder for the baby to latch on properly for feeding. Latching may occur over only part of the areola. This can irritate the nipple more, and may lead to ineffective drainage of breast milk and more pain. Reverse pressure softening (RPS) is a technique that can soften the areola enabling deeper latching and more milk transfer; RPS involves gentle positive pressure in the direction of the chest wall from the fingertips around the areola. Engorgement may begin as a result of several factors such as nipple pain, improper feeding technique, infrequent feeding or infant-mother separation.

To prevent or treat engorgement, remove the milk from the breast, by breastfeeding, expressing or pumping. Gentle massage can help start the milk flow and so reduce the pressure. The reduced pressure softens the areola, perhaps even allowing the infant to feed. Warm water or warm compresses and expressing some milk before feeding can also help make breastfeeding more effective. Some researchers have suggested that after breastfeeding, mothers should pump and/or apply cold compresses to reduce swelling pain and vascularity even more. One published study suggested the use of "chilled cabbage leaves" applied to the breasts. Attempts to reproduce this technique met with mixed results. Nonsteroidal anti-inflammatory drugs or paracetamol (acetaminophen) may relieve the pain. A warm shower and using cold compresses to help ease the discomfort.

=== Nipple pain ===
Sore nipples (nipple pain, or thelalgia) are probably the most common complaint after the birth. They are generally reported by the second day after delivery but improve within 5 days. Pain beyond the first week, severe pain, cracking, fissures or localized swelling is not normal. The mother should see a doctor for further evaluation. Sore nipples, a common cause of pain, often come from the baby not latching on properly. Factors include too much pressure on the nipple when not enough of the areola is latched onto and an improper release of suction at the end of the feeding. Improper use of breast pumps or topical remedies can also contribute. Nipple pain can also be a sign of infection.

=== Candidiasis ===
Symptoms of candidiasis of the breast include pain, itching, burning and redness, or a shiny or white patchy appearance. The baby could have a white tongue that does not wipe clean. Candidiasis is common and may be associated with infant thrush.

Both mother and baby must be treated to get rid of this infection. First-line therapies include nystatin, ketaconazole or miconazole applied to the nipple and given by mouth to the baby. Strict cleaning of clothing and breast pumps is also required to eradicate the infection.

Another non-prescription treatment of candidia is gentian violet. It usually works, and relief is rapid. It is messy, and will stain clothing. The baby's lips will turn purple, but the purple will disappear after a few days.

=== Milk stasis ===
Milk stasis is when the milk ducts are blocked and cannot drain properly, usually due to swelling and insufficient breast emptying during the engorgement phase. This may affect only a part of the breast and is not associated with any infection. It can be treated by varying the baby's feeding position and applying heat before feeding. If it happens more than once, further evaluation is needed. Milk stasis is an urgent matter for mothers who wish to breastfeed, as failure to remove milk from the breasts causes milk production to decrease and eventually stop.

=== Mastitis ===
Mastitis is an inflammation of the breast. It causes local pain (dolor), redness (rubor), swelling (tumor), and warmth (calor). Later stages of mastitis cause symptoms of systemic infection like fever and nausea. It mostly occurs 2–3 weeks after delivery but can happen at any time. Typically results from milk stasis with primary or secondary local, later systemic infection. Infectious organisms include Staphylococcus sp., Streptococcus sp. and E. coli. Continued breastfeeding, plenty of rest and adequate fluid supply is the best treatment for light cases.

=== Overactive let-down ===
Overactive let-down (OALD) is the forceful ejection of milk from the breast during breastfeeding. The forceful spray of milk can cause the baby to consume too much milk too quickly as well as to swallow air during the period of rapid swallowing following the let-down.

=== Raynaud's of the nipple ===
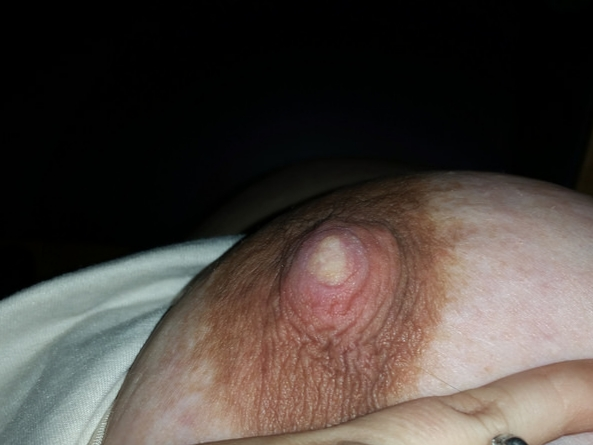
Nipple blanching, or vasospasm of the nipple

Nipple pain can be caused by vasospasm of the nipple. In essence, blood does not flow properly to the nipple which causes the nipple to blanch. This can be caused by trauma to the nipple through early breastfeeding or candidal infection of the nipple. The pain is intense during the latch stage and in between breastfeeding sessions there is a throbbing pain when the nipple is blanched. The nipple can be massaged to help blood flow return to reduce pain, as well as avoiding cold. In some instances, heart medication, nifedipine, is used to help the blood flow return to the nipple.

== Infant health problems ==
Infants with classic galactosemia cannot digest lactose and therefore cannot benefit from breast milk. Breastfeeding might harm the baby also if the mother has untreated pulmonary tuberculosis, is taking certain medications that suppress the immune system. has HIV, or uses potentially harmful substances such as cocaine, heroin, and amphetamines. Other than cases of acute poisoning, no environmental contaminant has been found to cause more harm to infants than lack of breastfeeding. Although heavy metals such as mercury are dispersed throughout the environment and are of concern to the nursing infant, the neurodevelopmental benefits of human milk tend to override the potential adverse effects of neurotoxicants.

=== Weak sucking reflex ===
Artificial teats (nipples) or dummies (pacifiers) can suppress the sucking reflex in infants. In addition, when a baby is put to the breast for shorter periods of time, milk production decreases. The time spent sucking by the infant on the pacifier or artificial teat reduces the time on the breast. The CDC also currently (2022) reports that early use of pacifiers can have a negative outcome on the success of breastfeeding and they suggest that it should be delayed until breastfeeding is firmly established.

=== Transmission of infection ===
==== Tuberculosis ====
It is not safe for mothers with active, untreated tuberculosis to breastfeed until they are no longer contagious. According to the American Academy of Pediatrics 2006 Redbook:

Women with tuberculosis who have been treated appropriately for 2 or more weeks and who are not considered contagious may breastfeed. Women with tuberculosis disease suspected of being contagious should refrain from breastfeeding or any other close contact with the infant because of potential transmission through respiratory tract droplets (see Tuberculosis, p 678). Mycobacterium tuberculosis rarely causes mastitis or a breast abscess, but if a breast abscess caused by M. tuberculosis is present, breastfeeding should be discontinued until the mother no longer is contagious.

In areas where BCG vaccination is the standard of care, the WHO provides treatment recommendations and advises mothers to continue breastfeeding. TBC may be congenital, or perinatally acquired through airborne droplet spread.

==== HIV ====
Research published in the Lancet has highlighted a lower risk of HIV transmission with exclusive breastfeeding by HIV positive mothers (4% risk), compared to mixed feeding (10-40% risk). Research on the timing of HIV transmission in 2000 revealed that a "substantial transmission occurs early during breastfeeding," concluding that 75% of all breast milk transmission had occurred within the first 6 months during a randomized control trial in Kenya. This research is of particular importance in developing countries where infant formula is not widely available or safe to prepare. In fact, the World Health Organization recommended breastfeeding in 1987 and 1992 for seropositive and seronegative women in areas where malnutrition and infectious diseases are the major cause of infant mortality. In 1996 UNAIDS issued a recommendation that women in developing countries consider the risks and benefits of each feeding practice on an individual level; they recommended women make an informed choice about infant feeding. In the days before the AIDS epidemic was clearly understood, some researchers pointed to the need to increase breastfeeding rates and pointed to the risks of formula feeding, citing increased rates of marasmus and diarrhea. D Jelliffe and E Jelliffe also criticized the marketing of infant formulas by US companies to resource-poor countries, something they termed "comerciogenic malnutrition." A more recent article from 1992 describes how the health of an infant can be compromised by water, which in many resource-poor countries holds the risk of environmental pathogens that are not present in breastmilk.

=== Substance use ===
==== Alcohol ====
Moderate alcohol consumption by breastfeeding mothers can significantly affect infants. Even one or two drinks, including beer, may reduce milk intake by 20 to 23%, leading to increased agitation and poor sleep patterns. Regular heavy drinking (more than two drinks daily) can shorten breastfeeding duration and cause issues in infants, such as excessive sedation, fluid retention, and hormonal imbalances. Additionally, higher alcohol consumption may negatively impact children's academic achievement.

"Alcohol passes to the baby in small amounts in breast milk. The milk will smell different to the baby and may affect their feeding, sleeping or digestion. The best advice is to avoid drinking shortly before a baby's feed." "Alcohol inhibits a mother's let-down (the release of milk to the nipple). Studies have shown that babies take around 20% less milk if there's alcohol present, so they'll need to feed more often – although infants have been known to go on 'nursing strike', probably because of the altered taste of the milk." "There is little research evidence available about the effect that [alcohol in breast milk] has on the baby, although practitioners report that, even at relatively low levels of drinking, it may reduce the amount of milk available and cause irritability, poor feeding and sleep disturbance in the infant. Given these concerns, a prudent approach is advised."

==== Cannabis ====
Cannabis is listed by the American Association of Pediatrics as a compound that transfers into human breast milk. Research demonstrated that certain compounds in marijuana have a very long half-life.

==== Medications ====
The vast majority of over the counter and prescription medicines are compatible with breastfeeding, but there are some that might be passed onto the child through the milk.

==== Tobacco smoke ====
If one does continue tobacco smoking after giving birth, however, it is still more beneficial to breastfeed than to completely avoid this practice altogether. There is evidence that breastfeeding offers protection against many infectious diseases, especially diarrhea. Even in babies exposed to the harmful effects of nicotine through breast milk, the likelihood of acute respiratory illness is significantly diminished when compared to infants whose mothers smoked but were formula fed. Regardless, the benefits of breastfeeding outweigh the risks of nicotine exposure.

The main concern about smoking and breastfeeding is that infants may have smoking-induced reductions to the milk iodine content. Smoking can adversely affect the lactation process by decreasing milk production and altering the milk composition. Smoking reduces daily milk output by roughly 250–300 mL. Not only will this be problematic on a daily basis for not producing enough milk, it will also cause the mother to wean her baby early. The altered milk composition also caused infants to exhibit daily behaviors such as colic and crying which can promote early weaning, again something that is not beneficial to the infant.

Also, the nicotine obtained from smoking travels through a woman into her breast milk, thus giving nicotine to her child.

Heavy use of cigarettes by the mother (more than 20 per day) has been shown to reduce the mother's milk supply and cause vomiting, diarrhoea, rapid heart rate, and restlessness in breastfed infants. Sudden Infant Death Syndrome (SIDS) is more common in babies exposed to a smoky environment. Breastfeeding mothers who smoke are counseled not to do so during or immediately before feeding their child, and are encouraged to seek advice to help them reduce their nicotine intake or quit.

==== Other substance abuse ====
With respect to alcohol, the American Academy of Pediatrics states that when breastfeeding, "moderation is definitely advised" and recommends waiting for 2 hours after drinking before nursing or pumping. A 2014 review found that "even in a theoretical case of binge drinking, the children would not be subjected to clinically relevant amounts of alcohol [through breastmilk]", and would have no adverse effects on children as long as drinking is "occasional".

If the mother consumes too much caffeine, it can cause irritability, sleeplessness, nervousness and increased feeding in the breastfed infant. Moderate use (one to two cups per day of coffee, tea, or cola) usually produces no effect. Breastfeeding mothers are advised to restrict or avoid caffeine if her baby reacts negatively to it. Cigarette smoking is thought to increase the effects of caffeine in the baby.

== Diet ==
An exclusively breastfed baby depends on breast milk completely so it is important for the mother to maintain a healthy lifestyle, and especially a good diet. Consumption of 1500–1800 calories per day could coincide with a weight loss of 450 grams (one pound) per week. While mothers in famine conditions can produce milk with highly nutritional content, a malnourished mother may produce milk with decreased levels of several micronutrients such as iron, zinc, and vitamin B_{12}. She may also have a lower supply than well-fed mothers.

There are no foods that are absolutely contraindicated during breastfeeding, but a baby may show sensitivity to particular foods that the mother eats.

== Workplaces ==
Many mothers have to return to work soon after their babies have been born. If their employers and fellow employees do not support mothers in breastfeeding (for example, providing a private breastfeeding room containing a fridge where mothers can express and safely store breast milk), mothers might stop breastfeeding. This is not ideal for their infants. A Cochrane review assessed the effects of workplace interventions to support and promote breastfeeding among mothers returning to work after the birth of their babies. The review authors comprehensively searched in 2012 for studies addressing this question but found no eligible studies. "The return to work can impact the amount of breastmilk that your body produces due to the stress and changes of leaving your baby."
