= Hyperlactation syndrome =

Condition where breast milk overflow occurs

Hyperlactation syndrome is a condition where breast milk overflow occurs because of increased milk production. The milk may come out fast and forcibly, making it difficult for the baby to nurse well.

Symptoms for the mother include breasts that never feel soft and comfortable, even after feeding, mastitis, blocked ducts and sore nipples. Elisabeth Anderson Sierra broke the Guinness World Record for the largest breastmilk donation by an individual, recorded to be 1,599.68 L (422.59 US gal).

== Signs ==
=== Mother signs ===
The mother's breast may feel full and engorged all the time. There may be pain in the breast while feeding as well as leakage of milk in between sessions.

=== Baby's signs ===
Most babies rarely react to a larger flow of milk since they might actually require that much and usually get confused while breastfeeding.

== Causes ==
Some mothers make too much milk while others make too little, and for most of them it's a matter of syncing with their baby's needs. Occasionally however, the mother will continue to overproduce milk even after her supply is established.
