= Breastmilk storage and handling =

Breast milk is recommended by numerous health authorities across the world, including the World Health Organization, UNICEF, and the American Academy of Pediatrics, as the optimal exclusive source of nutrition for infants from birth up to six months. Expressing and storing breast milk allows parents to sustain breastfeeding for a longer period of time. However, different storage practices may alter the composition of breast milk, such as variations in fat content, antioxidants, lactoferrin, and immune components. Further, improper handling and storage may increase bacterial growth in breast milk which makes it unsafe for consumption.

== Breastfeeding ==
=== Recommendations and benefits ===
The World Health Organization (WHO), UNICEF, and the American Academy of Pediatrics (AAP) recommend exclusive breastfeeding for infants up to 6 months, and continuing to breastfeed along with the introduction of safe complementary foods for up to 2 years or beyond, as desired by parent and child.

Breastfeeding initiation, and length of exclusivity, are associated with health benefits for infants, including lower risks of Sudden Infant Death Syndrome (SIDS), infant and neonatal mortality, infections, asthma, obesity, and diabetes. Breastfeeding parents can also experience lower rates of diabetes, high blood pressure, and breast, ovarian, and endometrial cancers.

=== Breastfeeding approaches ===
Traditionally, breastfeeding has been defined as the consumption of breastmilk by any means, be it directly at the breast, or feeding expressed breast milk. When direct feeding at the breast is not possible, expressed breast milk retains many unique nutritional and immunological qualities, and as such remains the gold standard for feeding infants. The practice of feeding infants expressed milk is common in neonatal intensive care unit (NICU) settings, where it is challenging for parents to breastfeed, but it has also expanded to other contexts and situations which allow parents to be able to offer breastmilk for more sustained periods, especially given the increased prevalence of commercial manual and electric breast pumps. In the United States about 85% of birthing parents express milk at some point during the first four months of the infant's life. Estimates of parents who exclusively express breast milk range from 5% of breastfeeding parents in the United States, to 18% in Singapore. Parents report a broad range of factors that contribute to their desire to express breast milk, including experiencing difficulties with latch, embarrassment of breastfeeding in public, the desire to have other caregivers help with feeding, return to paid work, concerns about over or under supply, and body weight considerations.

In some situations, the ability to express breast milk is linked to longer duration of breastfeeding. To ensure the safety and continued benefits of expressed breastmilk, proper handling and storage of breastmilk are essential.

== Breast milk expression ==
=== Cleaning procedures for handling breast milk ===
Hand washing with antibacterial soap is recommended before expressing and handling breast milk. If soap and water are not available, the best way to safely clean hands is through the use of an alcohol-based hand sanitizer that contains more than 60% alcohol. When expressed breast milk contains fewer bacteria at the time of expression, this leads to less bacterial growth during storage. A study examined the impact of washing breasts with antibacterial soap prior to pumping, and while it did reduce the number of bacteria, it is not routinely recommended due to logistical considerations and concerns about soap residue in the expressed breast milk.

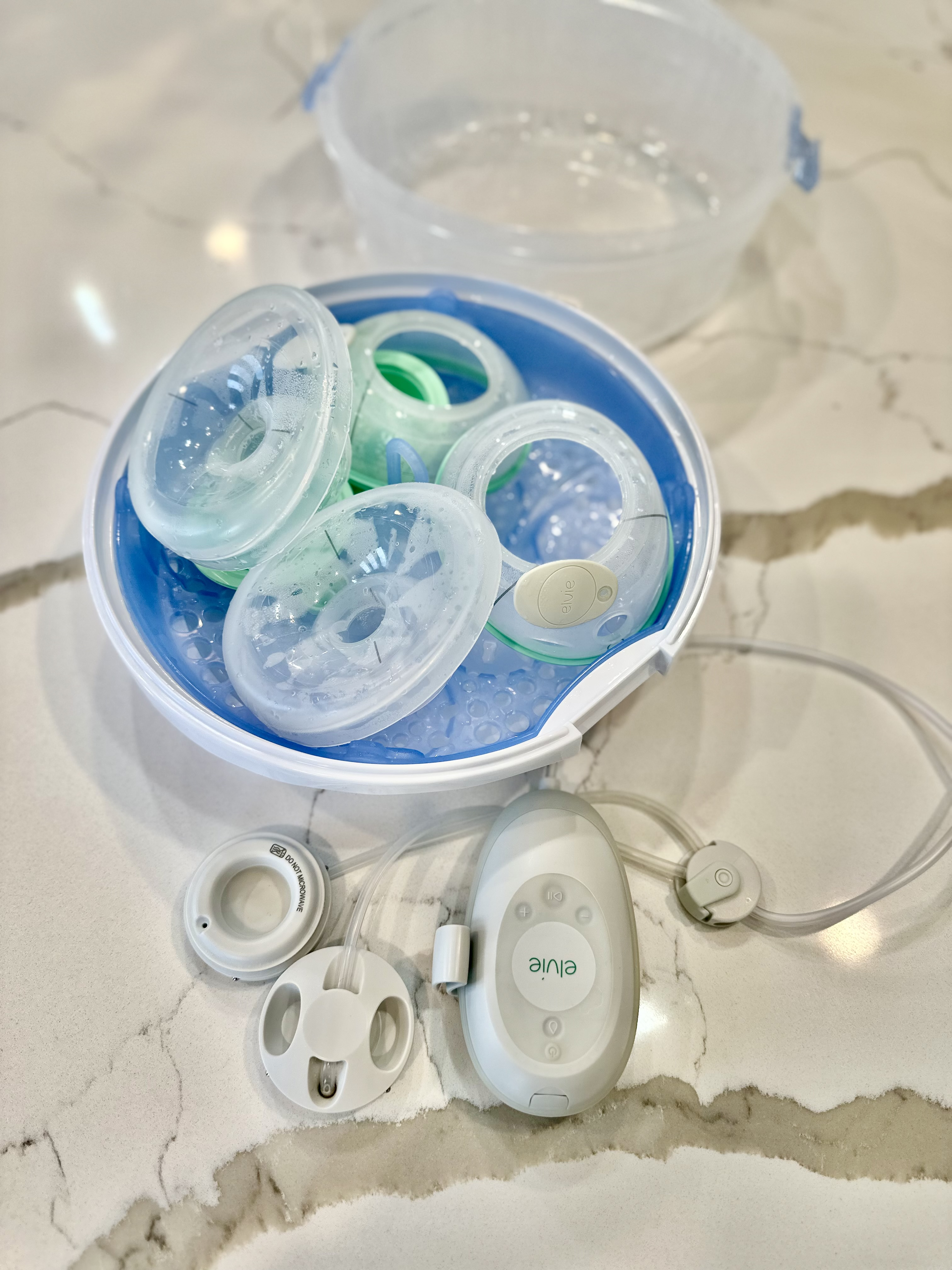
Breast pump parts in microwave sterilizer

Some studies have examined outcomes related to cleaning and disinfecting equipment used for expressing. One study found that educating parents on how to clean equipment reduced presence of bacteria, and that the main sources of contamination were containers for storage and the pump parts. However, none of the studies included in the systematic review examined the long-term impact of reduction of contamination at collection. Some studies have found an association between the levels of protein content and bacterial growth, with higher levels of protein present in expressed milk that has lower levels of bacterial growth.

In the United States the FDA (Food and Drug Administration) recommends that all equipment that comes into contact with breast milk should be cleaned after each use. To properly clean breast pump parts, each piece that came into contact with breast milk should be rinsed with cool water as soon was possible after pumping. Afterwards, each piece should be washed separately with dish soap and warm water, and then rinsed with hot water 10-15 seconds. Drying pump parts with cloth towels should be avoided because they can transmit bacteria - instead, pump parts should be placed on a paper towel or clean drying rack and allowed to air dry. Some breast pumps can be placed the top rack of the dishwasher. Although microwave sterilizers are commercially available, they do not meet the FDA definition for sterilization. Nonetheless, they are considered adequate for cleaning pump parts when used by a single user.

=== Breast milk expression methods ===
Breast milk can be done by hand expression, or through the use of a breast pump. While both approaches to breast milk expression are effective, some studies have found that breast pumps are more efficient (higher volume extracted per unit of time). With proper hand washing techniques and cleaning of breast pump parts, there is no difference in expressed breast milk contamination through manual or pump expression. Further, there is no evidence to support discarding the first few drops of expressed breast milk to reduce the risk of bacterial contamination.

Recommendations for the approach to breast milk expression depends on individual circumstances, thus recommendations by health care providers should be tailored to each parent-infant dyad.

==== Hand expression ====
Hand expression is a technique that removed breast milk through the compression of milk ducts. The CDC (Centers for Disease Control and Prevention) recommends that all lactating people learn how to express breast milk by hand as it can be helpful in emergency situations where there is no access to a breast pump, no electricity to operate a breast pump, or in cases of unexpected separation from infant. Hand expression can also help relieve engorgement, as well as stimulating milk production when parents want to increase their supply of breast milk.

==== Breast pumps ====
Breast pumps remove breast milk through suction instead of compression. There are three main types of breast pumps: manual, battery-powered, and electric. Manual pumps require a handle or lever be squeezed by the user which creates a vacuum that extracts the breast milk. Battery-powered and electric pumps rely on a small motorized pump which creates suction to collect milk. Electric pumps can also be separated into mini-electric, double electric, and hospital grade electric.

The components that come into contact with expressed milk must be sterilized in order to prevent contamination. The electric style has the advantage of greater suction and significantly greater pumping speed than the manual version as well as allowing both breasts to be pumped simultaneously. Electric breast pumps tend to be larger than manual breast pumps; however, there are portable varieties, such as those that fit inside a backpack or shoulder bag. Many electric breast pumps include battery packs (or built-in batteries) that allow them to operate while away from an outlet. Electric breast pumps can have multiple users; however, it is recommended that an accessory kit be purchased for each user to maintain hygiene.

== Breastmilk storage ==
=== Impact of storage on breast milk ===
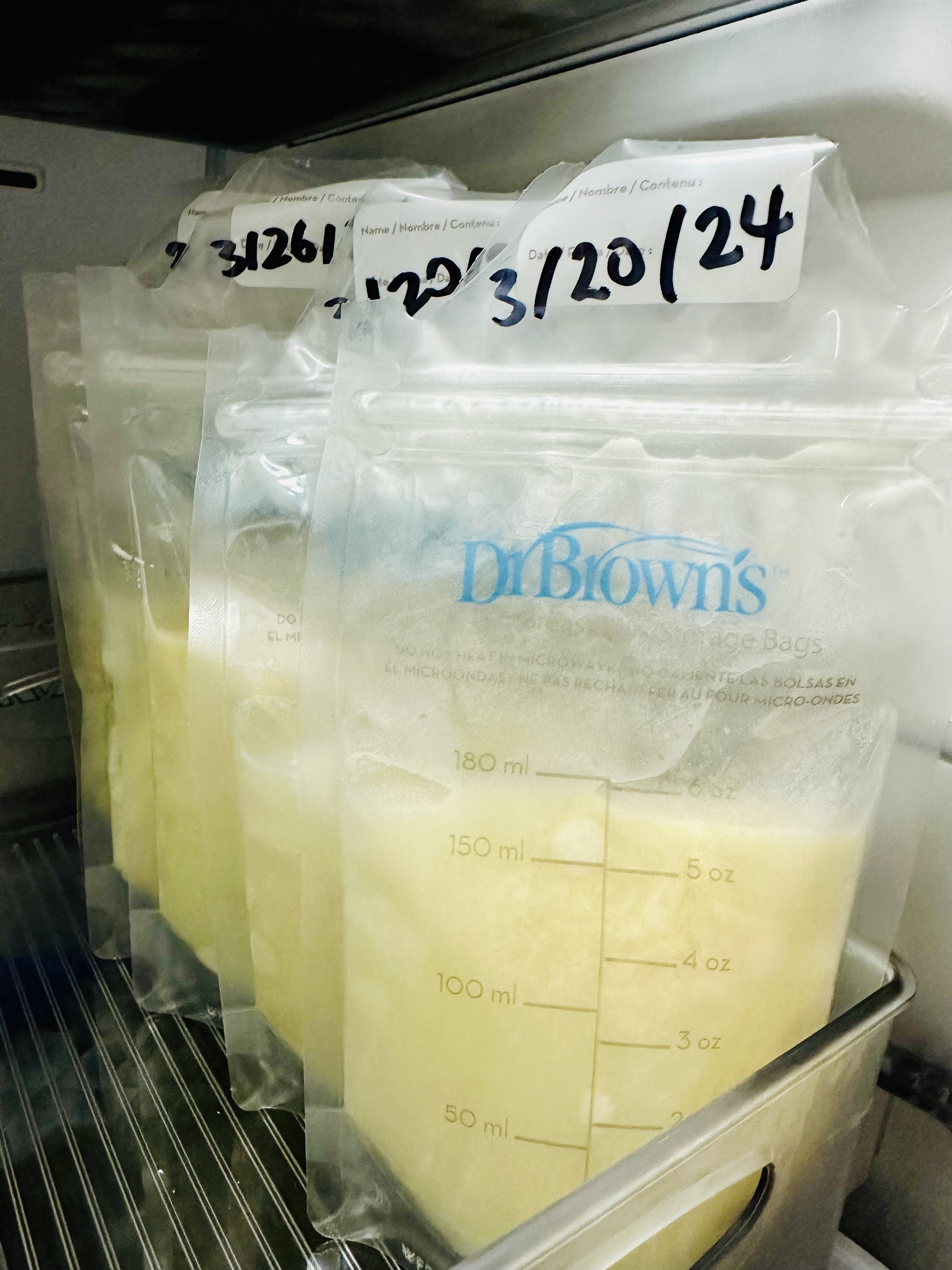
Breast milk frozen and labeled in storage bags

Storing milk in a refrigerator or freezer has been found to have an impact on different aspects of breast milk, including bacterial contamination, immunological components, and the nutritional quality. Most studies have found that the number of bacteria stays constant from the time of collection when stored at 4 to 6.8 °C for 24 to 96 hours, and the number of bacteria tends to decrease considerably (or stay stable) when stored at temperatures of −20 °C for up to 6 weeks. Further, when refrigerating instead of freezing, pyrex bottles preserved expressed breast milk's bactericidal activity better.

When comparing refrigerated and frozen expressed breast milk, breast milk refrigerated at 4 to 8 °C seems to maintain concentrations of lactoferrin comparable to fresh breast milk, while frozen milk at −20 °C has documented decreases in lactoferrin, and immunological components such as peroxidase, immunoglobulin A, and lysosomes.

In terms of nutritional components, antioxidants and fat content are not significantly impacted by storage at 6.8 °C for 96 hours or at −20 °C for (non-specified) short durations. However, storing milk at −80 °C has been demonstrated to decrease antioxidant activity and fat content considerably and is not recommended for longer than 1-2 months. One systematic review found that the total fat content of expressed breast milk did not vary by more than 10% through most storage practices, and the authors considered that most of this loss was likely to have been through adherence of fat to container surfaces. Further, the proportion of triglycerides to free fatty acids in the expressed breastmilk also vary, which is likely to enzymatic activity. The loss of fat content is important to take into consideration when calculating caloric density and energy intake for preterm and/or low-birth weight infants, and may be addressed by adding milk fortifiers to expressed breast milk.

The enzyme that breaks down fats in breast milk is called lipase, and this process can cause a soapy smell or taste in thawed milk. La Leche League recommends scalding as a way to deactivate the enzyme, and states that scalded milk is still a healthier choice than commercial infant formula. Scalding milk consists of heating the expressed milk until there are bubbles around the edges of the container (but not boiling) and then cooling quickly and freezing.

=== Recommendations for breast milk storage ===
Breast milk should be stored in special milk storage bags, or clean containers designed for breast milk storage, and clearly labeled with the date it was expressed. Containers and bags that are not intended for storing breast milk should be avoided. When bottles have the recycling symbol number 3 or 7 this indicates that the container may have BPA, thus these should be avoided for breast milk storage. Polypropylene plastics (recycling symbol 5) are safer, as are glass containers.

Many different health entities and organizations recommend different ranges for optimal temperatures and time spans for storing breastmilk. The table below provides acceptable ranges from a variety of sources included in different systematic reviews and health authority guidelines, which are recommendations provided for families with healthy, full-term babies. While there is variability on the recommendations for temperature and duration of storage, there is agreement across all sources that thawed milk should never be re-frozen.

Storage Location	Temperature	Duration	Notes
Room temperature	26 °C (78.8 °F) or lower	6-8 hours	3-4 hours is optimal at 16–29 °C and 6-8 hours only when the breast milk was collected under "very clean" conditions. Ideally, expressed breast milk should be transferred to a refrigerator or frozen as soon as possible.
Refrigerator	5 °C (41 °F) or lower	72-96 hours (3-4 days)	At 4 °C and under "very clean" conditions, this can be extended to 5 - 8 days.
Freezer compartment within a refrigerator	−15 °C (5 °F)	2 weeks	This is for freezers that do not have a separate door from the refrigerator.
Freezer with a separate door from the refrigerator	−18 °C (−0.4 °F)	3 months	Some sources consider breast milk to continue to be safe at 6 months when stored at −18 °C regardless of the type of freezer.
Deep freezer	−20 °C (−4 °F)	6-12 months	Storage up to 12 months is considered acceptable but not widely recommended.

Breast milk from different pumping sessions may be safely combined, as long as the freshly expressed milk is properly chilled in the refrigerator before adding it to a container with previously expressed milk.

If expressed breast milk will not be used within the next 4 days, it should be frozen as soon as possible. The best way to freeze breast milk to minimize waste is by freezing in 2-4 ounce increments, and leaving about one inch of space at the top of the bag or container since the breast milk will expand when it freezes. When storing frozen breast milk, the door of the freezer should be avoided as this can subject the breast milk to temperature changes when the door is opened and closed. The best spot in the freezer for storing breast milk is away from the sides and toward the back where the temperature remains the most constant.

Breast milk can be safely transported in insulated coolers with frozen ice packs for up to 24 hours, after which it should be used immediately, stored in a refrigerator, or frozen. The frozen ice packs must be in constant contact with the milk containers, and the cooler should not be opened unless absolutely necessary.

== Preparing breast milk for consumption ==
=== Thawing frozen breast milk ===
Frozen breast milk should be consumed in the order it was expressed; always using first the oldest milk available. Frozen breast milk should be prepared for consumption in one of three ways: slow thaw in the refrigerator, rapid water bath thaw at a temperature under 37 °C, or running lukewarm water; it should not be thawed in a microwave.

Once frozen breast milk has been thawed, it should not be re-frozen. If the breast milk was thawed in the refrigerator, it can be kept in the refrigerator for up to 24 hours. The 24 hours start counting from the moment the breast milk is completely thawed, and not the moment it was taken out of the freezer. Milk from different frozen batches (that come from the same person) can be pooled once they have been thawed.

Some handling practices have an impact on the reduction of total fat content, such as water bath thawing (8.5-18% total fat reduction) and microwave warming (8.5-31% total fat reduction), while room temperature thawing has been found to have no statistically significant change on total fat content. Regardless of the technique, fat often separates in breast milk, so it should be swirled prior to serving to mix the fat back in.

=== Warming breast milk ===
Despite the widespread availability of breast milk warmers, breast milk does not need to be warmed - it can be served at room temperature or cold, if the baby accepts it. If breast milk is warmed prior to consumption, the temperature must always be checked to ensure it is at a safe temperature for the baby. This can be done by putting some drops of the breast milk on one's wrist.

The CDC recommends that if there is leftover milk from a feeding (baby did not finish the bottle), it should be used in the 2 hours after the baby finished feeding, or it should be discarded.

== See also ==
- Breast milk
- Breastfeeding
- Breast pump
