= Breast pump =

Mechanical device used to extract milk from human breasts

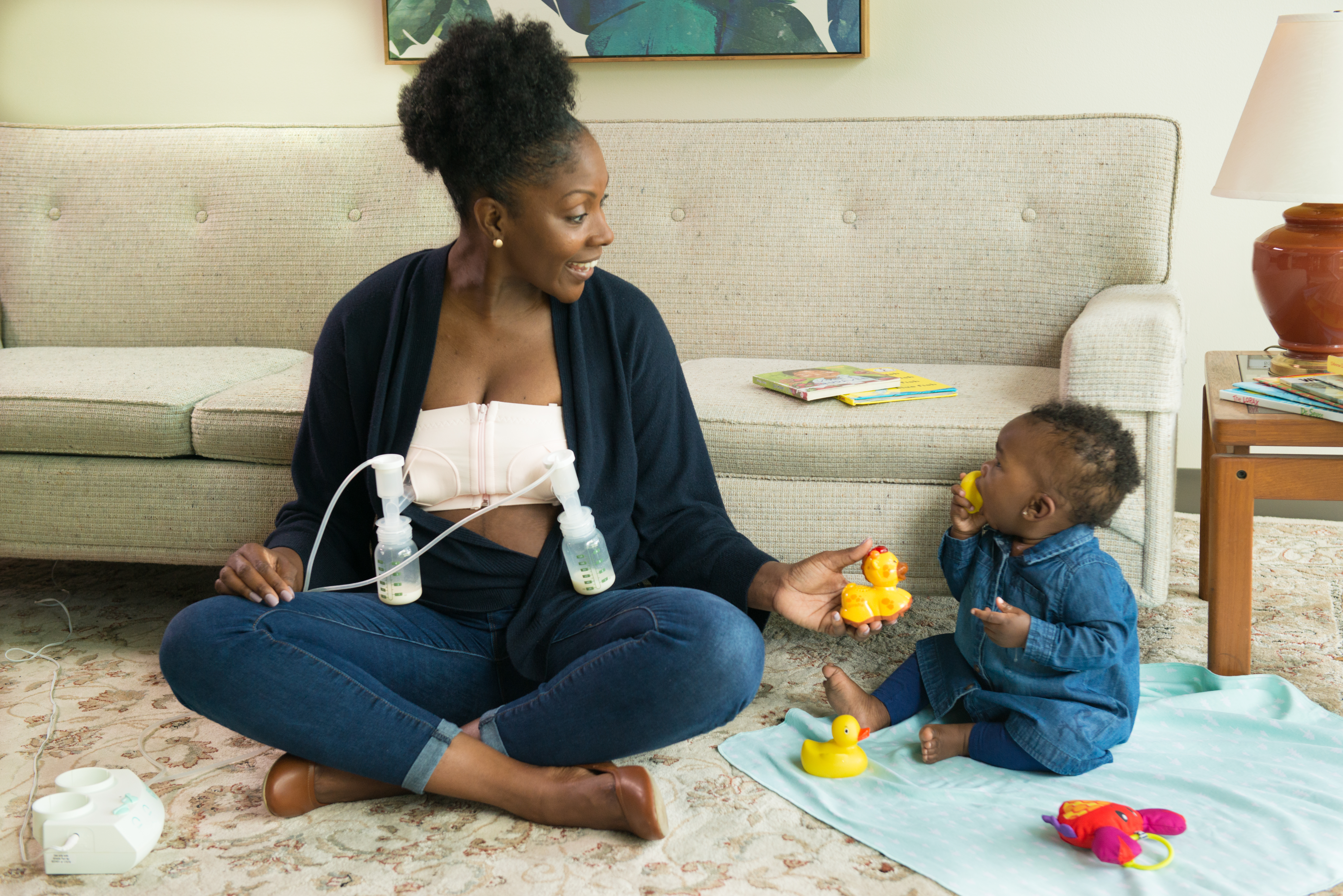
- An electric breast pump in use
- Specialty: Lactation and breastfeeding; milk storage for breastfeeding

External videos
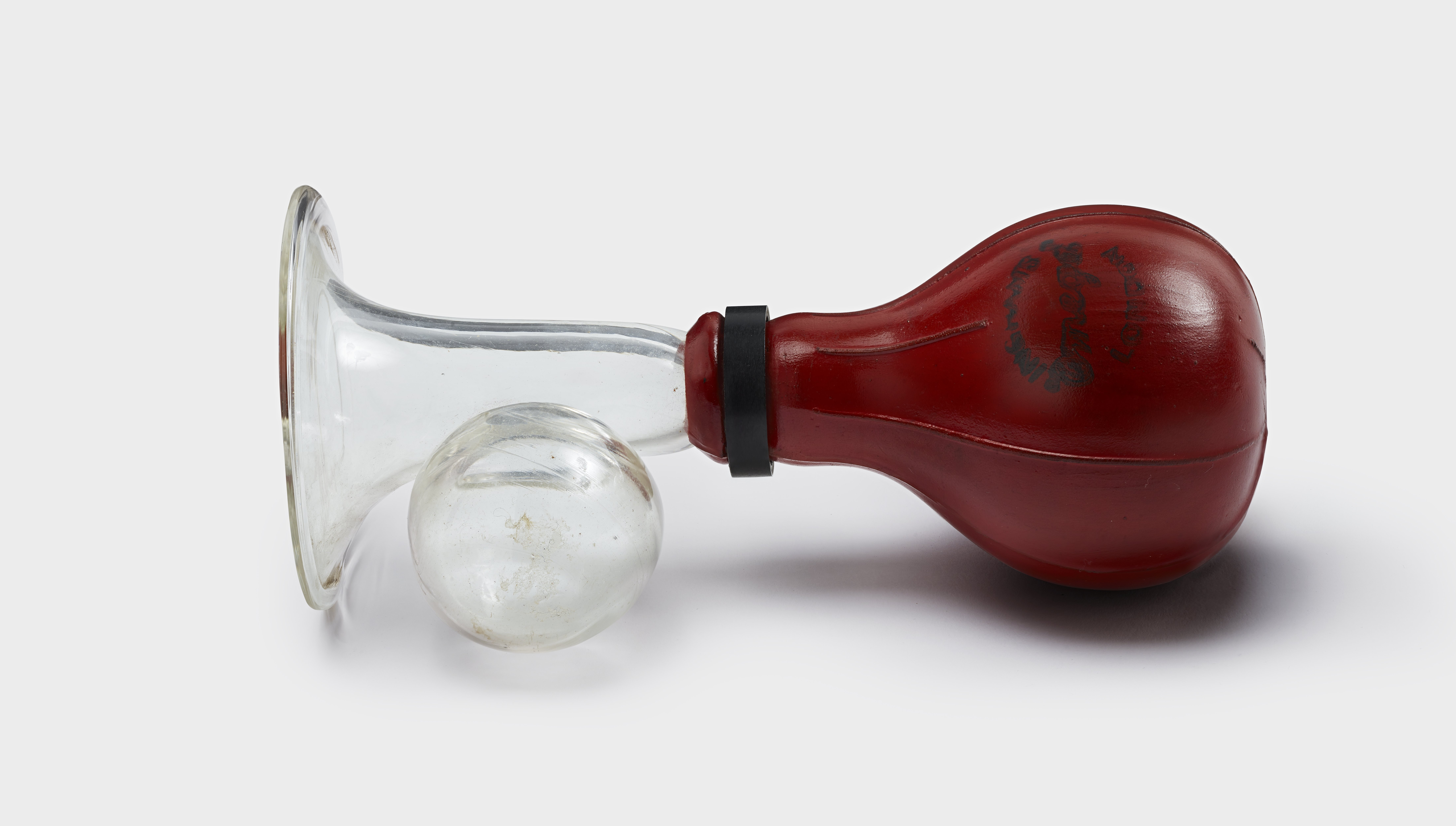
- Distilled #7: Bicycle Horn or Breast Pump?, Distillations Podcast, Science History Institute, January 18, 2019.

A breast pump is a mechanical device that lactating people use to extract milk from their breasts. They may be manual devices powered by hand or foot movements, or automatic devices powered by electricity.

Breast pumps come in several varieties to suit the different needs of mothers. Manual pumps, operated by hand, are portable and quiet, making them suitable for occasional use. Electric pumps, powered by batteries or mains electricity, offer increased efficiency and are often preferred for regular expression. Hospital-grade breast pumps are the most powerful, designed for frequent, heavy-duty use, particularly beneficial for mothers of premature infants or those with lactation challenges. Many modern breast pumps incorporate adjustable suction levels and cycling speeds to mimic a baby's natural feeding patterns, aiming to optimize comfort and milk production for the user.

Breast pumps have been used since antiquity, with evidence suggesting their use in civilizations such as ancient Egypt and Rome. Early methods involved a variety of devices and techniques to express milk.

== History ==
On June 20, 1854, the United States Patent Office issued Patent No. 11,135 to O.H. Needham for a breast pump. Scientific American (1863) credits L.O. Colbin as the inventor and patent applicant of a breast pump. In 1921–23, engineer and chess master Edward Lasker produced a mechanical breast pump that imitated an infant's sucking action and was regarded by physicians as a marked improvement on existing hand-operated breast pumps, which failed to remove all the milk from the breast. The U.S. Patent Office issued U.S. patent 1,644,257 for Lasker's breast pump. In 1956, Einar Egnell published his groundbreaking work, "Viewpoints on what happens mechanically in the female breast during various methods of milk collection". This article provided insight into the technical aspects of milk extraction from the breast. Many Egnell SMB breast pumps designed through this research are still in operation over 50 years after publication.

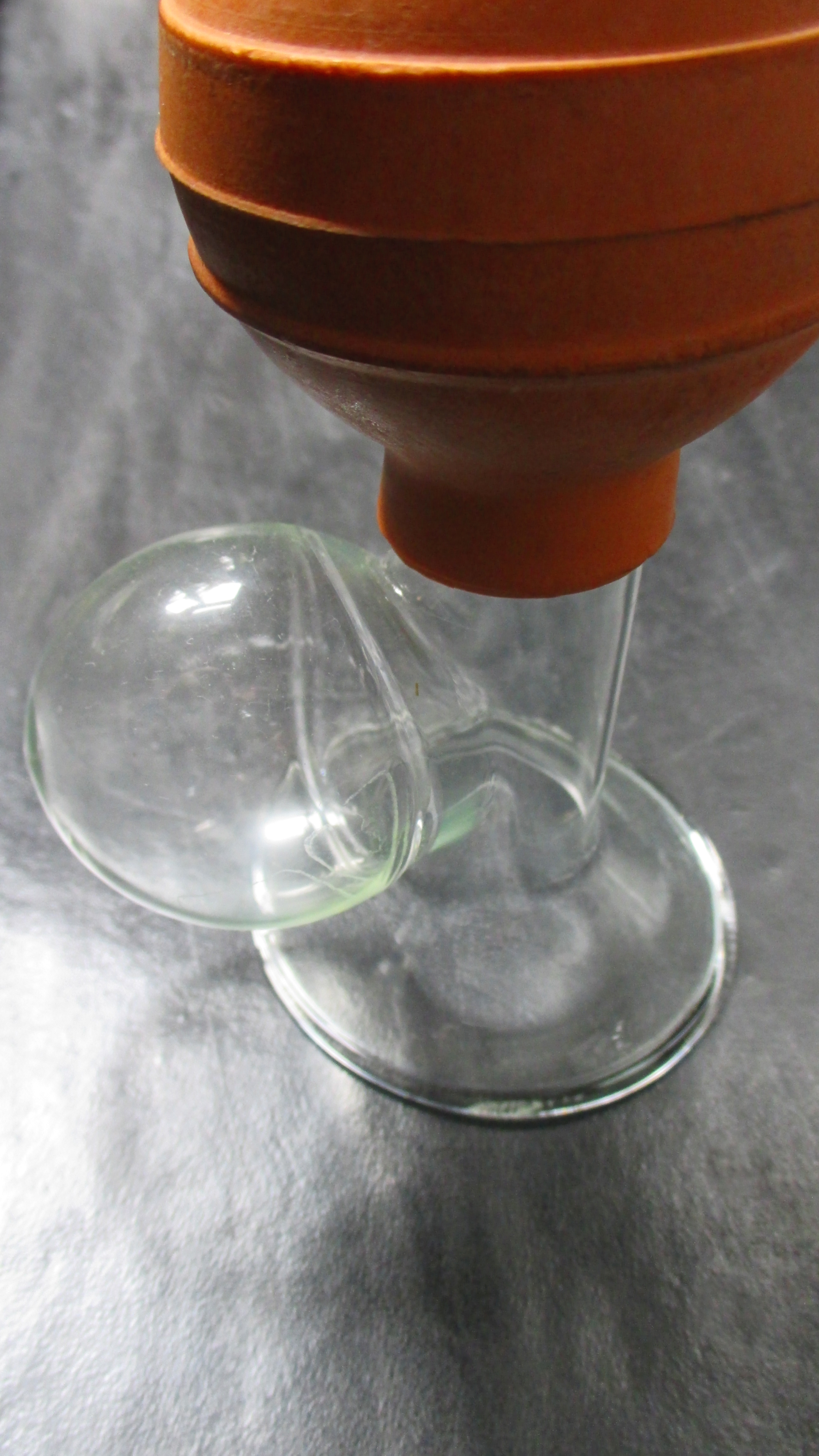
Muttermilch - Saugglocke - DDR - um 1980 - Bild 001

Archaeologists working at a glass factory site in Philadelphia, Pennsylvania, excavated a 19th-century breast pipe that matches breast pumping instruments in period advertisements.

On October 4, 1927, Edward Lasker received a patent for the first electric breast pump.

== Reasons for use ==
Breast pumps are used for many reasons. Many parents use them to continue breastfeeding after they return to work. They express their milk at work, which is later bottle-fed to their child by a caregiver. This use of breast milk is widespread in the United States, where paid family leave is one of the shortest in the developed world. American historian Jill Lepore argues that the need for so-called "lactation rooms" and breast pumps is driven by the corporate desire for parents to return to work immediately rather than mothers' wishes or babies' needs.

A breast pump may be also used to address a range of challenges parents may encounter breast feeding, including difficulties latching, separation from an infant in intensive care, to feed an infant who cannot extract sufficient milk itself from the breast, to avoid passing medication through breast milk to the baby, or to relieve engorgement, a painful condition whereby the breasts are overfull. Pumping may also be desirable to continue lactation and its associated hormones to aid in recovery from pregnancy, even if the pumped milk is not used.

In a 2012 policy statement, the American Academy of Pediatrics recommended feeding preterm infants human milk, finding "significant short- and long-term beneficial effects," including lower rates of necrotizing enterocolitis (NEC). When infants are unable to suckle, mothers can pump if they wish their babies to be fed (via naso-gastric tube) with the mothers' own milk.

Expressing milk for donation is another use for breast pumps. Donor milk may be available from milk banks for babies who are not able to receive their mothers' milk.

"Pump and dump" refers to the practice of disposing of breast milk rather than pumping it to be used. This may be done because the mother produces too much milk, or because the mother will be away from the baby too long without a way to store the milk, or because of concern over alcohol or some other substance that the baby should not have.

== Efficiency and method ==
Research done at Stanford University in 2009 showed the correlation of various factors with the volume of milk production in mothers of preterm babies (born before the 31st week of gestation). The research found that hand expression in addition to a breast pump (a technique called "hands-on pumping", or HOP), along with other factors, correlated to higher milk production. The study found that mothers who used massage techniques and hand expression more than five times a day in the first three days after birth increased their milk production 8 weeks later, and milk production rose by 48%. The authors produced a video showing the technique and state that this technique is good for both mothers of premature infants as well as mothers who return to work or pump for other purposes.

A second article on the same study found that the combination of HOP techniques increased the fat content of the milk expressed.

== Types of modern Breast pump ==
=== Manual ===
Manual breast pumps are operated by squeezing or pulling a handle repetitively, allowing the user to directly control the pressure and frequency of milk expression. Though manual pumps are small and inexpensive, they can require significant effort and can be tiring because the user provides all the power. These pumps may not provide sufficient stimulation and emptying of the breast. "Bicycle-horn" style manual pumps can damage breast tissue and harbor bacteria in the rubber suction bulb, which is difficult to clean.

Foot-powered breast pumps use the same collection tubing and breast horns as electric breast pumps, but are powered by a foot pedal. This eliminates the work of pumping by hand or the need for finding an electrical outlet with privacy.

=== Electric ===
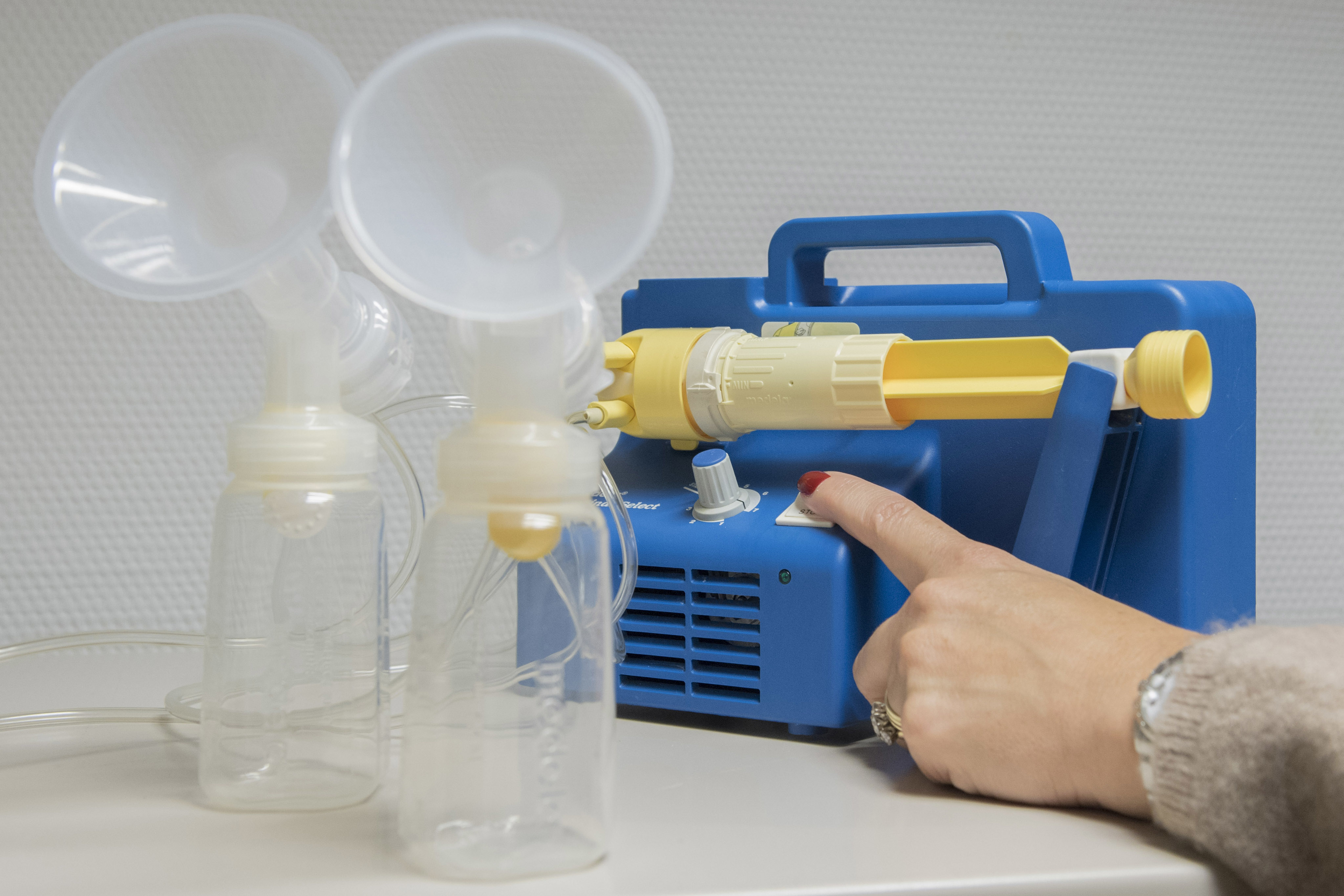
Hospital-grade electric breast pump used for milk expression and storage.

There are two types of electric breast pumps, hospital-grade and personal-use. Hospital-grade pumps are larger and intended for multiple users. Personal-use pumps are generally intended for one user. Electric breast pumps are powered by a motor that supplies suction through plastic tubing to a horn that fits over the nipple. The portions of the pump that come into direct contact with the expressed milk must be sterilized to prevent contamination. This style provides more suction, making pumping significantly faster, and allows users to pump both their breasts at the same time. Electric breast pumps are larger than manual ones, but portable models are available (e.g., in a backpack or shoulder bag). Some models include battery packs or built-in batteries to enable portable operation of the pump. Some electric pumps allow multi-user operation, but recommend an accessory kit for each user to maintain cleanliness.

Rental pumps may be recommended when medical conditions temporarily preclude breastfeeding.

Some breast pumps are designed to be part of a "feeding system" so that the milk storage portion of the pump is the baby bottle used to feed the infant. This allows the milk to be collected in the same bottle that will feed the baby, eliminating the need to transfer breastmilk. Freezable breastmilk storage bags are available that connect directly to some breast pumps and can then be used with disposable bottlefeeding systems.

==== Pressure range and safety ====
Chart showing most valuable mean pressure

Egnell in 1956 established a 220 mmHg safe maximum for automatic cycling pumps; however, there have been reports of sensitive breasts and nipples at much lower pressures. Hartman et al., in a 2008 study, showed that the maximum comfortable vacuum enhances milk flow and milk yield.

== Open collection systems vs. closed collection systems ==
Pump designs are referred to as either open or closed based on whether there is a barrier between where the tubing connects to the pump and where milk flows into the pump. The plastic tubing and horn of an electric breast pump are commonly referred to as the collection system and typically supply the pump's suction.

A closed collection system has a barrier or diaphragm that separates the pump tubing from the horn. In this design, the suction of the pump motor lifts the diaphragm to create a vacuum within the collection system to extract milk.

In contrast, an open system does not have a barrier between the tubing and the horn. Bacterial and viral filters may be present to prevent contamination or overflow into the pump motor. The pump motor's suction is directly passed to the breast versus indirectly, as with closed-diaphragm systems.

Open-collection systems can cause milk to overflow into the collection system tubing, and milk particles can be drawn into the pump motor. If milk leaks into the pump's tubing, the tubes should be washed, sterilized, and air-dried before using the pump again. Failure to thoroughly clean the collection tubing may lead to mould growth within the tubing. Some models of pumps have bacteria and overflow filters that prevent milk from entering the tubing.

A subtype of the open-collection system is the single-user suction source. These pumps have added a hygienic benefit in that all the parts that generate the suction and come in contact with breast milk stay with the mother. The parts that generate the suction are external to the pump and can be removed, preventing cross-contamination. These pumps are considered "hospital grade" and virtually eliminate the chance of cross-contamination of the pump from user to user. However, it is important to clean the diaphragm as condensation or milk reaching this part can cause bacterial contamination.

A disadvantage of the diaphragm is that it may limit the amount of air/suction available to extract milk from the breast. It may also not be able to compensate for larger shield sizes.

There are no studies comparing the open- versus closed-system design. Most information in marketing materials by breast-pump manufacturers is offered without studies to back them up.

== Milk collection and storage ==
Most breast pumps direct the pumped milk into a container that can be used for storage and feeding. Some manufacturers offer adapters to fit a variety of types and sizes of bottles, enabling more flexibility to mix and match products of different brands.

The expressed breast milk (EBM) may be stored and later fed to a baby by bottle. It can either be frozen directly in the bottle, or stored in disposable breast milk bags, which are more compact when frozen, thus saving space in a freezer. Expressed milk may be kept at room temperature for up to six hours (at 66-72 degrees Fahrenheit, around 20 degrees Celsius), in an insulated cooler with ice packs for up to one day, refrigerated at the back of the refrigerator for up to 5 days (optimal: use or freeze the milk within 3 days), or frozen for 12 months in a deep freeze separate from a refrigerator maintained at a temperature of 0 degrees Fahrenheit or −18 degrees Celsius (optimal: use this milk within 6 months). If using frozen milk, the oldest milk should be thawed and used first. Thawing can be done by placing the frozen milk in the refrigerator the night before intended use, or by placing the milk in a bowl of warm water. Breast milk should never be microwaved as this can produce dangerous hot areas and may also destroy the milk's antibodies. Many experts recommend discarding thawed milk that is not used within 24 hours. Breast milk changes to meet a baby's needs, so that breast milk expressed when a baby is a newborn will not completely meet the same baby's needs when he or she is a few months older. Also, storage guidelines might differ for preterm, sick or hospitalized infants.

Expressed milk may be donated to milk banks, which provide human breast milk to premature infants and other children whose mothers cannot provide for them.

== See also ==
- Breastmilk storage and handling
- Lactation suppression
- Milking
- Wet nurse, a woman who feeds a baby who is not her own
