= List of breastfeeding activists =

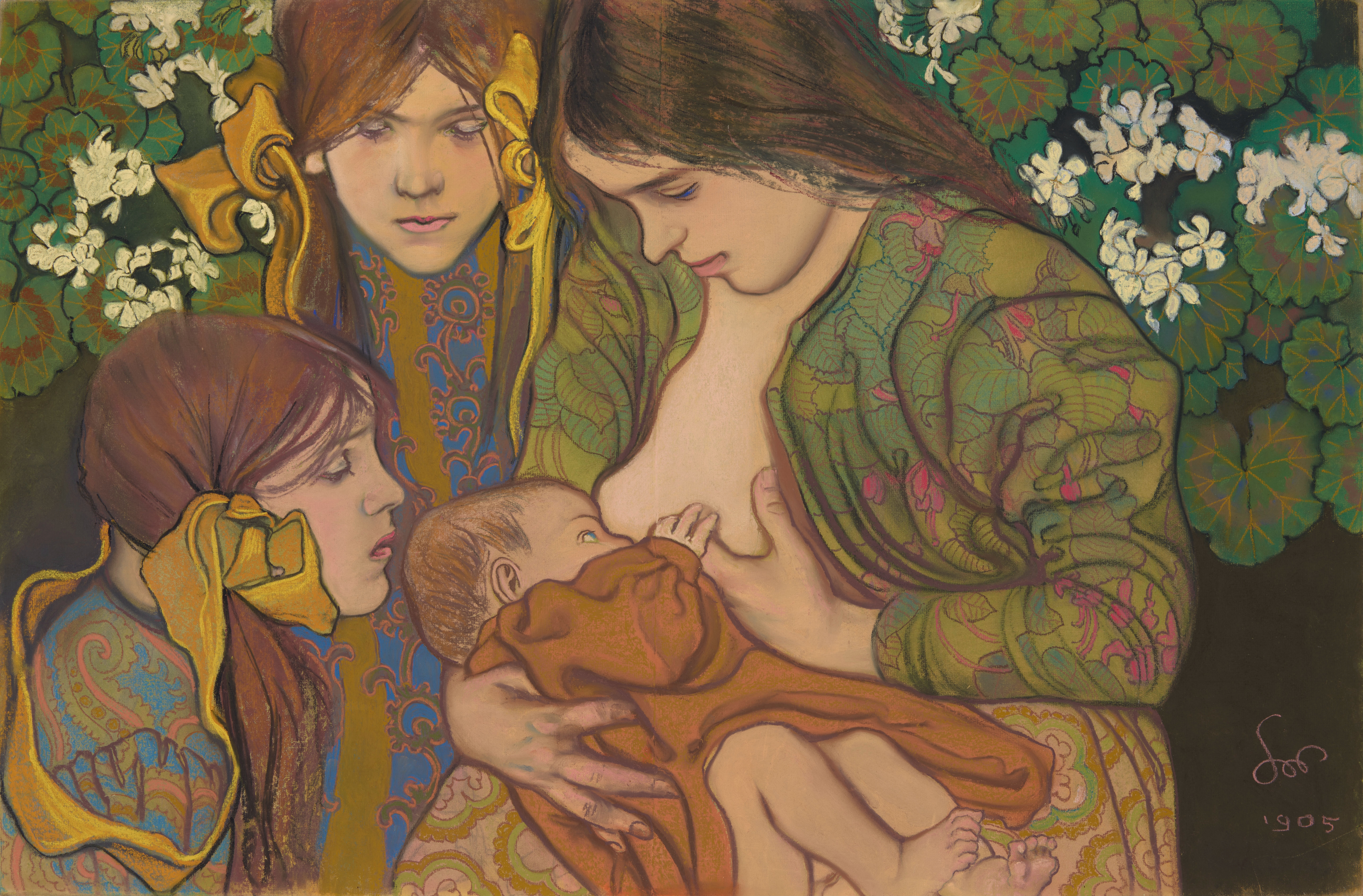
The painting Macierzynstwo by Stanisław Wyspiański

The international breastfeeding community includes people who actively promote breastfeeding, teach breastfeeding, research breastfeeding and related health issues, and who write about breastfeeding and the ways it influences mothering, parenting and family life.

When La Leche League (LLL) was organized in 1956, it became a central place of contact for women looking for information, researchers and health professionals searching for peers, mothers hoping for encouragement and support, and writers wanting to connect with each other and share knowledge and insight.

As breastfeeding women began to join League and attend meetings they also became a willing market for publications about nursing and parenting. La Leche League conferences (local, national and international) created venues for speakers, for researchers to present their findings, and for new books to be released. As more women became college educated and entered the work force, they began to create new health fields, such as lactation consultation. Today, there are lactivists, women and men who actively promote the health benefits of breastfeeding for mothers, babies and communities, and who protest companies and corporations who discriminate against breastfeeding women.

With the development of the internet, individual women can share their breastfeeding experiences, sites can be created that address medical issues, research can be shared throughout the world, and governments can promote breastfeeding as a tool to improve the general health of their entire populations.

This list starts small, with the names of the founders of La Leche League, and then links to articles about the most well-known writers and researchers in the field of breastfeeding today. It includes the most authoritative sites with breastfeeding information, and some smaller sites that address important aspects of breastfeeding. The world health community encourages breastfeeding with sites aimed at a national and international audience.

== The founders of La Leche League ==
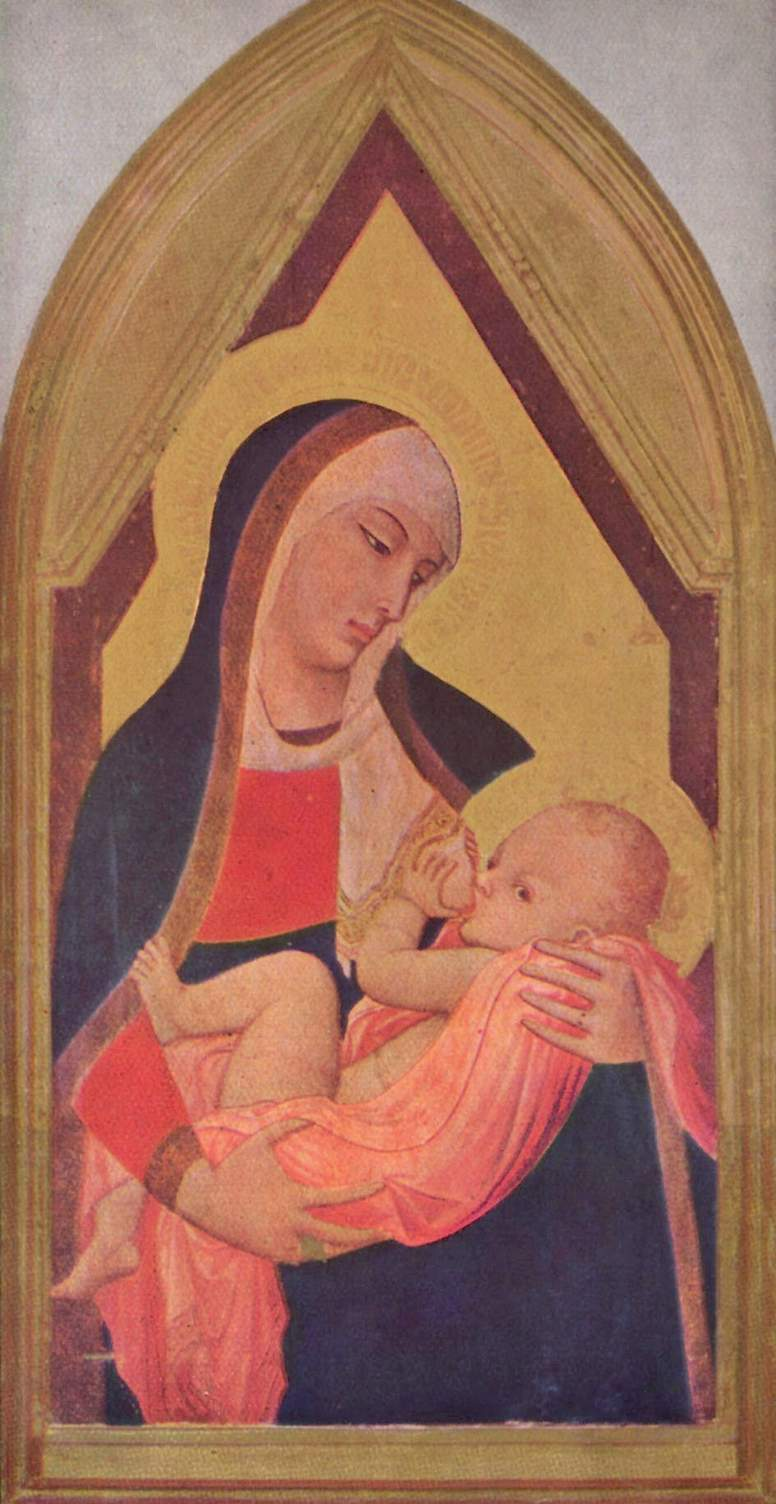
The painting Madonna del Latte by Ambrogio Lorenzetti

These are the founders of La Leche League, also known as the founding mothers:

- Mary Ann Cahill
- Edwina Froehlich
- Mary Ann Kerwin
- Viola Lennon
- Marian Tompson
- Betty Wagner
- Mary White

Very early supporters of La Leche League, as listed in the Second Edition of the Womanly Art of Breastfeeding, May 1963, include:

- Dr. Herbert Ratner, Dr. Gregory J. White, Dr. Niles Newton, Dr. E. Robbins Kimball
- Dr. Frank Howard Richardson, Dr. Grantly Dick-Read, Mrs. John Gale Aiken
- Ms Mildred Hatch, Mrs. Margaret Gamper R.N., Ms Joy Sidor, Ms Dorothy Vining
- Ms Mary B. Carson

== Medical professionals working in the field today ==
International Breastfeeding Symbol

- Katherine Ann Dettwyler, former Adjunct Associate Anthropology Professor at the University of Delaware. She has been a lecturer, author and breastfeeding advocate. She wrote some of the first internet pages: Thoughts on Breastfeeding.
- Lawrence Gartner, professor emeritus, Departments of Pediatrics and Obstetrics/Gynecology University of Chicago, lead author of current American Academy of Pediatrics statement of Breastfeeding and the use of human milk
- Thomas W. Hale, R.Ph., Ph.D. Professor of Pediatrics, Texas Tech University School of Medicine Author of Medications and Mother's Milk
- Barbara Heiser, RN, BSN, IBCLC, executive director of the National Alliance for Breastfeeding Advocacy
- Sheila Kitzinger, taught workshops on the social anthropology of birth and breastfeeding
- Chris Mulford, RN, LLL Leader, IBCLC.
- Dr. Jack Newman, MD, Canadian physician specializing in breastfeeding support and advocacy
- Dr. William Sears, American pediatrician and the author or co-author of more than 30 parenting books with his wife, Martha, who is also a La Leche League Leader. They write and lecture about attachment parenting, and coined the phrase.
- Amy Spangler, American MN, RN and IBCLC who lectures extensively on the benefits of breastfeeding and has written several books on the nursing-related subjects.
- Pat Shelly, IBCLC, RNC, MA, Director of the Breastfeeding Center for Greater Washington.

== Prominent authors on breastfeeding-related topics ==
- Diana West, IBCLC, writer and lecturer on breastfeeding issues

== Publications and organizations that actively support breastfeeding ==
- Mothering – a holistic parenting magazine edited by Peggy O'Mara, a breastfeeding advocate
- La Leche League

== Writings on politics and breastfeeding ==
- The Politics of Breastfeeding — When Breasts Are Bad for Business by Gabrielle Palmer first published in 1988 and never out of print since
- Lactivism: How Feminists and Fundamentalists, Hippies and Yuppies, and Physicians and Politicians Made Breastfeeding Big Business and Bad Policy by Courtney Jung 2015
- Unlatched: The Evolution of Breastfeeding and the Making of a Controversy by Jennifer Grayson 2016
- Mother's Milk: Breastfeeding Controversies in American Culture by Bernice Hausman
- Milk, Money, and Madness: the culture and politics of breastfeeding by Naomi Baumslang & Dia Michels 2008
- Breastfeeding: Biocultural Perspectives by Patricia Stuart-Macadam & Katherine Dettwyler 1995
- The Big Letdown: How Medicine, Big Business, and Feminism Undermine Breastfeeding by Kimberly Seals Allers 2017
