= Kerwin House =

Kerwin House may refer to:

- Cranmer House (Denver, Colorado), also known as Kerwin House, listed on the National Register of Historic Places (NRHP)
- Judge J. C. Kerwin House, Neenah, Wisconsin, also NRHP-listed
