= Diana West (lactation consultant) =

American lactation consultant (born 1965)

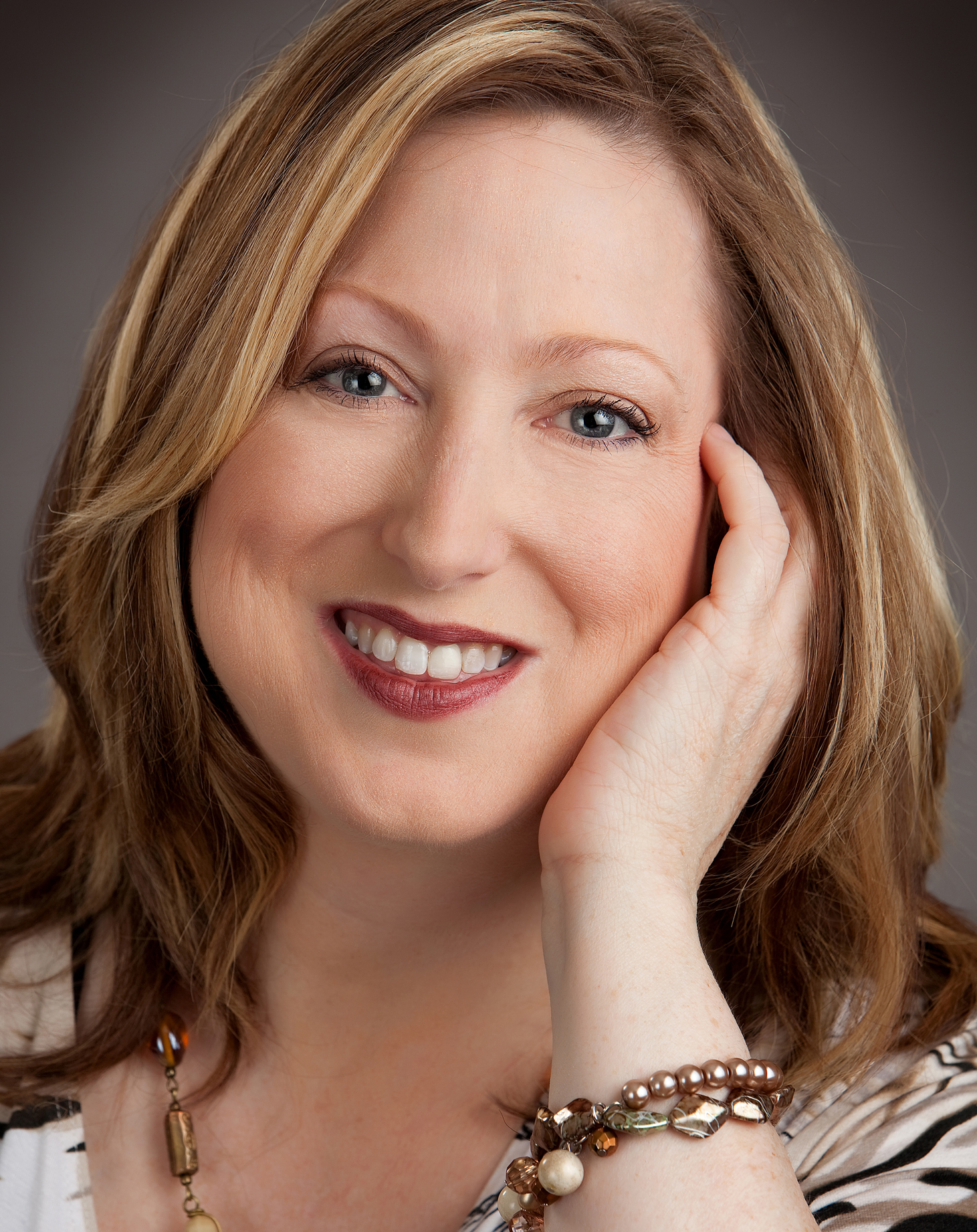
- Born: August 8, 1965 (age 61); Rogers, Arkansas
- Education: University of Maryland, Baltimore County
- Occupations: lactation consultant, author
- Years active: 2002–present
- Known for: breastfeeding activist
- Notable work: The Clinician's Breastfeeding Triage Tool

Diana West (born August 8, 1965) is a leading lactation consultant and author specializing on the topic of breastfeeding.

== Biography ==
Diana West was born August 8, 1965, in Rogers, Arkansas. West is the granddaughter of Clyde T. Ellis (1908–1980), congressman of Arkansas (1939–1943) and the first general manager (CEO) of the National Rural Electric Cooperative Association (1943–1967).

West attended the University of Maryland, Baltimore County, from which she obtained a Bachelor of Arts degree in industrial psychology. She became an International Board Certified Lactation Consultant (IBCLC) in 2002 and opened her private lactation consultation practice later the same year. West has published five books about breastfeeding. She lives in the Long Valley section of Washington Township, Morris County, New Jersey, with her three sons.

== Work in the lactation field ==
West became involved in breastfeeding advocacy after her experiences trying to breastfeed her three children following breast reduction surgery.

West is an accredited La Leche League Leader and has worked for La Leche League International as their Director of Media Relations since 2011. She was a member of the review board of the United States Lactation Consultant Association (USLCA) professional journal Clinical Lactation from May 2014 until October 2016. She was a member of the board of directors of the International Lactation Consultant Association (ILCA) from July 2008 until the end of 2009, working as Director of Professional Development. She has been on the board of the Monetary Investment for Lactation Consultant Certification (MILCC) and has been a speaker at many professional and parenting conferences.

Alongsider her private lactation consultation practice, West is a clinical lactation forms developer, a website developer, and administrator of both the Breastfeeding After Breast and Nipple Surgeries and the Low Milk Supply websites.

== Published works ==
In her 2001 book, Defining Your Own Success: Breastfeeding After Breast Reduction Surgery, West discusses the effects of breast reduction surgery on breastfeeding and provides practical advice to women in that situation. The Journal of Human Lactation described this book as "an excellent resource for healthcare professionals, in particular lactation consultants."

West led a team of international lactation professionals in developing The Clinician's Breastfeeding Triage Tool for the International Lactation Consultant Association in 2007, which was revised in 2008 and 2014. This health care tool provided evidence-based information for first-line treatment of lactation dysfunction and pathologies.

In her 2008 monograph with Dr. Elliot Hirsch, Clinics in Human Lactation: Breastfeeding After Breast and Nipple Procedures, West and Hirsch examined the effects of breast and nipple procedures on lactation for medical professionals.

In her 2008 book with Lisa Marasco about low milk production, The Breastfeeding Mother's Guide to Making More Milk, West and Marasco presented methods to identify the causes of low milk production and targeted strategies to increase them, including more effective milk removal, addressing hormonal dysfunction, and the use of galactagogues (herbs to increase lactation), such as goat's rue and shatavari.

In her 2010 book with Diane Wiessinger and Teresa Pitman for La Leche League International, The Womanly Art of Breastfeeding, 8th edition, Wiessinger, West, and Pitman re-wrote La Leche League International's landmark book about breastfeeding for the new millennial generation.

In her 2014 book with Diane Wiessinger, Linda J. Smith, and Teresa Pitman for La Leche League International, Sweet Sleep: Nighttime and Naptime Strategies for the Breastfeeding Family, Wiessinger, West, Smith, and Pitman examined the risks and safety of bedsharing for breastfeeding mothers as a strategy to improve breastfeeding outcomes, and provided strategies to make bedsharing safer and easier.

== LGBTQ lactation research ==
In 2014, West was instrumental in revising La Leche League's leadership eligibility criteria to allow leaders to serve no matter their gender, following their initial rejection of Trevor MacDonald, a transgender father. West commented, “It was thought that only women could breastfeed. Once it became clear it wasn’t as straightforward as that, the policy had to change. We’re just trying to be on the right side of history. Yes, we took a year to do it, but we did it in a way that was fair and unequivocal.”

West went on to be part of a research team with MacDonald through the University of Ottawa that conducted qualitative research about transmasculine individuals' experiences of pregnancy, birthing, and feeding their newborns. The group's research paper, "Transmasculine individuals’ experiences with lactation, chestfeeding, and gender identity: a qualitative study," contains the first known use of the word "chestfeeding" in the title of an academic paper, which is a term preferred by some transmasculine individuals to describe their lactation and nursing relationship. The paper is in the top 1% of the most-viewed academic research papers of all time.

== Works ==
- Defining Your Own Success: Breastfeeding After Breast Reduction Surgery, La Leche League International, 2001.
- Clinician's Breastfeeding Triage Tool, International Lactation Consultant Association, 2007–2014 (Editions 1–3).
- Clinics in Human Lactation: Breastfeeding After Breast and Nipple Procedures, A Guide for Healthcare Professionals, Hale Publishing, 2008, with Elliot M. Hirsch.
- The Breastfeeding Mother's Guide to Making More Milk,, McGraw-Hill, 2008, with Lisa Marasco.
- The Womanly Art of Breastfeeding, 8th edition, Ballantine Books, 2010, with Diane Wiessinger and Teresa Pitman.
- Sweet Sleep: Nighttime and Naptime Strategies for the Breastfeeding Family, Ballantine Books, 2014, with Diane Wiessinger, Linda J. Smith, and Teresa Pitman.

== See also ==
- List of breastfeeding activists
