= Sad nipple syndrome =

Anecdotal medical condition

Sad nipple syndrome (SNS) is a condition in which people (or women in particular) experience dysphoria – deep unease, sadness or unhappiness – on light stimulation of their nipples, such as when changing clothes, drying their chest with a towel, or during sex. It generally resolves within minutes, but leaves those affected confused and disturbed.

SNS is not a recognized medical condition, there is very little research into it, and evidence for it is anecdotal, although the condition "perhaps ... is fairly common". The term "sad nipple syndrome" emerged from social media discussions among those affected, Heise had reported its use in 2011. Kitaoka and Tateoka in 2025 distinguished SNS from dysphoric milk ejection reflex (D-MER), with SNS defined as a syndrome occurring outside of breastfeeding and found SNS to occur in about 12% of women in their survey.

As of 2026, increasing attention is paid to SNS by medical practitioners. Gynaecologists interviewed by The Guardian expressed the assumption that the condition is in some way related to the endocrine system, particularly the pathways for the hormones oxytocin, prolactin and dopamine. This is also the case in the better-studied and similar conditions, D-MER and post-coital dysphoria, in which the dysphoria is a result of breastfeeding or orgasm, respectively.

== Sources ==
- Heise, Alia M.; Wiessinger, Diane (2011). "Dysphoric milk ejection reflex: A case report". International Breastfeeding Journal. 6. Article 6. doi:10.1186/1746-4358-6-6. PMC 3126760. PMID 21645333.
- Kitaoka, Nao; Tateoka, Yumiko (2025). "乳頭刺激に関連した不快症状（Dysphoric milk ejection reflex；D-MER・Sad Nipple Syndrome；SNS）を経験する女性のメンタルヘルスへの影響" [Impact on the mental health of women experiencing discomfort associated with nipple stimulation (D-MER/SNS)] (PDF). 第21回日本周産期メンタルヘルス学会学術集会プログラム・抄録集 (in Japanese). p. 81. Poster P-32.
