= Lucina Kathmann =

American writer and activist

- Born: Albany, New York
- Education: Harvard University and Northwestern University
- Occupations: Writer and activist
- Spouse: Charles Kuschinski (1942-1996)
- Writing career
- Notable works: Payshapes and the Bear

Lucina Kathmann (1942–present) is an American writer and activist. She has published books, essays, and short stories internationally in multiple languages. She has been an active member of PEN International since 1986 and helped found the organization's Women Writers Committee in 1991. Lucina represents PEN International at the United Nations Commission on the Status of Women.

== Early life ==
Kathmann was born to a pair of physicians. Kathmann earned her BA in philosophy from Harvard University in 1964 and an MA from Northwestern University in 1967.

== Career ==
She taught philosophy at Barat College for a few years. Kathmann's writing is mainly about women, their struggles and accomplishments, their suppression and their extraordinary contributions to freedom and to literature. In 1989, her novel, The Adventures of the Magnificent Kong and Brawny Mouse was published by Liberty Press and later came out on special tapes for the blind.

Moving forward, she wrote a lot of her own pieces in English and Spanish. Throughout the nineties, Kathmann published essays, poetry, translations and children's stories in a variety of magazines, anthologies, and other venues." A bilingual anthology of her children’s stories, Payshapes and the Bear, was published in 1999, which was recognized as a finalist in the International Book Awards, sponsored by USA Book News.

== Selected bibliography ==
=== Books ===
- The Adventure of the Magnificent Kong and Brawny Mouse, 1988
- Payshapes and the Bear, Chiron Books, (English/Spanish)
- To Make Ourselves Heard/Para que nos escuchen : historias del Comité de Escritos del, Biblioteca de Textos Universitarios, 2002
- A Forest of Mathematics, Chiron Books, 2008
- Private Spaces, Public Places: a woman at home in the world, Madeira Press, 2017

=== Essays ===
- “The Woman Who Knows Latin (Inglés)” Cordite Poetry Review (2004)
- “Mujer que sabe latín (Español)” Cordite Poetry Review (2004)
- “Destination Kurdistan” Cordite Poetry Review (2005)
- “Guest-Blogger Lucina Kathmann, Author of a Forest of Mathematics / Un bosque de matemáticas” Madam Mayo (2009)
- “Battlefront Mexico” PEN International (2012)
- “Murder by Another Name” PEN International (2013)
- “A History of the PEN International Women Writers Committee” PEN International Women Writers Committee Then and Now (2013)
- “China: PIWCC writes to Xi Jinping on recent ‘wave of arrests’” PEN International (2014)
- “First Day of CSW 63 United Nations New York NY 11 March 2019” Chicago Network for Justice & Peace (2019)
- “United Nations Commission on the Status of Women 63 Second Day – 12 March 2019” Chicago Network for Justice & Peace (2019)
- “A Report on the 62th Session of the UN Commission on the Status of Women” Chicago Network for Justice & Peace (2018)
- “United Nations Commission on the Status of Women 14 March 2019 CSW Day 4” Chicago Network for Justice & Peace (2019)
- “Double Danger: Woman & Journalist” Chicago Network for Justice & Peace (2019)
- “Ženske morajo prenašati več težav / Women have to endure more problems” Vrabec Anarhist (2020)
- “A dangerous place in a dangerous country: an interview with Fernanda Ferral” PEN International (2020)
