= Mary Ann Kerwin =

American lawyer (born 1931)

- Born: Mary Ann Collins; 1931 (age 94–95); Wisconsin, U.S.
- Education: B.A. English literature, Barat College of the Sacred Heart, 1953; J.D., University of Denver, 1986
- Occupations: Lawyer, breastfeeding activist
- Years active: 1956–present
- Known for: Co-founder of La Leche League
- Spouse: Thomas Joseph Kerwin
- Children: 6 sons (one died in infancy); 3 daughters
- Awards: Colorado Women's Hall of Fame, 2012

Mary Ann Kerwin (born 1931) is an American lawyer and breastfeeding activist. One of the seven founders of La Leche League in 1956, she established the Colorado branch of the advocacy group and drafted state laws on behalf of women who breastfeed their infants in public and in the workplace. She was inducted into the Colorado Women's Hall of Fame in 2012.

== Early life, education, and marriage ==
Mary Ann Collins was born in Wisconsin in 1931 and moved to the Chicago area as a child. She earned her B.A. in English literature, minoring in education, at Barat College of the Sacred Heart, a Roman Catholic college in Lake Forest, Illinois, in 1953.

After graduation she took some teaching jobs; later she worked as a travel agent. In December 1954, she married Thomas Joseph Kerwin (1930–2008), a graduate of Loyola University. They had six sons, one of whom died in infancy, and three daughters.

== La Leche League ==
We would practically smother our babies with blankets to avoid showing any breast. At that time, it was seen as a shameful act, which has since changed.

— Mary Ann Kerwin

In 1956 Kerwin's sister-in-law, Mary White, invited her to the inaugural meeting of La Leche League at White's home. The idea for a breastfeeding advocacy organization was developed by White and Marian Tompson while they breastfed their infants at a church picnic in summer 1956. At the time, American mothers interested in natural childbirth and breastfeeding received little support from the medical community. In the US, only one in five newborns were breastfed from birth; most were immediately fed from bottles. Other women approached the two to discuss their experiences breastfeeding their infants and the discouragement they had received from pediatricians. White and Thompson decided to start a breastfeeding advocacy group and invited a few women, who invited their acquaintances; the seven founders were White, Tompson, Kerwin, Edwina Froehlich, Viola Lennon, Mary Ann Cahill, and Betty Wagner, all Catholic mothers. Kerwin, expecting her second child at the time, had received help from White and her husband, Dr. Gregory White, a family doctor, to successfully breastfeed her first baby.

The women held several meetings at White's house in Franklin Park, Illinois, to discuss the type of information and support breastfeeding mothers would need. They held their first official meeting on October 17, 1956 at White's house, attended by the seven founders and five of their acquaintances who were expecting. Their second meeting drew 30 attendees, and the fourth attracted a standing-room-only audience. The women developed a series of monthly educational meetings, and near the end of the decade began publishing informational material. In 1958 Kerwin co-authored the group's first handbook, The Womanly Art of Breastfeeding.

In 1960 the Kerwins moved to Denver, where they purchased the Cranmer House, residing there for three decades. Kerwin founded the Colorado chapter of La Leche League and also served as chair of the international board.

== Legal career ==
In 1986 Kerwin earned her J.D. at the University of Denver. She practiced family law and general litigation until retiring.

As the Colorado Breast-feeding Task Force Legislation Representative for the Colorado Breast-feeding Coalition, Kerwin drafted several pieces of legislation on behalf of nursing women. The two that were passed into law were the 2004 Breastfeeding in Public Act and the 2008 Nursing Mothers' Act for Workplace Accommodation. In 2006 Kerwin withdrew her draft legislation aimed at protecting a woman's right to pump breast milk in the workplace due to lack of support from the governor.

== Awards and honors ==
Kerwin was inducted into the Colorado Women's Hall of Fame in 2012.

== References and sources ==
Sources

- Idler, Ellen (2014), "Ingenious Institutions: Religious Origins of Health and Development Organizations", in Idler, Ellen (ed.), Religion as a Social Determinant of Public Health, Oxford University Press, ISBN 978-0199389865
- Ward, Jule DeJager (2000). La Leche League: At the Crossroads of Medicine, Feminism, and Religion. UNC Press Books. ISBN 978-0807847916.
