= Hand expression of breast milk =

Hand expression of breast milk is a technique used by lactating mothers to express breast milk using their hands. It is an ancient practice that has been used by women across the world for centuries. Hand expression has gained renewed interest in recent years due to its affordability, portability, and effectiveness. It is an important tool for breastfeeding mothers, especially those who are unable to afford or access breast pumps.

While hand expression is a basic process, it does require proper technique and education. Mothers need to be informed about the correct method of hand expression, the benefits of hand expression, and the potential challenges they may face. These challenges can include difficulties with hand fatigue, insufficient milk supply, and a lack of privacy or support. However, with the right resources and support, hand expression can be an effective method for mothers to provide breast milk for their infants.

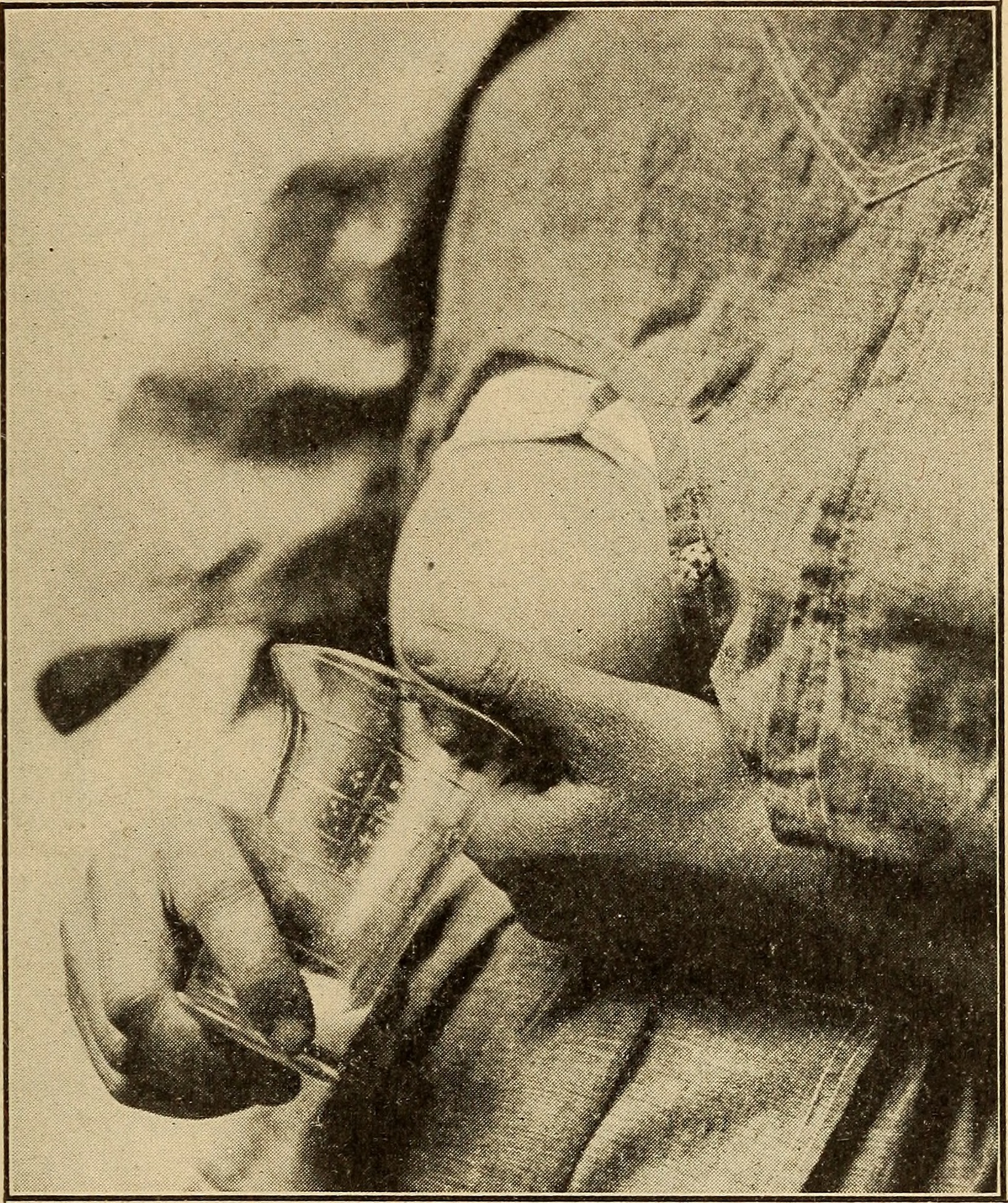
Showing the left thumb gently grasping the upper part of the breast about one inch behind the nipple. The thumb of the left hand gently compresses the breast against the side of the glass with a gentle sweeping movement

== Overview ==
Hand expression of breast milk is the process of using one's hand to remove milk from the breast. It is a useful skill for lactating women to have as it can help relieve engorgement, maintain milk supply, and provide breast milk to a baby in the absence of a breast pump. Hand expression can be done anywhere, anytime and without any special equipment. It is also an inexpensive and efficient way to collect breast milk, especially when a breast pump is not available or is not working effectively.

== Technique ==
To hand express breast milk, the lactating woman should begin by washing her hands and finding a comfortable, private space. She should then gently massage her breast with her hands or a warm compress to encourage the flow of milk.The woman should place her thumb and index finger around the breast tissue, just behind the areola. Using a rolling motion with the fingers, she should compress the milk ducts and express the milk into a clean container. This process should be repeated several times on each breast, switching sides as needed. The Marmet technique is one commonly taught method of hand expression. It combines breast massage, compression, and rhythmic expression to stimulate milk removal.

Hand expression can take some practice to master, and women may need to experiment with different techniques to find what works best for them. Some women may find that hand expression is more comfortable and effective than using a breast pump, while others may prefer to use a pump.

== Advantages and benefits ==
There are several advantages and benefits of hand expression of breast milk. Firstly, it can be done at any time and in any location, without the need for special equipment. Secondly, it is a free and convenient way for women to collect their milk. Thirdly, hand expression can be helpful for women who have engorged breasts or clogged milk ducts, as it can provide relief and help stimulate milk flow. Lastly, hand expression can be a useful technique for women who have premature or ill babies who are unable to breastfeed.

== Challenges of hand expression of breast milk ==
Hand expression can be a challenging technique, and many women may face difficulties when trying to express milk by hand. One of the main challenges is the time and effort required to express enough milk to meet the baby's needs. Research has shown that it takes longer to express milk by hand compared to using an electric breast pump, and some women may not have the time or energy to spend on hand expression.

Another challenge is the risk of contamination, which can lead to infections in both the mother and the baby. If the hands or the equipment used for hand expression are not properly cleaned and sterilized, bacteria can enter the milk and cause infections.To minimize the risk of contamination, it is recommended that mothers wash their hands thoroughly before expressing milk and use clean containers for storing the milk.

In addition, some women may experience discomfort or pain during hand expression, especially if they have engorged breasts or sore nipples.

Overall, while hand expression can be a useful technique for breastfeeding mothers, it is important to be aware of the challenges and potential risks involved, and to seek support and guidance from healthcare professionals if needed.

== Support ==
Mothers who are interested in learning more about hand expression can seek support from lactation consultants, peer support groups, or online resources. The World Health Organization recommends that health workers teach mothers how to hand express in situations where a breast pump is not available or appropriate. The La Leche League International also provides information and support for mothers who are interested in hand expression.

== Safety ==
Hand expression is a safe and natural way to extract breast milk. However, it is important to practice good hygiene by washing hands and using clean containers to collect the milk. Mothers who have any concerns about their milk supply, their baby's feeding patterns, or any other breastfeeding-related issues should consult with a healthcare provider or a lactation consultant.

=== Global health importance ===
In low-resource settings, hand expression remains particularly important because breast pumps may be unavailable, expensive, or difficult to maintain. Teaching hand expression is therefore included in many maternal and newborn health programs.
