= Yaoi hole =

Concept in homoerotic fiction

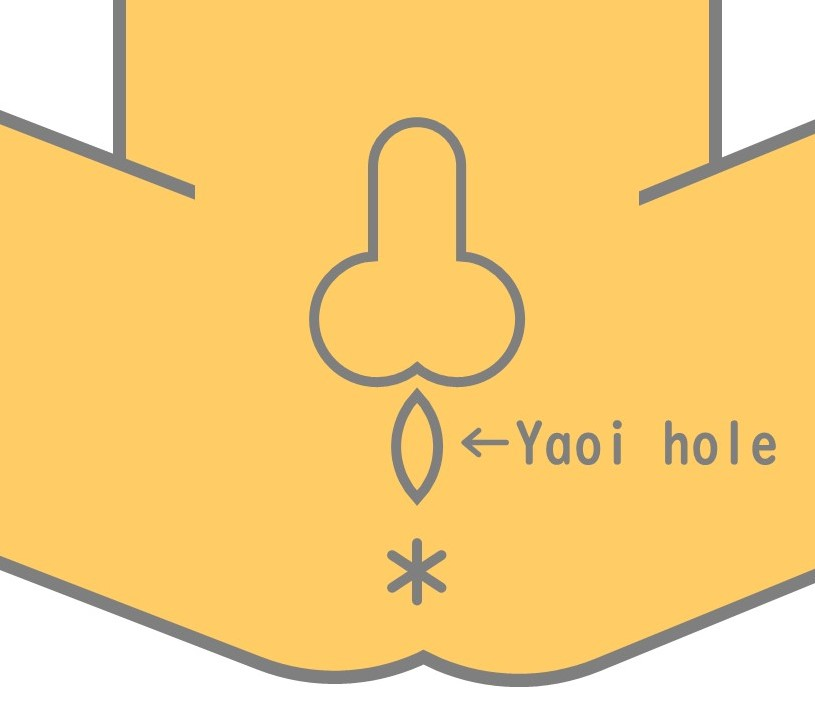
An illustration of a yaoi hole, supposing the existence of a third sexual organ between the penis and anus

The yaoi hole (Japanese: やおい穴, romanized: yaoi-ana) is a concept in yaoi, a genre of fictional media depicting homoerotic relations between men aimed at a female audience, that supposes the existence of a male sexual organ that is neither a penis nor an anus. The concept arose from depictions of anal sex in some yaoi works that appeared to defy typical anatomy and physiology, such as representations of penetrative sex in positions that do not correspond to the location of the receiving partner's anus. The yaoi hole as a phenomenon has been alternately considered as reflecting a lack of understanding about male anatomy and anal sex possessed by the (mostly female and heterosexual) writers of early yaoi, and as an intentional exaggeration reflecting a desire for fantasy over realism in pornographic fiction narratives.

== Context and etymology ==
Anal sex appears frequently as a subject in yaoi, (Note: Also known as "boys' love" (ボーイズ ラブ, bōizu rabu) and its abbreviation "BL" (ビーエル, bīeru)) a genre of manga, novels, and other fictional media created by and for a female audience that depict homoerotic relationships between men. However, sexual acts and sex organs in early yaoi works were often rendered inaccurately: the sexual positions in which the male subjects were joined in penetrative sex seemingly did not correspond to the correct location of the receptive partner's anus, or the receptive partner would self-lubricate in a manner atypical of an anus. These representations were initially criticized as reflecting an ignorance of the mechanics of anal sex on the part of yaoi authors, and derisively suggested to imply the existence of a distinct sexual organ that would come to be referred to as the "yaoi hole". Some authors embraced the concept of the yaoi hole in response, and began to either jokingly or earnestly depict it in their works.

The yaoi hole has been described as a "third sexual organ" that is neither feminine nor masculine. Though there is little agreement over the precise structure of the yaoi hole, its existence in yaoi fiction is widely acknowledged by fans of yaoi. Ayako Shiramine, a former librarian at the Yoshihiro Yonezawa Memorial Library, analyzed 51 yaoi works and concluded that the orifices depicted "do not seem to be an anus", as there were not definite descriptions of the orifice being an anus and it did not function like one, and concluded that the yaoi hole is a separate entity from the anus.

The origin of the term "yaoi hole" to describe this phenomenon is unknown, though sociologist and yaoi doujinshi researcher Junko Kaneda speculates that it may have arisen around the year 2000 in yaoi fan communities on the Internet.

== Characteristics ==
The yaoi hole is associated with depictions of anal sex in yaoi that would seem to defy typical anatomy and physiology. This includes as depictions of sex in the missionary position where the passive partner's legs are laid flat and not spread eagle, appendages and objects being easily inserted into the receptive partner without the use of personal lubricant, the absence of preparation for anal sex (through activities such as rectal douching), and in some stories, the inclusion of male pregnancy and childbirth.

Often the passive partner in yaoi is described as being "wet" with liquid of an unknown origin, a device referred to colloquially by yaoi fans as "yaoi juice" (やおい汁, yaoi-jiru). Yaoi juice functions as a form of self-lubrication, as similar to vaginal lubrication. Chill Chill considered the hypothesis that yaoi juice was intestinal fluid, but concluded that intestinal fluid lacks the necessary viscosity, lubricity, and quantity to be used as lubricant.

Involuntary movement of the receptive partner's orifice, such as twitching or tightening, also occurs in yaoi hole stories. Ayako Shiramine, a former librarian at the Yoshihiro Yonezawa Memorial Library, considers that this kind of depiction may be used to communicate pleasure on the part of the receptive partner.

== History ==
Junko Kaneda divides expressions of the yaoi hole in fiction into three distinct periods from the 1970s to the 1990s:

- The 1970s were the "age without holes". Kaneda notes that fellatio appears as the most common sexual act in yaoi doujinshi in the 1970s, and that her study of doujinshi from this period held by the Yoshihiro Yonezawa Memorial Library found no depictions of anal sex. (Note: Kaneda notes that Japanese male-male romance fiction predating the 1970s, such as the tanbi novels of Mari Mori, also do not depict yaoi holes.)
- The 1980s were the "age of hole-discovery". Though the first depiction of a yaoi hole is unknown, she notes that yaoi works during this period began to make clear references to non-oral penetrative sex, such as in Kaoru Kurimoto's novel Mayonaka no Tenshi (真夜中の天使; lit. 'Angel at Midnight').
- The 1990s were the "age of prostate-discovery", with an increase in depictions of prostate stimulation via fingering.

Since the 2000s, yaoi has depicted male-male sex with a greater degree of realism, referencing activities such as rectal douching and dry orgasms. Kaneda speculates that this may be due to the fact that media depicting male-male sex, such as educational books and gay pornography, has become more readily accessible due to the Internet. The BL news site Chill Chill noted that by the 2010s, yaoi hole media had been almost entirely supplanted by the Omegaverse subgenre, which depicts similar themes and subjects such as self-lubrication and male pregnancy.

== Analysis ==
1. Yaoi holes do exist

↳ It is a hole between the penis and anus

↳ It is a vaginal opening

↳ It can cause pregnancy

↳ The anus becomes a yaoi hole during sex
↳ "I don't want to call it a yaoi hole"

2. Yaoi holes do not exist

↳ It is an anus

↳ Anal sex in yaoi involves defecation

↳ Intestinal cleaning is necessary
↳ Intestinal cleaning is unnecessary

↳ Anal sex in yaoi does not involve defecation

↳ There are no holes whatsoever

3. I don't care about yaoi holes

↳ Yaoi is a fantasy
↳ Yaoi doesn't necessarily require penetration
↳ Yaoi should reflect reality

4. "Define yaoi hole" group

— 2channel tree chart on schools of belief in yaoi holes
Faction survey results (2014)
1. Yaoi holes do not exist – it is an anus (33.0%)
2. I don't care about yaoi holes – yaoi is a fantasy (27.0%)
3. Yaoi holes do exist – the anus becomes a yaoi hole during sex (18.0%)
4. I don't care about yaoi holes – yaoi doesn't necessarily require penetration (12.0%)
5. Other (10.0%)

The yaoi hole phenomenon can be understood in some regards as simply reflecting the lack of understanding about male anatomy and anal sex possessed by the (mostly female and heterosexual) writers of early yaoi. Alternately, yaoi holes can be understood as an intentional exaggeration reflecting a desire for fantasy over realism in pornographic fiction narratives, with parallels to the depiction of women with exaggerated or unnatural anatomy in male-oriented erotic manga.

In 2003, a copypasta of a tree chart detailing various nested factions of belief in yaoi holes was posted on the textboard 2channel, (Note: The chart was based on a 2001 post on the topic of "Does Rika Ishikawa take a shit?", in which a tree chart was created to divide posters into various factions of those who expressed either an affirmative or negative belief on the subject.) which was included in the 2015 book Otoko no Karada wa Kimochi Ii (オトコのカラダはキモチいい; lit. 'A Man's Body Feels Good'), co-written by Hitoshi Nimura, Kaneda, and Iku Okada. According to a survey conducted among the roughly one hundred attendees at the 2014 event "Let's talk about the future of the yaoi hole", the largest faction was "yaoi holes do not exist, it is an anus" at 33%, followed by "I don't care about yaoi holes, yaoi is a fantasy" at 27%, and "yaoi holes do exist, the anus becomes a yaoi hole during sex" third at 18%.

== See also ==
- Mpreg
- Futanari, comparable phenomenon in lesbian pornography
- -ussy
- Bonus hole, slang term for transgender men's vaginas

== Sources ==
- Aida, Miho (September 2013). 期待される腐女子像からのエクソダス:「可能性」の読み込み/誤読に関する一考察 [An Exodus from Expected Fujoshi Images: A Consideration on Reading into/Misreading of "Possibilities"]. 広島修大論集 広島修大論集 [Studies in the Humanities and Sciences] (in Japanese). 54 (1). Hiroshima Shudo University: 207–220. ISSN 1883-1400.
- Azuma, Sonoko (2009). "女性のホモソーシャルな欲望の行方――二次創作「やおい」についての一考察」" [The Future of Women's Homosocial Desires: A Study of Secondary "Yaoi"]. In Ohno, Michikuni; Ogawa, Nobuhiko (eds.). 文化の社会学―記憶・メディア・身体 [Sociology of Culture: Memory, Media, and the Body] (in Japanese). Bunrikaku. ISBN 978-4-89259-586-8.
- Galbraith, Patrick (September 2011). "Fujoshi: Fantasy Play and Transgressive Intimacy among "Rotten Girls" in Contemporary Japan". Signs. 37 (1). University of Chicago Press: 219–240. doi:10.1086/660182. JSTOR 10.1086/660182. S2CID 146718641.
- Miura, Shion; Kaneda, Junko (June 2007). 「攻め×受け」のめくるめく世界 男性身体の魅力を求めて [The Dazzling World of 'Seme' and 'Uke': Seeking the Charm of the Male Body]. ユリイカ [Eureka] (in Japanese). Vol. 39, no. 7, 2007年6月臨時増刊号 総特集=腐女子マンガ大系 [June 2007 Extra Issue, General Feature: Fujoshi Manga Series]. Seidosha. pp. 8–29. ISBN 978-4-7917-0163-6.
- Nimura, Hitoshi; Kaneda, Junko; Okada, Iku (2015). オトコのカラダはキモチいい [A Man's Body Feels Good] (in Japanese). Kadokawa Shoten. ISBN 978-4-04-067420-9.
- Saitō, Tamaki (2007). "Otaku Sexuality". In Bolton, Christopher; Csicsery-Ronay, Istvan Jr.; Tatsumi, Takayuki (eds.). Robot Ghosts and Wired Dreams: Japanese Science Fiction from Origins to Anime (PDF). University of Minnesota Press. pp. 222–249. ISBN 978-0-8166-4974-7.
- Shu, Kaori (2005). 挑発の１５秒 [15 Seconds of Provocation] (in Japanese). Tokuma Shoten. ISBN 978-4-19-900335-6.
- Tanaka, Nozomu (2008). 「愛」という権力 ― 「やおい」を求める女性の欲望 ― [The Power of "Love" - A Woman's Desire for "Yaoi"] (PDF) (Bachelor thesis) (in Japanese). Meiji Gakuin University.
