= Terminology of transgender anatomy =

A word cloud of how transmasculine people described their vaginas in the Ragosta et al. study (2021)

Transgender people use a variety of terms to refer to their genitals and other sexually dimorphic body parts and bodily functions. While some may use the standard clinical and colloquial terms (e.g. penis, dick; vagina, pussy), others follow neologistic approaches. These replacement words serve as alternatives to existing names that may conflict with a person's gender identity and trigger gender dysphoria. In medical contexts, providers may use traditional clinical terms, may mirror patients' preferred terms, or may use alternate terms such as internal genitals and external gonads.

Common approaches include using terms associated with analogous body parts (e.g. penis for a clitoris (Note: For the sake of clarity, this article uses clinical terminology to refer to all body parts, drawing a use–mention distinction from the replacement words it describes. As documented in this article, many transgender people describe their bodies in the same way.) or vice versa), modifying conventional terms to mark for gender (e.g. girldick or boy cunt), and novel terms that do not relate to existing terminology (e.g. front hole for a vagina). Some words are humorous, like hen for a transfeminine penis (contrast cock) or chesticles for a transmasculine breast.

The naming of body parts is an important component of transgender sexuality. Trans people may pick different words for different contexts. In both colloquial and medical contexts, experts emphasize deferring to individual preference.

== Context ==
One way many of us show our bodies love is by rewriting the language we use to describe them. Many of us have body parts that feel gendered in ways that do not match our sense of self. This can make it difficult for some of us to hear these body parts called by their standard names.

— Trans Bodies, Trans Selves

Prior to the 2010s, there was little research on the social aspects of transgender bodies. Elijah Adiv Edelman and Lal Zimman's 2014 article "Boycunts and Bonus Holes: Trans Men's Bodies, Neoliberalism, and the Sexual Productivity of Genitals" observed that while scholarly literature often cast transgender men as "female-bodied", trans men—including those non-operative with respect to bottom surgery—had increasingly come to see themselves as male-bodied. Edelman and Zimman associate this shift with trans men's willingness to refer to their genitals with both male and female terms, sometimes at the same time. Often, from this perspective, the difference between a cisgender man's penis and a non-operative transgender man's clitoris is merely one of size, not of kind.

Replacement words for body parts vary widely, and almost none approaches the currency of the word it replaces: In a 2021 study of transgender, nonbinary, and gender-expansive people, only two replacement words (chest for breasts and cum for sperm) were used by more than 50% of respondents, while 23% of the replacement words and phrases provided were unique.

Terms also exist to differentiate cisgender body parts without othering transgender parts, for instance factory-direct dick to refer to a cisgender man's penis.

== Colloquial terminology ==
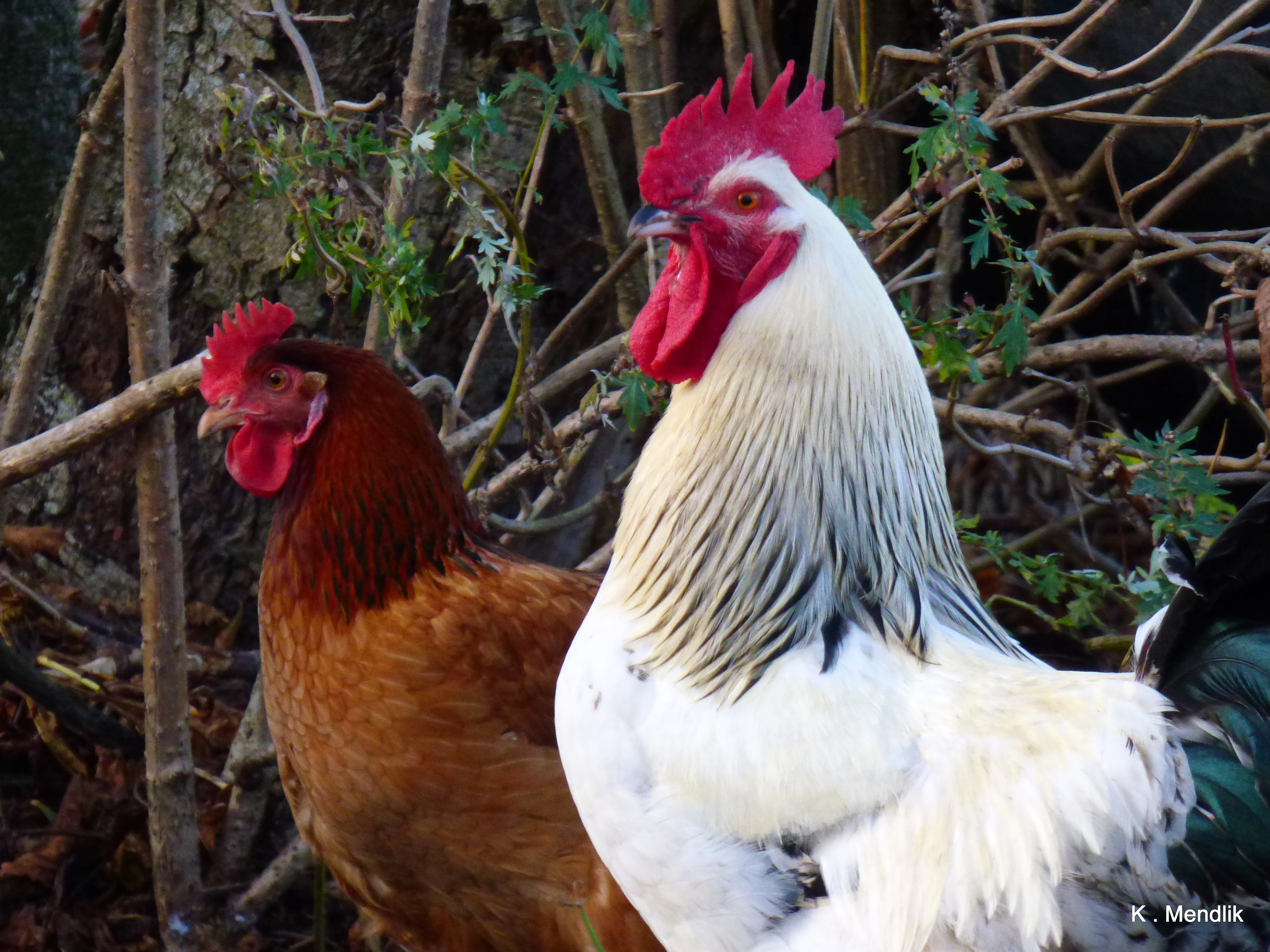
A cock and hen. Hen is used as wordplay to refer to transfeminine penises, extending from the use of cock to refer to men's penises.

Many trans people refer to body parts with words for comparable cross-sex body parts based on adequation (the finding of "sufficient similarity") with those body parts. For instance, some transfeminine people choose to refer to their anuses as vaginas, pussies, or cunts. Some transmasculine people refer to their clitorises as a dick or cock. Hybrid terms also exist: Dicklet (also diclit, dicklit, or dic-clit) is attested since the 1990s for transmasculine clitorises, although the popularity of this term was waning due to it being perceived as too feminine at the time that Zimman documented its usage in 2014.

More colorful terms include bussy for the anus; clit, strapless (contrast strapon), or hen (contrast cock) for the transfeminine penis; front hole, man cave or bonus hole for the transmasculine vagina; and chesticles for the transmasculine breast. Generic euphemistic terms are also used, such as down there, peepee, and schlong for transmasculine genitals and lady bits for transfeminine.

Some trans people are less uncomfortable with their body or do not associate their sexually dimorphic body parts with their gender assigned at birth. For instance, in contrast to a cisnormative definition of vagina as belonging to a woman, a transmasculine person might use the term to refer simply to that structure without gendered connotations, either on its own or in constructions such as boy cunt or (somewhat humorously) mangina. Similarly, a transfeminine person might refer to a girldick. The transmasculine usage of slang terms for the penis and the transfeminine girl-prefixed variants are observed particularly, but not exclusively, among those undergoing gender-affirming hormone therapy, which changes the appearance and function of sex organs.

Trans people use such terms as part of expressing their sexuality. Replacement words can serve as a micro-affirmation of a partner's identity during sex, as this can be an environment of heightened gender dysphoria. The wellness guide Trans Bodies, Trans Selves advises, "Find language that makes you feel good, use it, share it with [sex] partners, and have fun."

Attested replacement words (Note: Not all of these terms have the same level of currency, or may have become dated since their usage was documented. Some may be considered offensive in some or most contexts.)
Anus	back hole, bussy, cunt, man hole, pussy, vagina
Breast and chest (Note: Clinically speaking, both males and females have both a breast and a chest. In colloquial English, however, the former term is more associated with women's breasts and the latter with men's chests.)	breasts or chest, chesticles
Clitoris	cock, dangle, dick, dicklet (also diclit, dicklit or dic-clit), package, peepee, penis, prick, schlong, the little guy, weenie
Inguinal canals	cunts
Menstruation	bleeding, shark week
Penis	clit or clitoris, click, girlcock, girldick, hen, junk, lady bits, shenis, strapless, strapoff
Vagina	bonus hole, boy cunt, boy pussy, boy snatch, front hole, genitals, mangina, man cave, man cunt
Uterus	duderus

This list encompasses only those terms that differ from those used by cisgender people. In Ragosta et al.'s 2021 study, the majority of respondents sometimes or always used the clinical term, and many used slang synonyms, such as using cunt instead of vagina.

== Medical terminology ==
Although some medical authorities recommend mirroring the terminology transgender people use to describe their own genitals, this can seem unfittingly intimate, as many transgender people use different terms in medical contexts than they would in personal settings; however, patients may also be uncomfortable with anatomical terms they perceive as gendered. Specialists recommend using, or being open to using, sex-neutral terms for organs, such as external genitals or lateral folds for the labia, internal reproductive organs for the uterus and ovaries, and chest for the breasts. Others recommend terminology that can be used to refer to genitals regardless of sex, such as erectile tissue for either the penis or clitoris and gonads for either the ovaries or testes, as well as using unlabeled anatomical charts.

Style guides such as the Publication Manual of the American Psychological Association and AMA Manual of Style recommend using gender-neutral language and distinguishing between gender and biological sex, but do not give guidance on specific anatomical terminology. However, some specialist style guides such as that of the International Lactation Consultant Association do give recommendations in this respect.

Medical terminology
Breasts	upper body, chest		
Vagina	internal genitals		genitals
Penis	erogenous tissue, erectile tissue, glans (specifically for the head of the penis)	external genitals or external genitalia	genitals
Clitoris	erogenous tissue, erectile tissue, glans (specifically for the head of the penis)	external genitals or external genitalia	
Labia	lateral folds	external genitals or external genitalia	
Vulva	external genital area, external pelvic area, external pelvic region		
Vaginal introitus	canal, introitus, opening, opening of the genitals		
Uterus	internal reproductive organs		
Ovaries	internal reproductive organs	internal gonads	gonads
Testicles	external gonads		gonads
Scrotum	pouch covering gonads, skin covering gonads		
Breastfeeding	chestfeeding		
Breast milk	human milk, parent's milk, chest milk		
Biological mother	gestational parent, birthing parent		
Menstruation	monthly bleeding		
Erection	physical arousal, hardening of erectile tissues		
Male pattern baldness	hair loss		
