= Dysphoric milk ejection reflex =

- Differential diagnosis: Postpartum depression, Breastfeeding aversion response (BAR)

Dysphoric milk ejection reflex (D-MER) is a condition in which people who breastfeed develop negative emotions that begin just before the milk ejection reflex and last less than a few minutes. It is different from postpartum depression, breastfeeding aversion response (BAR), or a dislike of breastfeeding. It has been described anecdotally many times, yet one of the earliest case studies on the condition was only published in 2011, and not much research was done prior to that. Even in 2021 when the first review of published literature was done the authors noted that health care providers were still "barely [able to] recognize D-MER."

The feelings described may also occur in women who are not currently, or never have been, breastfeeding. A recent groundbreaking study in 2023 found the prevalence of D-MER in Australian breastfeeding women was 6% or around 1 in 15 women In these cases, stimulation of the nipples produces a similar, dysphoric feeling as described by women with a condition identified as D-MER. A link between local dopamine blockage and the precise location of AMPA-glutamate blockage in the nucleus accumbens, and the subsequent experience of stimuli as negative or positive has been researched but not confirmed as the cause of D-MER and related conditions.

== Signs and symptoms ==
The lactating woman develops a brief period of dysphoria that begins just prior to the milk ejection reflex and continues for not more than several minutes. It may recur with every milk release, any single release, or only with the initial milk release at each feeding. D-MER always presents as an emotional reaction but may also produce a hollow or churning feeling in the pit of the stomach, nausea, restlessness, and/or general unease. When experiencing D-MER, mothers may report any of a spectrum of different unpleasant emotions, ranging from depression to anxiety to anger. Each of these emotions can be felt at a different level of intensity.

== Diagnosis ==
- D-MER does not appear to be a psychological response to breastfeeding. It is possible for women to have psychological responses to breastfeeding, but D-MER gives evidence of being a physiological reflex.
- D-MER is not postpartum depression or a postpartum mood disorder. A woman can have D-MER and PPD, but they are separate conditions and the common treatments for PPD do not treat D-MER. The majority of women with D-MER report no other mood disorders.
- D-MER is not the "breastfeeding aversion response (BAR)" that can happen to some when continuing to nurse while pregnant. Breastfeeding aversion response occurs upon nipple contact when nursing whereas D-MER is triggered by the let-down reflex, even if it is several minutes after latching.

== Management ==
There is no product that is medically approved to treat D-MER. It has been hypothesized that efforts to raise dopamine may help, and anecdotal evidence encourages a healthy diet limiting caffeine intake and adding supplements.

=== Emotional support ===
The most effective treatments for D-MER to date have been awareness, understanding, and education. Many mothers struggling with D-MER attribute a much higher level of intensity to their symptoms before learning what is causing them. When mothers understand that they are not alone in this condition and realize that it is a physiological reaction, they seem much less inclined to wean their child prematurely.

== History ==
The first documented reference to a hormonally based negative emotional reaction while breastfeeding was found online in a forum in June 2004. Prior to the launch of D-MER.org the phenomenon was unknown, unnamed, misunderstood and rarely mentioned or talked about. The term dysphoric milk ejection reflex (D-MER) came from Alia Macrina Heise who described it in 2007. It was chosen due to the emotional reaction (dysphoria) to milk let-down (milk ejection reflex). The "milk ejection reflex" is abbreviated among lactation professionals and referred to as the M-E-R. In 2008 a team of lactation consultants, headed up by Diane Wiessinger, worked together and consulted with other medical professionals to do a preliminary investigation to better understand D-MER. Case reports and case series have been published on the topic. A 2019 study reported a prevalence rate of 9.1%. An October 2021 review of literature published to that date reported:

Due to poor public awareness of D-MER and the scarcity of evidence-based literature, many mothers may mistake D-MER for postpartum depression, especially given its atypical symptomatic manifestations. Additionally, lactation practitioners and health care providers may have limited recognition of D-MER. Another challenge in managing D-MER is that mental health professionals may lack knowledge about lactation or training in lactation management. This makes it necessary to educate mothers because educated mothers are usually better at handling postpartum situations if they are prepared in advance.
