= Diane Wiessinger =

American author and researcher

- Education: Cornell University
- Occupation: breastfeeding advocate
- Years active: 1985 - present
- Organization(s): La Leche League International, International Board-Certified Lactation Consultant
- Known for: essay "Watch Your Language!"

Diane Wiessinger is an American breastfeeding advocate, author and researcher who is known for her essay "Watch your language!", which asserts that breastfeeding is normal, not superior. The term "Wiessingerize" in the circles of breastfeeding advocates means to talk about breastfeeding as the norm to which other forms of nurturing and nourishing children is compared.

== Biography ==
Diane Wiessinger received her Master of Science Degree in Ecology and Evolutionary Biology from Cornell University in 1978. She later married John Wiessinger and has two sons, Eric and Scott.

== Career ==
Diane Wiessinger became a La Leche League Leader in 1985 and in 1990 she became an International Board Certified Lactation Consultant. In 1992 she opened her private lactation consultant practice.

In 1996 Wiessinger wrote her seminal essay "Watch your language!", pioneering research into the language that is used to describe breastfeeding. More than a decade later her astute observations were backed up by academic research.

In her 2010 book with Diana West and Teresa Pitman for La Leche League International, The Womanly Art of Breastfeeding, 8th edition, Wiessinger, West, and Pitman re-wrote La Leche League International's landmark book about breastfeeding for the new millennial generation.

In her 2014 book with Diana West, Linda J. Smith, and Teresa Pitman for La Leche League International, Sweet Sleep: Nighttime and Naptime Strategies for the Breastfeeding Family, Wiessinger, West, Smith, and Pitman examined the risks and safety of bedsharing for breastfeeding mothers as a strategy to improve breastfeeding outcomes, and provided strategies to make bedsharing safer and easier.
