= -ussy =

English-language morpheme

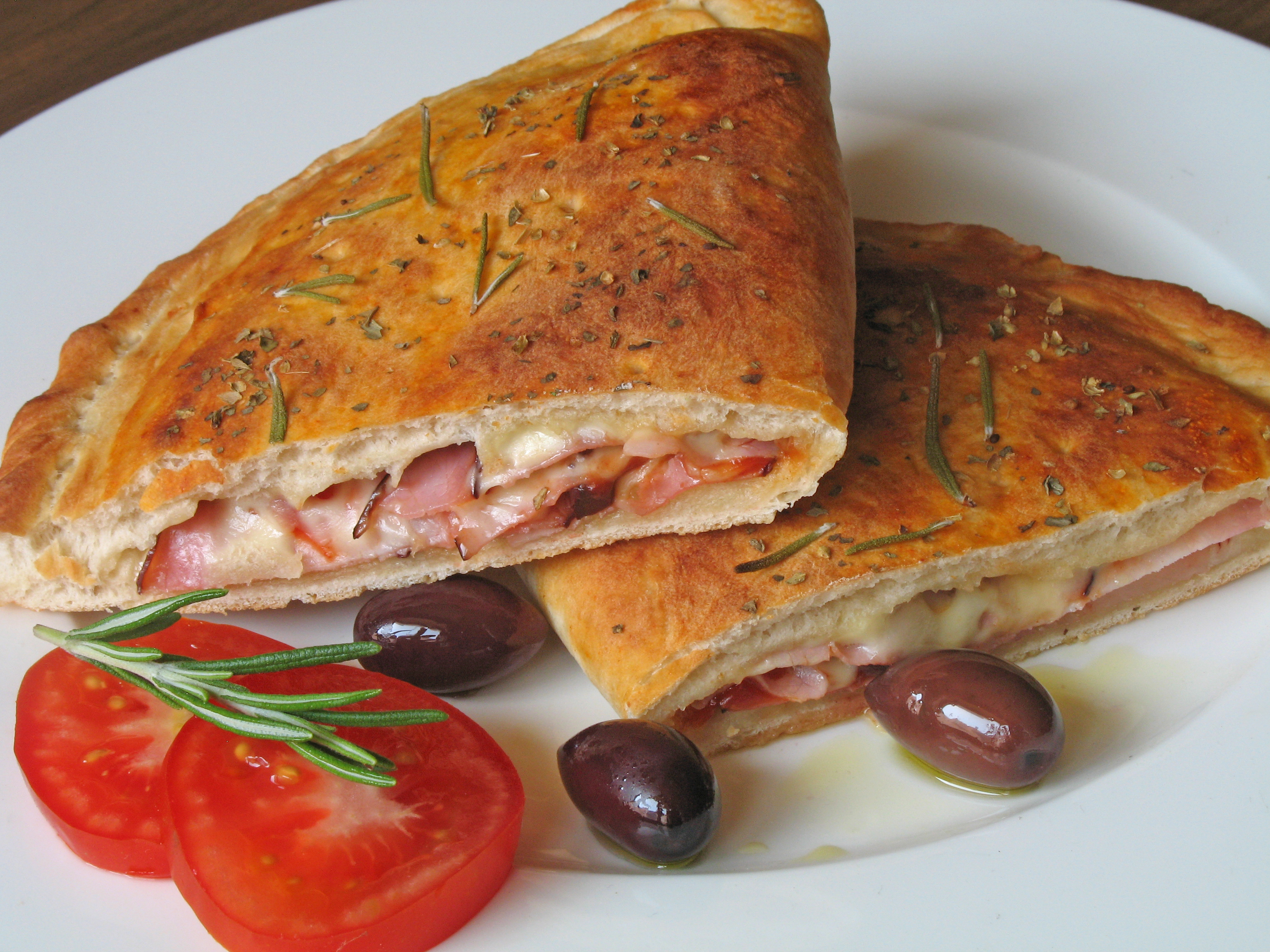
A calzone could be called a pizzussy.

-ussy (/ˈʊsi/ UUS-ee) is an English-language morpheme realized from the word pussy to create novel derived terms, implying resemblance to a vulva or vagina. Portmanteaus derived from pussy have existed in LGBTQ slang since the early 2000s, in the form bussy (boy pussy), but were popularized in the late 2010s and early 2020s on social media platforms including Tumblr and TikTok. In 2022, the American Dialect Society named -ussy their word of the year.

== History ==
According to Université de Montréal linguist Michael Dow, portmanteaus derived from pussy first originated within LGBTQ slang, including the terms mussy (man + pussy) and bussy (boy pussy or sometimes butthole pussy) which were recorded in a gay slang dictionary in 1999 and on Urban Dictionary in 2004. Bussy is generally defined as referring to the male anus. (Note: Bussy can also be used to refer to a transmasculine person's vagina.) Dow tentatively calls these terms "pussy blends", but distinguishes them from true blends, and instead categorizes -ussy as a fractomorpheme analogous to -holic (from alcoholic) and -gate (from Watergate).

The suffix was popularized by a viral Tumblr post from April 2017 that coined the term thrussy (throat + pussy, implying deep-throating). A month later, an internet meme consisting of computer-generated songs with lyrics such as "Mr. Krabs is one thicc bih, let me see that krussy", leading to further novel forms such as waussy (referencing Wario), babussy (referencing Babadook), and computussy (Karen the Computer). From June to August 2017, at least 1,338 -ussy blends appeared on Twitter. Other examples include Thatchussy (Margaret Thatcher + pussy), clussy (clown pussy), grussy (Grinch + pussy), nussy (nose + pussy), and birdussy (referring to a bird's cloaca).

Use of -ussy as a suffix (sometimes called -ussification) was popularized on TikTok beginning in late 2021. The suffix has been used in reference to a physical hole (e.g., a donutussy) as well as to emphasize effort (e.g., a barista may "put their whole baristaussy" into creating the perfect latte art).

The suffix was named the word of the year for 2022 by the American Dialect Society, with its president Ben Zimmer stating the selection "highlights how creativity in new word formation has been embraced online in venues like TikTok."

A 2024 Dune: Part Two movie promotional popcorn bucket covered with a sandworm mouth was called a Duneussy by a magazine editor and gained Internet fame for resembling an artificial vagina. The 2024 film Deadpool & Wolverine satirized the "Duneussy" popcorn bucket with their own bucket dubbed the Wolvussy, featuring the character Wolverine's open mouth as the bucket lid.

== See also ==
- Terminology of transgender anatomy
- Dick joke
- Productivity (linguistics)
- Yaoi hole
