= Pat Shelly =

Pat Shelly is the founder and director of The Breastfeeding Center for Greater Washington, a non-profit organization in Northwest Washington, DC, and leading breastfeeding activist. An International Board Certified Lactation Consultant, ASPO Certified Lamaze Instructor, Certified Infant Massage Instructor, and Registered Nurse, Shelly has over 25 years of experience in women's and children's health. Her background includes work in military hospitals, Inova Alexandria Hospital, Columbia Hospital for Women, corporate and community outreach, home visits, and private practice.

Known in the community as "The Breast Whisperer" and "The Mary Poppins of Breastfeeding," she has appeared in local and national news programs, radio, and newspapers, including the Fox News Channel, The Washington Post, NBC 4 and the WashingtonPost.com's "Smart Living" section. On May 3, 2008 on FNC's Fox and Friends, Shelly emphasized the keys to successful breastfeeding as "early, effective and frequent" sessions and frequent skin-to-skin contact between the mother and baby. In response to Time Magazine's controversial cover photo of a woman breastfeeding an older toddler, Shelly stated "there's more danger in standing on a stool like that, than there is in breastfeeding a three year old."

Shelly is an active member of the Lactation Consultant Association of Greater Washington. She received her BSN from DePaul University and a master's degree in health care management.

== See also ==
- Breastfeeding Center for Greater Washington
- List of breastfeeding activists
