= Constance Thalken =

American intermedia artist (born 1952)

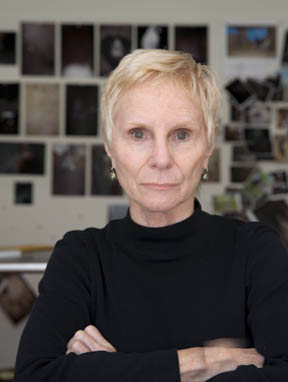
- Born: 1952
- Education: Yale University, MFA
- Known for: Photography, video, sound, performance, installation

Constance Thalken (/tah-kin/; born 1952 in Nebraska) is an American intermedia artist known mostly for her photographic explorations of the complexities of loss. She has gained recognition for her ability to carefully convey subject matter that simultaneously engages the viewer perceptually, emotionally, viscerally and intellectually.

== Early life and education ==
Thalken was born in Columbus, Nebraska. She has lived in the Chicago area, the coalfields of Eastern Kentucky and in Knoxville, Tennessee. She has a BA in psychology from Barat College and completed an MFA in photography at Yale University in 1988. On graduation, she was awarded the Yale School of Art's Alice Kimball English Traveling Fellowship to photograph in the Yukon Territory of Canada. In 1990, she accepted a teaching position with the Welch School of Art and Design at Georgia State University (GSU) in Atlanta where she continues to reside. She was awarded professor emerita status when she retired from GSU in 2018.

== Career ==
Many of Thalken's influences lie beyond the realm of photography. She is inspired by readings in philosophy, anthropology, fiction, poetry and critical writings. These sources shape her work and provide further depth to her investigations. She has received numerous honors and awards for her work. Her work is in the permanent collections of the High Museum of Art, the Museum of Fine Arts in Houston, the Birmingham Museum of Art in Alabama, the Museum of Contemporary Art of Georgia, Yale University Library, The Bunnen Collection, the Zuckerman Museum of Art and Dean, Ringers, Morgan and Lawton of Orlando, Florida, along with other private collections.

Thalken is represented by Whitespace Gallery in Atlanta.

== Work ==
=== Notable projects ===
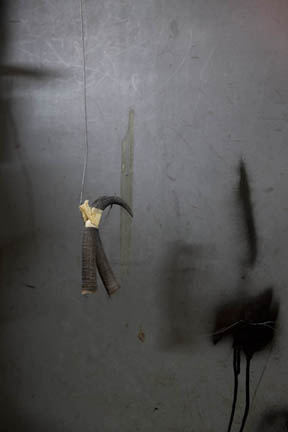
Eyes Open Slowly #2, 2013 43" x 28-1/2", archival pigment printed mounted on dibond

Eyes Open Slowly
This 2015 project draws from Thalken's investigations of a taxidermy shop. The body of work includes portrait-like images of stuffed animals in process as well as abstracted close-ups of animal hide, fur and surfaces, such as the salt floor of the shop. Among the images is a detail of animal scratches on a steel exterior door of the shop. The taxidermy process is denoted with varying degrees of subtlety. The completed animals appear alive, while others are pinned and taped and in process of becoming "animal". A signature image depicts a pair of chamois horns, taped together and hanging from wire. Thalken's imagery evokes comparisons between taxidermy and embalming, humans and animals, life and death, and speaks to loss and grief.

1.2 cm =
In 1.2 cm =, Thalken presents 45 photographs of bodily "discards" that were removed during her 14-month treatment for breast cancer accompanied by three large scale self-portraits. The photographs of the discarded bandages are labeled with their corresponding medical procedures, e.g. "Biopsy #2 11/27/09" and "Haircut #1 2/23/10", a bundle of hair from her first treatment-induced haircut. The installation includes an ultrasound image of her tumor housed in a lightbox with a list of statistics compiled from her period of treatments. The title refers to the size of her tumor and invites comparison between the small physical size of the tumor and its profound impact on the body and mind. As a whole, the work employs illness as a metaphor for exploring loss, mortality, coping and the body as a medical object.

The Soul Is A Light Housekeeper
This project is derived from monthly collections of debris collected from the artist's vacuum cleaner over the course of one year. The photographs, each scaled to the size of the debris pile, document the discarded remnants of daily life and the routines surrounding them. According to Thalken, the images comment "on the former life of the material itself and on my life as the generator and gatherer of the remains".

Red Jacket
Inspired by the death of her mother from Alzheimer's disease in 2000, Red Jacket is a 13-minute multi-media performance that re-enacts Thalken's selective memories of her mother. The piece explores several aspects of loss including grief and the manner in which dementia erased the identity of her mother.

Ancient Pieties: Maps of Mexico
This body of work consists of photographs that combine images of animals with the landscape and religious iconography of Mexico. The images were created by layering multiple Polaroid film exposures to convey a sense of indeterminacy. Thalken describes this technique as a means to not only "dematerialize the animal in order to convey its spiritual nature", but also to suggest "“the duality of life and death and the uncertainty that lies between".

Fragments of An Elegy
Photographed over the course of five years, these images primarily refer to the annual alligator harvests of coastal regions of Louisiana and the Florida Panhandle. The work explores issues of mortality, cycles of life and human-animal hierarchies.

=== Permanent collections ===
High Museum of Art, Atlanta, Georgia
The Museum of Fine Arts, Houston, Texas
The Birmingham Museum of Art, Birmingham, Alabama
The Museum of Contemporary Art of Georgia, Atlanta, Georgia
The Bunnen Collection, Atlanta, Georgia Yale University Library, New Haven, Connecticut Dean, Ringers, Morgan and Lawton, Orlando, Florida Georgia Perimeter College, Clarkston, Georgia

== Sources ==
- Francisco, Jason (February 5, 2013), "Photographer and cancer survivor Constance Thalken gives new meaning to "personal"", Arts ATL.
- Lampe, Lilly (January 2013), "The power of 1.2 cm = at Whitespace Gallery", BurnAway.
- McClure, Faith (2015, December). “Unraveling the elegiac in Eyes Open Slowly”. Catalog Essay for exhibit at The Light Factory, Charlotte North Carolina.
- McClure, Faith (May 28, 2015), "Constance Thalken's "Eyes Open Slowly" profound meditation on mortality, at Whitespace", Arts ATL.
- McClure, Faith (January 1, 2014), "Notable exhibitions, works of art and experiences of 2013, Arts ATL.
- Weiskopf, Dan (June 2015), "The afterlives of animals: Constance Thalken at Whitespac", BurnAway.
- Graves, Kris; Seikaly, Roula; Feinstein, Jon, On Death, 2019, +KGP, New York, NY.
- Amon, Stephanie (December 1, 2018), "Now You Don't: Photography and Extinction", In The In-Between.
- Kisiel, Emma (April 19, 2017), "Constance Thalken: Eyes Open Slowly"
- Dozois, Michelle (July 24, 2016), "What You Collect: The Ordinary and the Odd", The New York Times(subscription required).
