= Cranmer House (Denver, Colorado) =

Historic house in Colorado, United States

- U.S. National Register of Historic Places
- Colorado State Register of Historic Properties
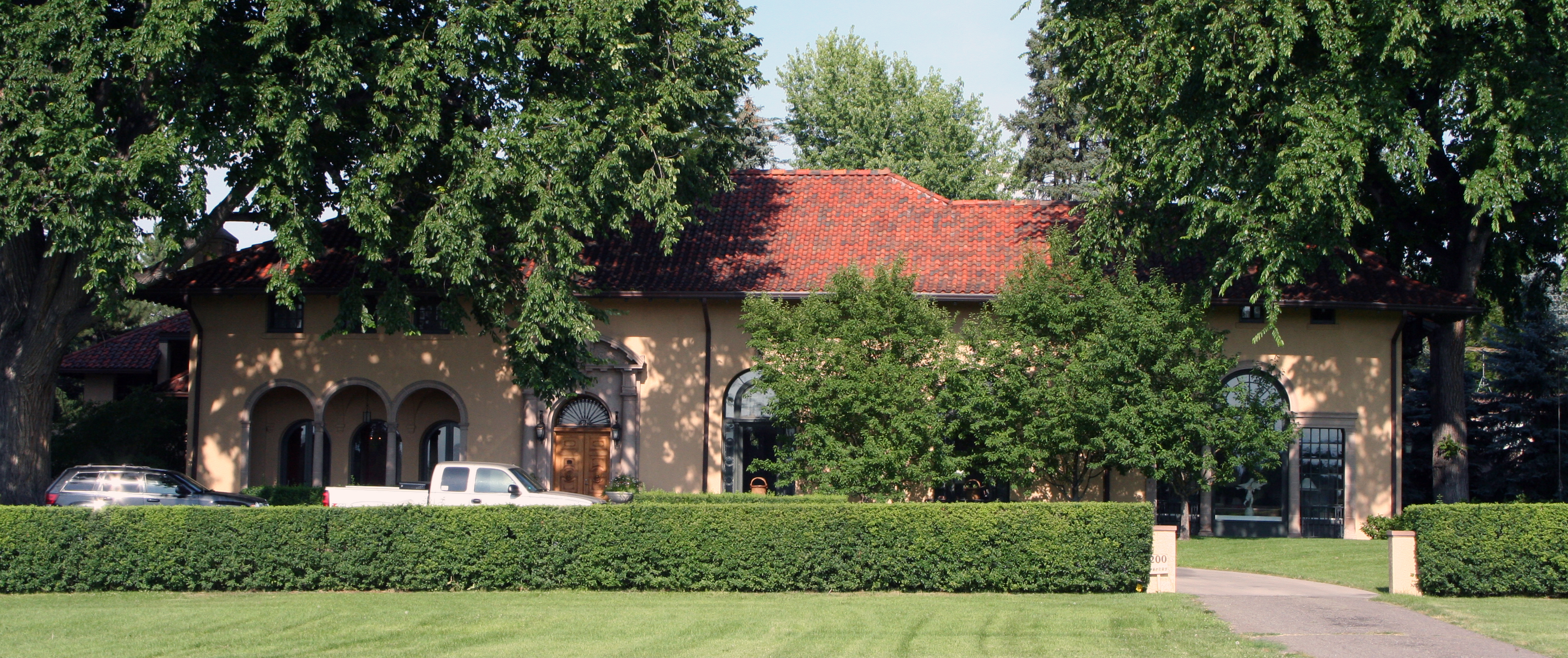

- Location within Colorado Location within the United States
- Interactive map showing the location of Cranmer House
- Location: 200 Cherry St., Denver, Colorado
- Coordinates: 39°43′11″N 104°55′59″W
- Area: less than one acre
- Built: 1917
- Architect: Jacques Benedict; Burnham Hoyt
- Architectural style: Renaissance
- MPS: Jules Jacques Benoit Benedict Architecture in Colorado MPS
- NRHP reference No.: 05000732
- CSRHP No.: 5DV.9199
- Added to NRHP: July 27, 2005

Cranmer House, also known as Kerwin House, is a historic two-story, stucco-clad Italian Renaissance Revival house at 200 Cherry Street in Denver, Colorado. The house was built in 1917 for George E. Cranmer, who was Denver Manager of Improvement and Parks. It was designed by architect Jacques Benedict. An addition built in the late 1920s, including a dormer, was designed by architect Burnham Hoyt. The house was purchased by Thomas and Mary Ann Kerwin, one of the co-founders of La Leche League, in the 1960s; they and their children resided there for 30 years.

The house was listed on the National Register of Historic Places in 2005.
