= Barat College =

Catholic college in Lake Forest, Illinois (1858–2005)

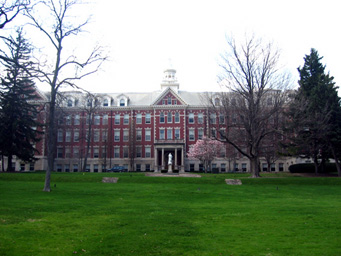
- Active: 1858–2005
- Location: Lake Forest, Illinois, USA; 42.2334°N 87.8297°W
- Nickname: Bulldogs
- Mascot: Bulldog

Barat College of the Sacred Heart was a small Catholic college located in Lake Forest, Illinois, 30 miles (48 km) north of Chicago. The college was named after Madeleine Sophie Barat, founder of the Society of the Sacred Heart.

Barat College was purchased by DePaul University in 2001, but closed in 2005; the faculty and student body were absorbed by DePaul, and the campus and educational inventory were sold.

== History ==
Barat College began as an academy for young women in Chicago in 1858 and moved to its Lake Forest location in 1904. In 1918, the state of Illinois chartered Barat as a four-year college. In 1964 85 women graduated from the university. In 1982, Barat became a coeducational institution. To qualify for federal financial programs, governance of the college passed from the Society of the Sacred Heart to an independent board of trustees in 1969. In February 2001, because of fiscal concerns, Barat College was purchased by DePaul University, becoming one of DePaul's seven colleges. The college was then renamed Barat College of DePaul University.

In February 2004, the DePaul University Trustee Board voted to discontinue operating Barat College despite a 14–11 vote by the DePaul Faculty Council to continue the alliance. DePaul then began to accept proposals for the future of the college, culminating in the proposal for a relationship with the American College of Education. Through its wholly owned Illinois subsidiary, they acquired a substantial portion of the educational business of Barat College, including the library materials, regional accreditation through the Higher Learning Commission of the North Central Association and permits and other authorizations from governmental authorities, education agencies, or other third parties.

In 2006, the campus was sold to Lake Forest housing developer Robert G. Shaw (Barat Woods LLC), for development as condominium residences. Shaw declined to say what he paid for the Barat property but said it was "less than $20 million." The courtyard and part of the Old Main building were to be preserved. However, the 50,000-square-foot (4,600 m^{2}) Thabor Wing, which was added to the building in 1924 and contained the Italianate style Sacred Heart Chapel, was to be demolished. Shaw's development plans met resistance from a number of factions who favored building preservation, including the advocacy group Landmarks Illinois, which placed the property's Sacred Heart Chapel on the list of Illinois' Top 10 Endangered Places. Although Lake Forest's Historic Preservation Commission voted to save the chapel, in April 2007 the Lake Forest City Council approved its demolition. Before demolition could proceed, the property fell into foreclosure and was purchased in 2010 by Harris Bank. In August 2011, the Woodlands Academy of the Sacred Heart, a Catholic high school adjacent to the 23-acre Barat campus, announced that the land was being gifted to the Academy by anonymous donors. On December 12, 2012, the birthday of St. Madeleine Sophie Barat, who founded the Society of the Sacred Heart in 1800, the property transfer was completed. In 2013, the Old Main building was demolished, although the cupola from the building was removed, restored and in 2015, placed in an area on campus designated the "Barat Cupola Garden" and walking path.

Barat College housed the academic records of Duchesne College in Omaha, Nebraska. These records along with the academic records were transferred to the Society of the Sacred Heart. Individuals who attended Duchesne College (another Sacred Heart School) can ask for their transcripts through the Society of the Sacred Heart Archives, US Province in St. Louis, Missouri. The Barat Education Foundation, an independent 501(c)(3) corporation, continues and advances the Barat legacy. Its website provides information of interest to Barat College alumni and friends of the foundation. A brief history of the college from 1904 to 2004 is included in the issue of Barat Magazine.

Barat College, in its heyday, thrived during a time of expansion for women's colleges. In the 1960s Barat College was part of seven schools of higher education run by the RSCJ. The Society of the Sacred Heart moved away from managing women's colleges in the 1970s to focus on K-12 education. In 2001 Barat College became part of DePaul University.

Barat College's faculty were absorbed mostly by DePaul University and many of them still teach there today. The Society of the Sacred Heart sisters who still lived on campus were displaced to communities across the country. Barat's cemetery is still preserved, at the back of the property behind the dormitories.

In March 2008, the Barat campus was one of several locations used for filming of a horror movie entitled The Unborn.

In 2012, Loyola Press published a book on the history of Barat College entitled, Barat College: A Legacy, a Spirit, and a Name, which was written by Martha Curry, RSCJ.

== Notable alumni ==
- Jane Byrne, mayor of Chicago from 1979 to 1983 (BS 1955)
- Jeanne Hurley Simon, Illinois state legislator
- Mary Ann Kerwin (B.A. 1953), co-founder of the La Leche League
- Mary Maher, journalist, trade unionist, and feminist
- Ann Stepan, Illinois state legislator
- Constance Thalken, (B.A 1974), photographer

== See also ==
- Woodlands Academy of the Sacred Heart
