= Herbert Ratner =

American physician and philosopher (1907–1997)

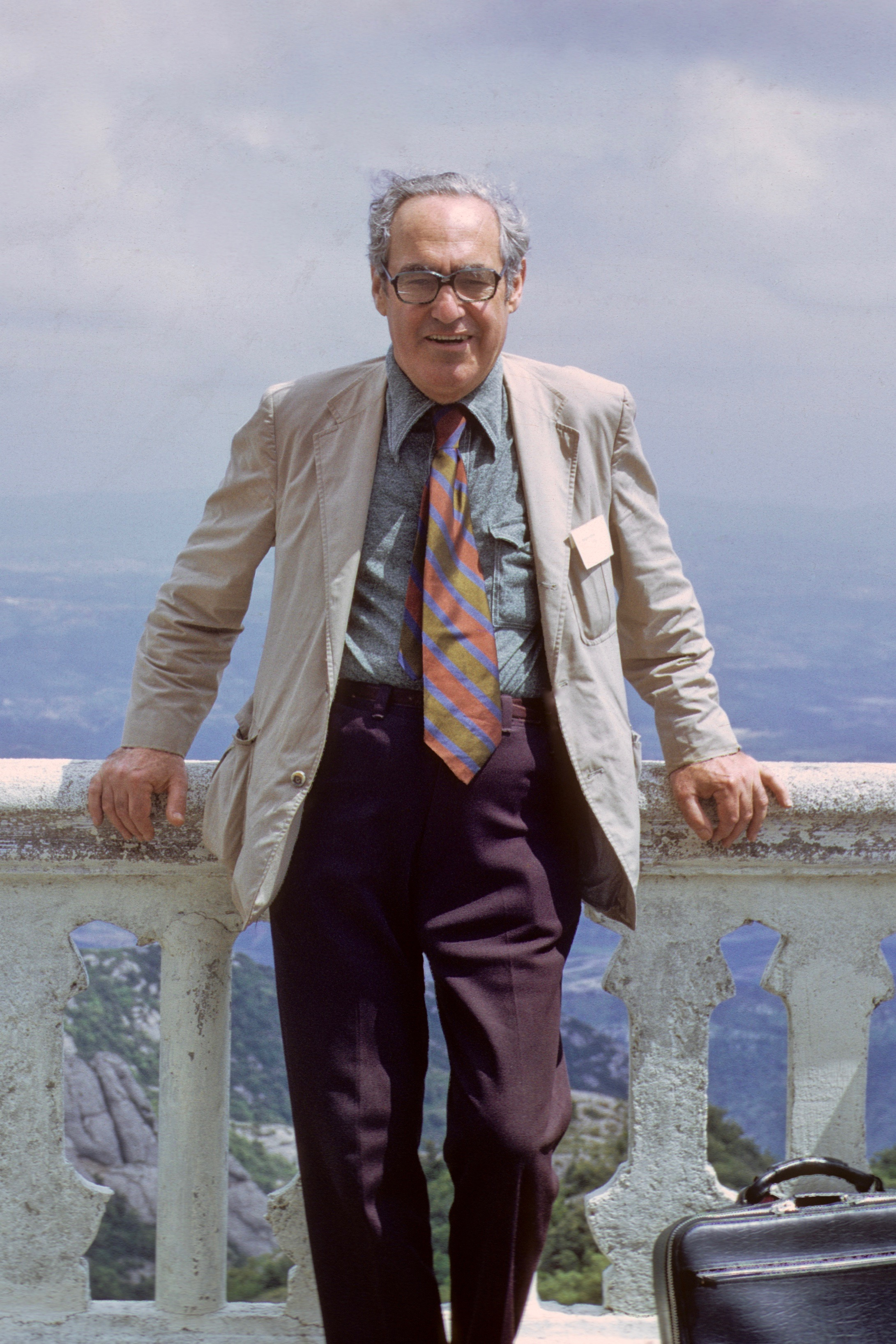
- Ratner at Montserrat in June 1974
- Born: May 23, 1907; Manhattan, New York, U.S.
- Died: December 6, 1997 (aged 90); Cleveland, Ohio, U.S.
- Spouse: Dorothy Smith Ratner

Herbert Spencer Ratner, also known as Herbert Albert Ratner (May 23, 1907 – December 6, 1997), was an American physician and philosopher. He taught and wrote on the philosophy and history of medicine and was a popular lecturer on marriage and the family. Ratner was the director of public health for the community of Oak Park, Illinois, for twenty-five years. An advocate of preventive family medicine based on natural norms, he was also a long-time proponent of informed medical consent, and played a pivotal role in the polio vaccine controversy beginning in 1955. For more than twenty-nine years Ratner was editor of Child and Family Quarterly, a paramedical journal which ran articles on the Hippocratic Oath, infant development, women’s health, and other topics related to family health.

== Early life ==
The youngest of seven children born in New York City to Russian-Jewish immigrants Leo and Sophia “Sonia” (née Maazel), and named after the English philosopher Herbert Spencer, Ratner grew up in Manhattan. His mother Sonia, who had sung professionally as a young woman, was the sister of Isaac Maazel who was a first violinist at the Metropolitan Opera Orchestra after formerly having been concert master to the czar. Ratner's father Leo was a physician, a graduate of New York Medical College (1892). A socialist who had no use for religion, he died when Ratner was fourteen leaving him dependent on his older brothers for the financing of his education during the years of the Great Depression. These brothers were George, a dentist who was one of the first to use x-rays in dentistry; Bret, a pediatrician and immunologist who was author of a popular textbook of pediatrics; and Victor, at one time vice-president of advertising and sales promotion for CBS. Two other siblings Mary and Walter died in early childhood. A remaining sister Helen died in 1938 of tuberculosis after a lengthy illness.

== University of Michigan years ==
After attending Los Angeles Public High School in California his freshman year and DeWitt Clinton Public High School in New York the remaining three years, Ratner went on to the University of Michigan in Ann Arbor. There he received the B.A. degree in 1929, completed his medical studies in 1934, and received the M.D. degree in 1935. While in Ann Arbor he married fellow medical student Dorothy Smith who received the M.D. degree in 1934 after having attended public high school in Swanton, Ohio and after having received the B.A. degree at Toledo University. She was born in Sylvania Township, Lucas County, Ohio, the daughter of a farm family of twelve children and the granddaughter of Yankee and German-American settlers in the county.

As a research assistant in the Pasteur Institute of the University of Michigan Ratner spent two years (1929-1931) teaching in the department of bacteriology under the legendary Dr. Frederick G. Novy, a strict taskmaster who had studied in Berlin under Robert Koch and at the Pasteur Institute in Paris under the immediate successor of Louis Pasteur. Dorothy for her part was a teaching assistant in physiology for one year.

From 1934 to 1936 Herbert and Dorothy were research assistants under Dr. Louis H. Newburgh in the Division of Clinical Investigation at the University of Michigan. While Dorothy earned an M.A. in nutrition, Herbert studied public health and in off hours took extracurricular courses in philosophy from his one-time classmate Herbert Schwartz who had studied philosophy under Richard McKeon at Columbia University. Before leaving the University of Michigan with Dorothy for a year in New York to be near his mother while his sister was dying, Ratner became interested in the philosophy and history of medicine.

== University of Chicago years ==
In 1937 Robert Maynard Hutchins, president of the University of Chicago, appointed Ratner a senior member of the Committee on Liberal Arts of the University of Chicago, a position he held until 1939. There he did research in the history of medicine as an assistant to Mortimer Adler, the founder of the Great Books Program, with whom he shared an office. This was a time of intellectual ferment when the neo-Scholastic movement was sweeping American academia. A re-examination of the great minds of the past – Plato, Aristotle, Thomas Aquinas – was taking place. Ratner was particularly interested in how classical thought interfaced with modern medicine.

Another phenomenon was also taking place at the University of Chicago among Ratner’s friends and acquaintances. Impressed with the writings of Thomas Aquinas, many were becoming attracted to the Catholic Church. One psychiatrist friend and medical school classmate became a Trappist monk. Having been raised with no religion by an atheist father, Ratner, too, felt this attraction and entered the Catholic Church in 1938. He remained a committed Catholic throughout his life, becoming an active, long-time member of the Chicago Catholic Physicians’ Guild, as well as serving a term as president of the National Federation of Catholic Physicians Guilds, which later was renamed the Catholic Medical Association.

== Professional appointments, positions, and publications ==
In 1939 through 1940 Ratner was scientific consultant to Robert Maynard Hutchins. During 1941 he took a year-long general internship at Loretto Hospital in Chicago. Between 1942 and 1949, and to some extent beyond this time, Ratner was in private practice in Chicago as a general practitioner. In 1942 Ratner was appointed director of Student Health and associate clinical professor of Family and Community Medicine at the Stritch School of Medicine of Loyola University in Chicago. Between 1946 and 1948 he served as medical consultant to the Encyclopædia Britannica Great Books Syntopicon. In 1949 Ratner accepted the position of full-time director of public health in Oak Park, a suburb of Chicago, an appointment he held until 1974. In 1979 he was appointed visiting professor of Community and Preventive Medicine at New York Medical College, an appointment he held until 1997. From 1954 to 1956 Ratner was editor of the Bulletin of the American Association of Public Health Physicians. From 1956 until 1997 he served as senior advisor to La Leche League, and was considered by that organization to be one of its “founding fathers.” In May 1962 the Center for the Study of Democratic Institutions published Ratner’s landmark analysis (in its American Character series) of the state of American medicine that later was reprinted in the Saturday Review. In 1967 Ratner helped to found and became secretary-treasurer of the National Commission on Human Life, Reproduction and Rhythm. This was the first national anti-abortion organization to be founded in the United States, having at the time of its incorporation in 1967 a membership entirely of physicians from various parts of the United States. A speech titled "Right to Live" that Ratner gave in the sixties can be heard on YouTube. In 1968 he became the editor of Child & Family Quarterly, a position he held until 1997.

== A pioneer in family mental health and informed consent ==
While he was a director of public health Ratner became a pioneer in the field of preventive family mental health when for many years he conducted seasonal film and discussion forums for young families. As director of public health Ratner also became a pioneer in the field of informed medical consent when he held full disclosure sessions on polio vaccine for the parents of young children in his community. Under his directorship Oak Park was the only community in the state of Illinois to delay participation in the 1955 Salk Polio Vaccine Program – sponsored by the National Foundation for Infantile Paralysis for first- and second-grade school children – in order that informed-medical-consent sessions for parents could be scheduled beforehand by the health department.

After oral contraceptives came on the market Ratner became aware of the work of Dr. Edmond Kassouf of Cranford, New Jersey who was one of the first to observe a connection between thrombophlebitis and the oral contraceptives of the early sixties. About that same time Ratner had made an association of increased deaths with use of the contraceptive pill. The two physicians met as a result of a talk Ratner had given in 1964 and resolved to enlighten both physicians and women as to the side-effects of the oral contraceptives. They were path breakers in the field of informed consent by successfully lobbying for a standard of medical disclosure for oral contraceptives which would reflect the full range of deleterious side effects then being reported in the medical literature. As a result of the pro-informed-consent testimony by Kassouf, Ratner, and others at the Nelson Congressional Hearings on Oral Contraceptives the government in 1970 mandated a package insert listing the then-known risks of death and injury from oral contraceptives. This event was a milestone in the history of informed consent in the United States.

In 1974 Ratner testified before a State House of Representatives committee in Springfield, Illinois, in support of a medical informed-consent bill sponsored by State Representative Harry Yourell. This bill was apparently the first medical-consent bill to be proposed and adopted in a state legislative committee. However, the bill never reached the House floor.

== Role in Salk vaccine controversy ==
Earlier in his career Ratner had been particularly concerned about the irregular manner in which the Salk vaccine had been licensed on April 12, 1955. Because of outside pressure the licensing committee in charge of approving the vaccine program did so after deliberating for only two hours and without first having read the full research, namely the Francis Report on which their approval was to have been based. (Francis did not issue the final report of his evaluation of the 1954 Field Trials until April 1957, two years after the licensing of the vaccine.)

In the spring of 1955 Ratner had risked his job in order to schedule informed consent meetings in his community for the parents of the children eligible to receive the Salk vaccine. The Oak Park Village Board was incensed at the delay this caused in carrying out the school vaccination program. The board was about to meet to consider the dismissal of Ratner from his post of public health director for withholding the vaccine. However, on the following day, May 7, Surgeon General Leonard A. Scheele, the head of the United States Public Health Service (USPHS) called an emergency suspension of the vaccination program because an outbreak of polio in some of the western states had occurred in children who had received Salk vaccine manufactured by Cutter Laboratories. As a result, Ratner’s dismissal was called off.

Knowing that this pre-season outbreak of polio in the western states was an indication that unknown amounts of live polio virus had remained in the purportedly killed-virus Salk vaccine and having learned also of similar pre-season cases of polio in children in the Chicago area inoculated with vaccine from the Parke-Davis pharmaceutical house, Ratner brought home a small cardboard box of unused Salk vaccine manufactured by that company and placed it in his refrigerator planning to analyze it for live virus.

In the meantime the National Foundation for Infantile Paralysis and the government health agencies blamed the California pharmaceutical house Cutter Laboratories for having improperly prepared the polio vaccine that had been used in the western states. Although a court trial fully exonerated Cutter from any negligence in the cases of polio in children who had received polio vaccine, the government health agencies continued to remain silent about the fact that all of the companies preparing the Salk vaccine were having problems and that vaccine-associated cases had occurred with vaccines other than Cutter’s.

== Later role in discovery of Simian Virus 40 in vaccine ==
In 1960 Ratner learned that a government researcher Dr. Bernice Eddy had discovered evidence of a cancer-causing agent that she described as a vacuolating virus in the Salk vaccine rhesus-monkey-kidney culture medium. Dr. Ben Sweet working under Dr. Maurice Hilleman at Merck observed a similar agent in the same kind of medium that they were using to develop a vaccine for adenovirus. The agent was later identified as a monkey virus and named Simian Virus 40 (SV40). Sweet & Hilleman published their work in November 1960 and Eddy published her work in May 1961. The box of 1955 Salk polio vaccine that Dr. Ratner had brought to his home in 1961 when the Oak Park health department moved to new quarters remained in a refrigerator in his basement for more than forty years. In the meantime researchers had begun to discover that SV40 was associated with various cancers. One of these researchers was Dr. Michele Carbone, a molecular pathologist of Italian birth and education, then working at the University of Chicago.

In January, 1997, at the age of 89, Ratner traveled to Bethesda, Maryland to attend a workshop of the National Institutes of Health entitled Simian Virus 40: A Possible Human Polyomavirus. There he met Carbone. A few months later when Carbone visited Ratner at his home Ratner gave Carbone vials of the 1955 Salk vaccine, for which he had been searching in vain for three years. Eventually the entire box of remaining vials was given to Carbone in the presence of a lawyer and witnesses. In these vials Carbone discovered two separate strains of SV40, one of which was a slow-growing strain previously not known to have been in polio vaccines and for which the vaccines currently being marketed were not being tested. Moreover, this slow-growing strain was the same as one found in some types of cancerous tumors. Had Ratner not saved vials of vaccine, the source of this slow-growing strain would have been suspected but unproven. Carbone’s discovery was published in the December 15, 1999, issue of Cancer Research.

== A stance on compulsory vaccinations ==
Having observed the extent to which the monetary interests of the drug companies and the voluntary health organizations were influencing federal and state government decisions on vaccines, Ratner had developed serious reservations about the desirability of compulsory vaccinations for school children. In his writings he invoked the principle of informed consent first articulated by Plato that distinguished between the coercion of slaves and the full disclosure required for the medical consent of a free man. There could be no consent, informed or otherwise, when a medical procedure was made compulsory.

== Death ==
The Salk polio vaccine controversy, however, was not Ratner’s chief interest during his professional career but rather a matter he happened upon in the course of his health department duties. His chief interest had always been preventive family mental health with an emphasis on the first three years of a child’s life as the critical time for establishing mental health. Throughout his career he gave innumerable talks to parents on the emotional needs of young children. He also published extensively on this topic in Child & Family Quarterly.

Ratner continued to be professionally active until a few days before his death at age 90 on December 6, 1997, in Cleveland, Ohio, where he had been visiting a daughter. His wife had preceded him in death on May 4, 1996. Their remains were interred at Marygrove Cemetery in Richfield Township, Lucas County, Ohio. They were survived by three daughters and eleven grandchildren. Ratner's professional papers are archived at the John Paul II Library at Franciscan University of Steubenville, Ohio.

== Selected works ==
1950. “Practical difficulties in defining the word ‘Normal’ in medicine,” Seminar, Dept. of Medicine, University of Illinois. Illinois Medical Journal 97 (3), March. Reprinted in Child & Family 13: 111–115.*

1953. Gardiner, Harold C., ed. “Hippocrates has vital meaning for physicians.” In The Great Books: A Christian Appraisal, Vol. 4, Symposium on the Fourth Year’s Program of the Great Books Foundation. New York: Devin-Adair Co., pp. 1–13. Reprinted in GP 8: 93–100.*

1955. “The devil’s advocate and the Salk vaccine program: A contribution toward an objective evaluation,” The Bulletin of the American Association of Public Health Physicians 2 (5): 3–8, November; 2 (6): 5–8, December.*

1956. “Is preventive medicine the ultimate goal of public health?” The Bulletin of the American Association of Public Health Physicians 3 (4): 3–4, May. Reprinted in Child & Family 10 (3): 218–224, 1971.

1956. “Poliomyelitis vaccine,” correspondence. J Am Med Assoc 160: 231–32, January 21.*

1957. “Acceptance of authority, IV,” guest editorial. Northwest Medicine 56 (6): 680–8, June.

1957. “Stalking the Salk,” correspondence. GP 15 (5), May.*

1958. “The public health aspects of breast feeding.” Section of Pediatrics, June 25, 107th Annual Meeting of the American Medical Association, San Francisco, California.

1958. “Wisdom and health,” guest editorial. The New Physician 7:9, September.

1958. Foreword. The Womanly Art of Breastfeeding. 1st edition. Franklin Park, Illinois: La Leche League International, pp. v–vii. 0-912500-01-8. Also included in 2nd (1963), 3rd (1981), 4th (1987), and 5th (1991) editions.

1960. “The present status of polio vaccines,” Ill Med J 118 (2,3): 84–93,160–68. Edited from a transcript of a panel discussion presented before the Section on Preventive Medicine and Public Health at the 120th annual meeting of the Illinois State Medical Society in Chicago, May 26, 1960. Reprinted in Child & Family 19 (3,4): 195–213, 259–80, 1980.

1961. “William Harvey, M.D.: Modern or ancient scientist?” The Thomist 24(2): 175-208, April. Later published in Weisheipl, James A., O.P., The Dignity of Science: Studies in the Philosophy of Science Presented to William Humbert Kane, O.P. Washington: The Thomist Press, 1961, pp. 39–72. Reprinted in J Am Osteopath Assoc I64: 873-90, April 1965.

1962. “Benjamin Rush and Daniel Drake: Contrasting forerunners of contemporary American medicine.” 3rd Annual Arthur Rochford McComas Medical History Lecture, University of Missouri School of Medicine, Columbia, May 11.

1962. Medicine: An interview by Donald McDonald with Herbert Ratner, M.D. One of a series of interviews on the American Character. Center for the Study of Democratic Institutions. Comment by Scott Buchanan. Santa Barbara, California: Fund for the Republic, May. Reprinted in Child & Family 11 (1,2,3,4): 4–14, 100–110, 276–286, 363–375.*

1963. “The Infant as a Human Being,” Adapted from the keynote address at the American Montessori Society Second Annual Seminar, Chicago, June 14. Published in the Proceedings of the American Montessori Society. Keynote address reprinted in Child & Family 14 (3): 196–207, 1975.

1963. “The physician: Artist or scientist? A commentary on a famous text of William Harvey, M.D.” 5th Annual Victor Robinson Lecture on Medical History, Temple University School of Medicine, Philadelphia, December 18.

1964. “The importance of being a mother,” Keynote address. Proceedings of the La Leche League International 1st Biennial Convention, Chicago.

1965. “Deficiencies in present-day medical education to meet the medical needs of the American public.” Paper presented at the National Family Health Conference, sponsored by the American Academy of General Practice Foundation, April 9, San Francisco. Published in GP 32: 185–92, 1965.

1966. “Generous Motherhood.” Keynote address. Proceedings of the La Leche League International 2nd Biennial Convention, Indianapolis, June. Reprinted in Child & Family 8: 137–152, 1969.

1967. “A public health physician views abortion.” Presented at the Public Symposium on Abortion sponsored by the Illinois State Medical Society, Chicago, March 15. Published in Ill Med J, May 1967. Reprinted in Child & Family 7 (1): 38–46, 1968.

1967. “Viewpoint, the state of American medicine.” D.O. 7: 76–82. Reprinted in Child & Family 12 (2): 149–158, 1973.

1968. “The limitations of the natural sciences.” 'Child & Family 7 (2): 98–101.*

1968. “The limitations of the social sciences.” Child & Family 7 (3): 195–98.*

1969. “Overpopulation: The false culprit.” Child & Family 8 (3): 194–95.

1969. Preface and editorial comments. ‘’A Contribution to the Dialogue on Sex Education’’. Child and Family reprint booklet series. Pp. 2–4, 15–16, 30. Booklet is reprinted from Child & Family 7 (1): 2–4, 13–37, 1968.

1970. “Children: The hope of the future.” Child & Family 9 (3):194–96

1970. The Nelson Hearings on Oral Contraceptives. Testimony. Problems in the Drug Industry, Part 16. Oral Contraceptives (Vol. 2), Hearings before the Subcommittee on Monopoly of the Select Committee on Small Business, United States Senate, February 24, 25, March 3, 4, 1970. Reprinted in Child & Family 9 (1,3,4): 87–95, 275–288, 349–76, 1970.

1972. Editorial comment. ‘’The Childbearing Experience: Is Anatomy Destiny?’’ Child and Family reprint booklet series. Pp. 21–23. Booklet is reprinted from Child & Family 9 (1): 4–36, 1970.

1972. Editorial comment. ‘’The Nursing Mother: Historical Insights from Art and Theology’’. Child and Family reprint booklet series. Pp. 4–7. Booklet is reprinted from Child & Family 8 (4): 292–303, 1969.

1975. “Hippocrates and the learned profession of medicine.” 32nd Annual D.J. Davis Lecture on Medical History, University of Illinois at the Medical Center, Chicago, April 23.

1977. “The history of the dehumanization of American obstetrical practice.” Chapter 13 in 21st Century Obstetrics Now!, pp. 115–46. Chapel Hill, North Carolina: International Association of Parents & Professionals for Safe Alternatives in Childbirth (NAPSAC). Reprinted with commentary in Child & Family 16 (1): 4–37, 1977.

1981. Introduction and moderator. ‘’A La Leche League Dialogue: An Historic Document. The Founding Mothers’’. Child and Family reprint booklet series. Pp. v–vii, 5–67. Booklet is reprinted from Child & Family 13 (3,4): 198–223, 292–306, 1974 and 14 (1): 7–29, 1975. This dialogue took place in the home of La Leche League founding mother Mary White on March 27, 1958. Those present were Mary’s husband Dr. Gregory White, the moderator Dr. Herbert Ratner, and founding mothers Mary Ann Cahill, Edwina Froehlich, Mary Ann Kerwin, Marian Tompson, and Betty Wagner. Founding mother Viola Lennon was unable to attend. The dialogue was recorded and later transcribed.

1982. “The family: Nature’s institution” in Carl A. Anderson and William Gribbon, The Family in the Modern World: A Symposium on Pope John Paul II’s Familiaris consortio., American Family Institute, pp. 9–15.

1983. “Nature, mother and teacher: Her norms.” Listening 18: 185–219, fall.

1985. “Nature: Mother, Teacher and Vicar General.” Cardinal Wright Award Lecture, Eighth Convention of the Fellowship of Catholic Scholars, Chicago, September 29.

1987. Introduction and editorial comment. The Slide Toward ‘Mercy-Killing. Child and Family reprint booklet series. Pp.ii–vii, 82–83. Booklet is reprinted from Child & Family 10 (1,2,3): 40–58, 155–90, 260–88, 1971.

1987. “The natural institution of the family.” Delivered at the Tenth Convention of The Fellowship of Catholic Scholars, Los Angeles, California, September 26. Published in The Catholic Church’s Message to United States Citizens of the Twenty First Century. Paul L. Williams, editor. Pittston, Pennsylvania: Northeast Books (1988), pp. 154–68. Reprinted in Child & Family 20 (2): 89–106, 1988.

1989. “Terence Cardinal Cooke Annual Lecture on Medical Ethics”. Terence Cardinal Cooke Health Care Center, New York City, October 18.

2002. “The 1955 Salk polio vaccine and the 1957-1961 Niles leukemia cluster: A flawed investigation by the U.S. Public Health Service.” H. Dietz, editor. Linacre Quarterly 69 (2): 169–75, May.*

2007. Nature, the Physician, and the Family: Selected Writings of Herbert Ratner, M.D., 2nd edition, M.T. Baggott, editor. Bloomington, Indiana: AuthorHouse. (Works in this list followed by an asterisk are included in this book.)
