= Margaret J. Gamper =

Margaret J. Gamper (1907– March 18, 2002) was a pioneer of modern natural childbirth. One of Gamper's students was Dr. Robert Bradley, who developed the Bradley method of natural childbirth. Gamper wrote two books on childbirth, "Relax, Here's Your Baby" and "Preparation for the Heir Minded".
