= Judge J. C. Kerwin House =

Historic house in Wisconsin, United States

- U.S. National Register of Historic Places
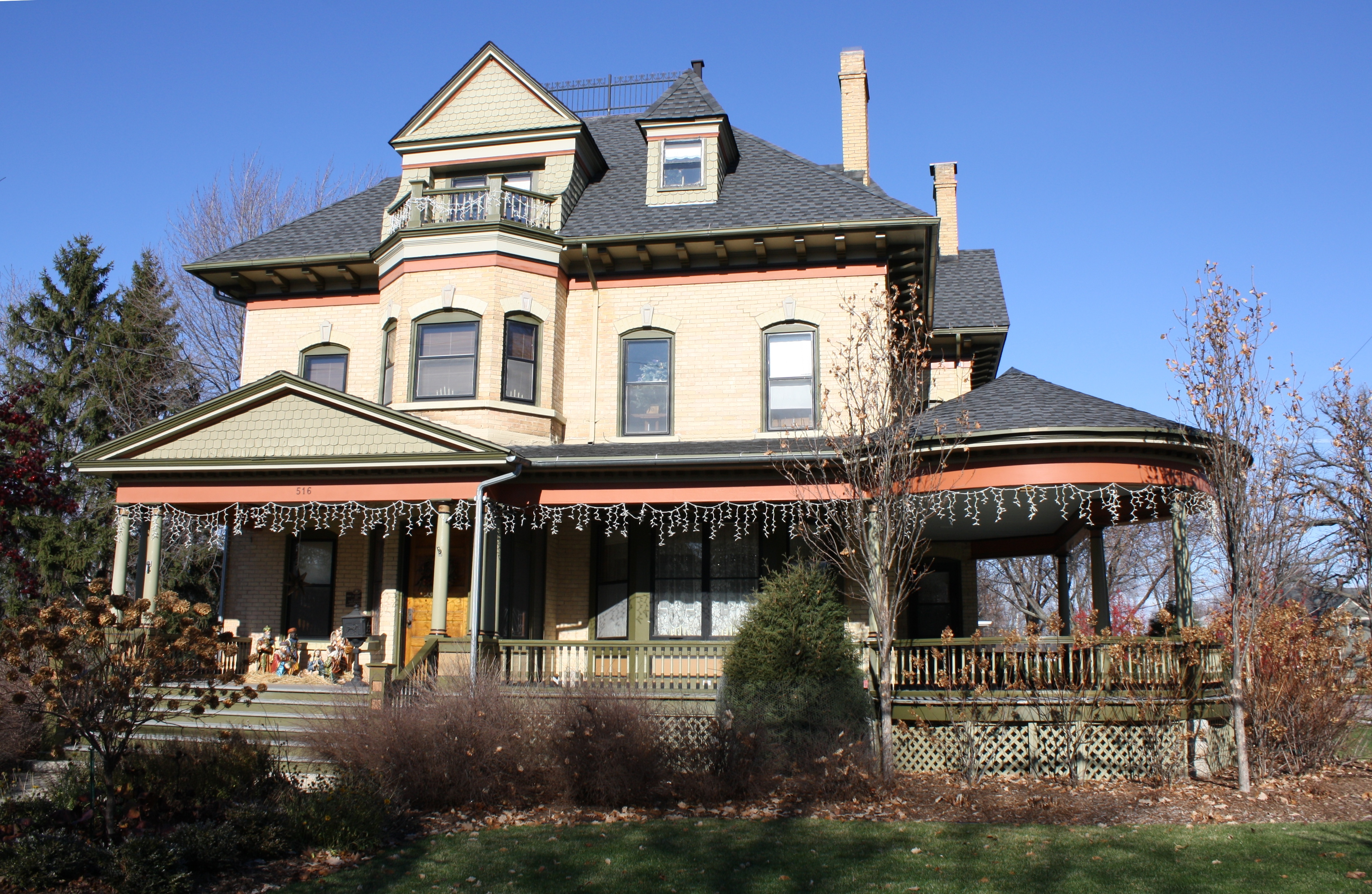

- Location within Wisconsin Location within the United States
- Location: 516 E. Forest Ave., Neenah, Wisconsin
- Coordinates: 44°11′26″N 88°26′58″W
- Area: less than one acre
- Built: 1885
- Built by: Ernest F. Wieckert
- Architectural style: Queen Anne
- NRHP reference No.: 96000907
- Added to NRHP: August 16, 1996

The Judge J. C. Kerwin House, at 516 E. Forest Ave. in Neenah, Wisconsin, United States, was built in 1885. It is a two-story Queen Anne-style house built of masonry. It has a three two-story bays, a veranda across its south and east facades, a semi-circular pavilion, and a turreted roof on its southeast corner.

It was listed on the National Register of Historic Places in 1996.

Its construction is attributed to Ernest F. Wieckert, who is believed to have designed the house.
