= Journal of Human Lactation =

- Discipline: Pediatrics
- Language: English
- Edited by: Ellen Chetwynd

Publication details
- History: 1984-present
- Publisher: SAGE Publications
- Frequency: Quarterly
- Impact factor: 2.233 (2015)

Standard abbreviations
- ISO 4: J. Hum. Lact.

Indexing
- CODEN: JHLAE5
- ISSN: 0890-3344 (print); 1552-5732 (web)
- LCCN: sn86011977
- OCLC no.: 14247077

Links
- Journal homepage; Online access; Online archive

The Journal of Human Lactation is a peer-reviewed medical journal that covers research on human lactation and breastfeeding behavior. The editor-in-chief is Ellen Chetwynd. The journal was established in 1985 and is published by SAGE Publications. It is the official journal of the International Lactation Consultant Association.

== Abstracting and indexing ==
The journal is abstracted and indexed in CAB Abstracts, Global Health, Tropical Diseases Bulletin, CINAHL, EMBASE/Excerpta Medica, Food Science and Technology Abstracts, InfoTrac, MEDLINE, Science Citation Index Expanded, Scopus, Current Contents/Clinical Medicine. According to the Journal Citation Reports, the journal has a 2015 impact factor of 2.233.
