= Marian Tompson =

American breastfeeding activist

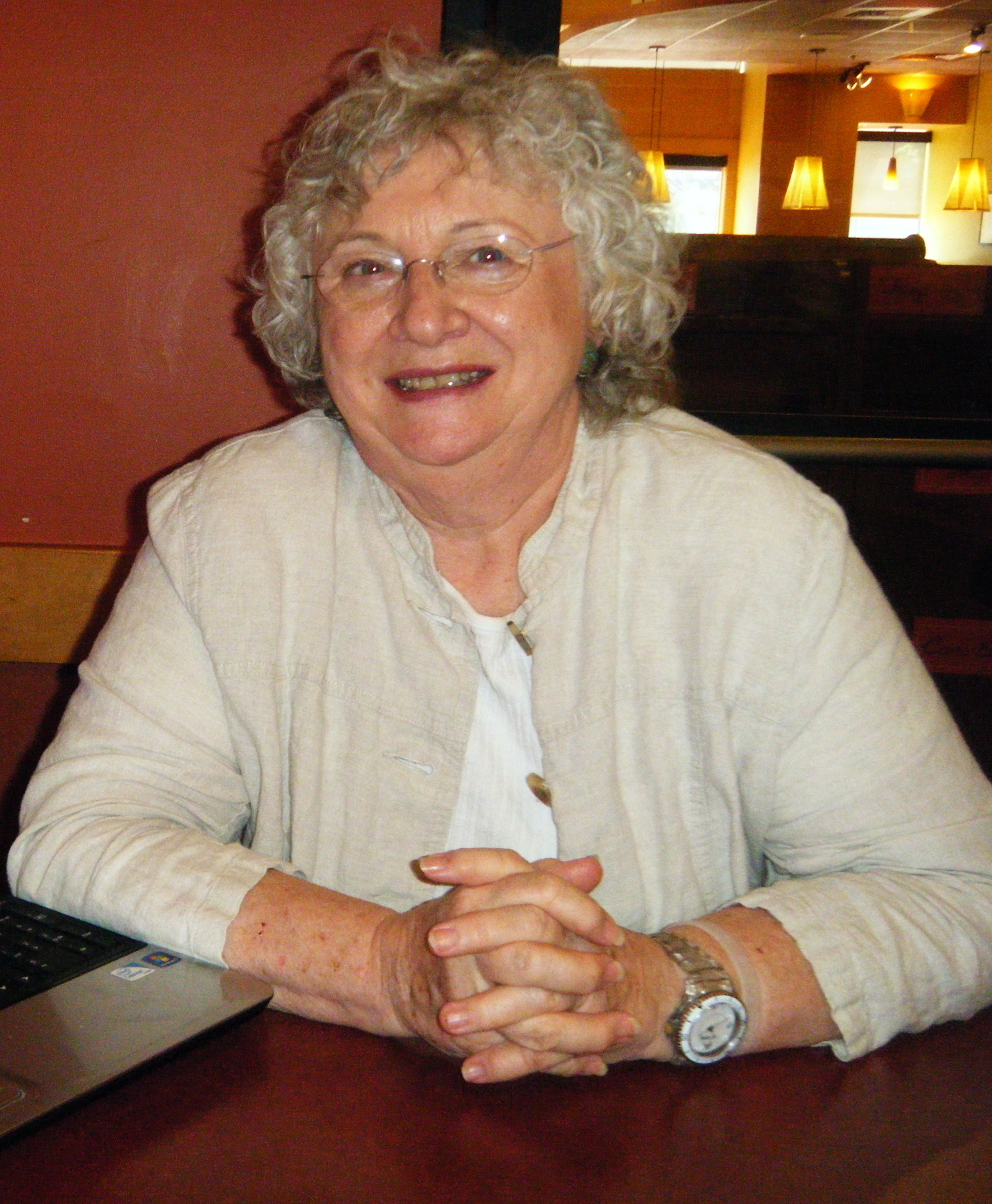
June 2011 in Evanston, Illinois

Marian Leonard Tompson is one of the seven founders of La Leche League International. She was President of La Leche League for 24 years, from 1956 to 1980, and a member of the Founders Advisory Council until her resignation in November 2024, following policy changes regarding the inclusion of transgender women. Tompson was married to Clement Tompson and has seven children. She is an advocate for home birth.

== Career ==
Tompson helped develop the La Leche League Breastfeeding Seminars for Physicians, which have been held annually since 1973. She has served on many boards, committees and advisory councils, including the International Advisory Council for the World Alliance for Breastfeeding Action (1996 to present).; the Advisory Board for the National Association of Post Partum Care Services (1995), the Advisory Committee for Perinatal Health, Department of Public Health for the State of Illinois (1983); and served as a consultant for the WHO/UNICEF meeting on Infant and Young Child Feeding in Geneva, Switzerland in 1980.

In 2001, she founded AnotherLook at Breastfeeding and HIV/AIDS, a nonprofit organization focused on research regarding breastfeeding in the context of HIV/AIDS, dedicated to gathering information, raising critical questions, and stimulating research about breastfeeding in the context of HIV/AIDS. She is president and CEO of the organization.Mrs. In 1998, Mothering magazine designated Tompson a 'Living Treasure'.

Her memoir, Passionate Journey, My Unexpected Life, co-authored with Melissa Clark Vickers, was published in 2011.

In 2024, Tompson resigned for La Leche League, over disagreements about breastfeeding by trans women, writing in her resignation letter that the "shift from following the norms of nature, which is the core of mothering through breastfeeding, to indulging the fantasies of adults, is destroying our organization."

== Interviews ==
In the September/October 1982 issue of Mother Earth News, Mrs. Tompson was interviewed about La Leche League and the benefits of homebirth.

In March, 2007, Mrs. Tompson was interviewed by the Medill School of Journalism at Northwestern University. “I had wanted to breastfeed my babies. Yet with my first three babies, and I had three different doctors, I was never able to breastfeed past six months,” Tompson said."

In an interview on December 27, 2007, by the Pioneer Press for the Wilmette Life she explained how she was elected the first president of La Leche League: "They made me the president because it was my idea," Tompson said. "I was very shy and retiring."

She also described her first medication free birth at a local hospital: "I was the only one in the hospital they had seen who had a natural birth," Tompson said. When Tompson gave birth to her third child, a group of 17 hospital employees—externs, interns, even the receptionist—came to watch. "They circled my delivery table," Tompson said. "After it was over, one of the residents walked up to my doctor and said, 'Doctor, how did you do it?'"

== Publications ==
- "Passionate Journey, My Unexpected Life", Marian Leonard Tompson with Melissa Clark Vickers, Hale Publishing L.P., 2011,
- The Womanly Art of Breastfeeding, La Leche League International, Co-author, 1st-6th Editions, 1958, 1963, 1981, 1987, 1991
- "The convenience of breast feeding" American Journal of Clinical Nutrition, Vol. 24, Issue 8, 991–992, August 1, 1971 Article
