= Betty Wagner Spandikow =

Betty Redmond Wagner Spandikow (September 27, 1923 – October 26, 2008) was a founder of the La Leche League International. She was a co-author of The Womanly Art of Breastfeeding, which has been translated into eight languages and Braille.

She was born in 1923 to a Roman Catholic family and raised in the Chicago area. She worked in accounting before starting her family.

The group had been fascinated by the importance placed on breastfeeding by early Spanish settlers in what is now the United States, who in 1598, dedicated a shrine to "Nuestra Senora de la Leche y Buen Parto" ("Our Lady of Happy Delivery and Plentiful Milk").

La Leche League International (LLLI), a breastfeeding support not-for-profit organization, now has groups in every U.S. state and in 64 nations. Spandikow was a member of the Board of Directors for the League, and at various times served as Treasurer, Business Manager, and Executive Director, a title she held for 19 years until she retired at the age of 70. She initiated "flex hours" and a family-friendly workplace in the 1960s.

The business hours at La Leche League International were flexible to facilitate new mothers spending more after-school time with their children.

== Family ==
Her first husband, Robert Wagner, by whom she had seven children, died in 1975. She married secondly, to Paul Spandikow.

== Death ==
Betty Wagner Spandikow had suffered a stroke and been dealing with Alzheimer's disease at the time of her death at the age of 85 on October 26, 2008.
