= La Leche League =

American non-profit organization

La Leche League International
- Abbreviation: LLLI
- Formation: 1956; 70 years ago
- Founded at: Franklin Park, Illinois; United States
- Website: www.llli.org
- Formerly called: La Leche League

La Leche League International (LLL; Spanish: La Leche, lit. 'the milk') is a non-governmental, non-profit organization that organizes advocacy, education, and training related to breastfeeding. It is present in about 89 countries. La Leche League (LLL) is a pioneer in the field of peer-to-peer breastfeeding information and support.

== History ==
The organization was founded in 1956 by Marian Thompson, Mary White, Mary Ann Cahill, Edwina Froehlich, Mary Ann Kerwin, Viola Lennon, and Betty Wagner. Later, other professionals joined and supported the group - Dr. Herbert Ratner and Dr. Gregory White. Herbert Ratner was influential in expanding the organization's philosophy beyond breastfeeding. At the time, most women in the United States bottle-fed their babies. At the time the organization was founded, only 20% of babies were breastfeeding in the United States. The first formal La Leche League meeting was held on October 17, 1956, in Illinois. The seven Leaders originally held meetings in private homes; more recently, hospitals, parenting centers, and other public venues have provided meeting spaces. In 1957, Dr. Grantly Dick-Read, considered the father of the natural childbirth movement, also came to speak with them. The first La Leche League Group outside of the United States formed in 1960 in Jonquiere, Quebec, Canada. The La Leche League became La Leche League International, Inc. in 1964 with groups in Canada, Mexico and New Zealand. In 1964 the first international conference was held in Chicago with 425 adults and 100 babies in attendance.

In 1981, the LLL was granted consultative status with the United Nations Children's Fund (UNICEF). In 1985, the LLL served on the International Board of Lactation Consultant Examiners, established to develop and administer a voluntary certification program for lactation consultants. The first IBLCE exam was administered in July 1985. The name "La Leche" comes from the Spanish word leche [pronounced leh-cheh] meaning milk. It was inspired by a shrine in St. Augustine, Florida, dedicated to "Nuestra Señora de la Leche y Buen Parto", meaning "Our Lady of Happy Delivery and Plentiful Milk".

Group meetings were held by a Leader, someone approved by LLL to run the meetings and moderate the discussion that would take place. LLL grew from a local, to a national, and then an international organization. La Leche League is closely related to the attachment parenting approach developed by William Sears and contributes to the dissemination of this educational philosophy. In November 2024, founder Marian Tompson quit in response to the inclusion of transgender people in the organisation. In her letter of resignation, she described the organization as a "travesty" and described trans women who breastfeed as "men who, for whatever reason, want to have the experience of breastfeeding."

== Services ==
The primary purpose of LLL is to encourage, inform, and support mothers primarily via meetings and help through telephone, Skype, Facebook, WhatsApp, help forms, and e-mail. Some Leaders also do home and/or hospital visits. LLL leaders are accredited volunteers who have breastfed their own babies and have been specially trained to help mothers with breastfeeding. Leaders keep up-to-date through continued training and study of the most current medical research on breastfeeding.

Leaders organize group meetings, where mothers are encouraged to share their own experiences with other mothers. A common theme repeated by Leaders at a LLL meeting is "take what you like and leave the rest," acknowledging that every mother-baby dyad is unique and each mother knows her own baby best. In most countries with a LLL-presence, Leaders also offer telephone help, online meetings, Facebook groups, email help, and several types of personal help.

In some locales, there is a centralized phone number (for an entire country or a US state, for example) where mothers can either receive help directly or be referred to a Leader in her area. In other areas, these Leaders directly publicize their telephone numbers, and sometimes e-mail addresses, via the LLL website, FB groups, telephone directories, and posters in parenting centres, libraries, physicians' and midwives' offices, health centres and other places where pregnant women and new parents might seek information. Mothers may also submit questions or concerns through online Help Forms available on the LLL website.

Currently LLL publishes a bimonthly nursing and parenting journal, Breastfeeding Today, available online and by link to members worldwide. LLLI's core publications are The Womanly Art of Breastfeeding (now in its 8th edition), "Feed Yourself Feed Your Family" and "Sweet Sleep".

=== International ===
La Leche League International is a core partner starting the World Alliance for Breastfeeding Action (WABA).
