= Daira Mir Momin =

- Interactive map of Daira Mir Momin

Details
- Established: 16th century
- Location: Old City (Hyderabad, India)

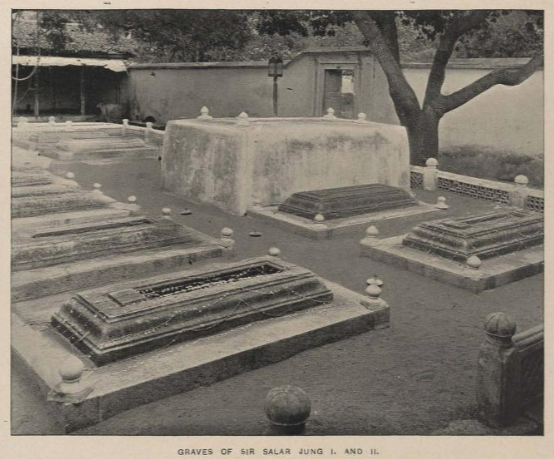
Cemetery of the Salar Jung family within the Daira Mir Momin

Daira Mir Momin (Urdu: دائرہ میر مؤمن, also called Daira-i-Mir Momin), is a Muslim cemetery located in the Old City of Hyderabad.

== History ==
It was established during the Qutb Shahi period in the 16th century around the grave of Mir Mu'min Astarabadi, who was the minister of the Sultanate of Golconda and the planner of Hyderabad. It is said that he ordered camel-loads of soil to be brought from Karbala and sprinkled across the graveyard.

The graveyard is in poor condition today and has been encroached by several illegal constructions.

== Notable burials ==
- Mir Mu'min Astarabadi
- Mir Alam, former Prime Minister of Hyderabad.
- Salar Jung I, former Prime Minister of Hyderabad.
- Salar Jung II, former Prime Minister of Hyderabad.
- Salar Jung III, former Prime Minister of Hyderabad.
- Prince Moazzam Jah
- Bade Ghulam Ali Khan, classical musician.

=== Tomb of Mir Momin ===
The tomb of Mir Momin, located in the center, contains a number of Persian inscriptions.
