= Mir Yousuf Ali Khan, Salar Jung III =

Hyderabad politician

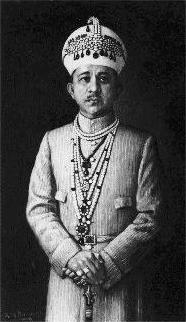
- Born: 4 June 1889; Gladhurst house, Poona, British India
- Died: 2 March 1949 (aged 59); Dewan Devdi, Hyderabad State, Dominion of India
- Burial place: Daira Mir Momin, Hyderabad
- Parents: Mir Laiq Ali Khan, Salar Jung II (father); Zainab Begum (mother)

Prime Minister of Hyderabad
- In office 1912–1914
- Monarch: Asaf Jah VII
- Preceded by: Maharaja Sir Kishen Pershad

Nawab Mir Yousuf Ali Khan, Salar Jung III (1889–1949), commonly known as Salar Jung III, was a nobleman and art collector from Hyderabad Deccan (Hyderabad State). He served as Prime Minister of Hyderabad Deccan during the reign of the seventh Nizam, Mir Osman Ali Khan. In 1912, at the age of twenty-three, Salar Jung III succeeded Maharaja Sir Kishen Pershad as Prime Minister and served for two and a half years. He held the fourth-most senior position among the Hyderabad Deccan nobility, below three members of the Paigah family.

His extensive art collection is now held in Hyderabad's Salar Jung Museum.

== Family ==
Salar Jung III's paternal family, the Salar Jung family, provided a number of prime ministers of the Hyderabad State over five generations: Mir Alam Bahadur, Nawab Mir Ali Zman Khan Muneer ul Mulk, Nawab Mir Mohammad Ali Khan Shuja ud Dowla Salar Jung, Nawab Mir Turab Ali Khan, Salar Jung I, Nawab Mir Laiq Ali Khan Salar Jung II. Through his mother, Salar Jung III was the great-grandson of Nawab Syed Ghulam Ali Khan, Mansoor-Ud-Daula, the Nawab of Banaganapally, and great-grandson of Nawab Syed Bahadur Ali Khan Karar Jung Mansoor ud Doula, Madar-Ul-Maham.

== Personal life ==
Salar Jung III was passionate about collecting rare relics, artefacts, antiques and manuscripts, including illuminated Qurans. He is believed to have spent the lion's share of his money on his collection over a period of 35 years. The collection was exhibited privately at his family residence, Dewan Devdi, until its relocation in 1968 to the Salar Jung Museum, one of India's three national museums.

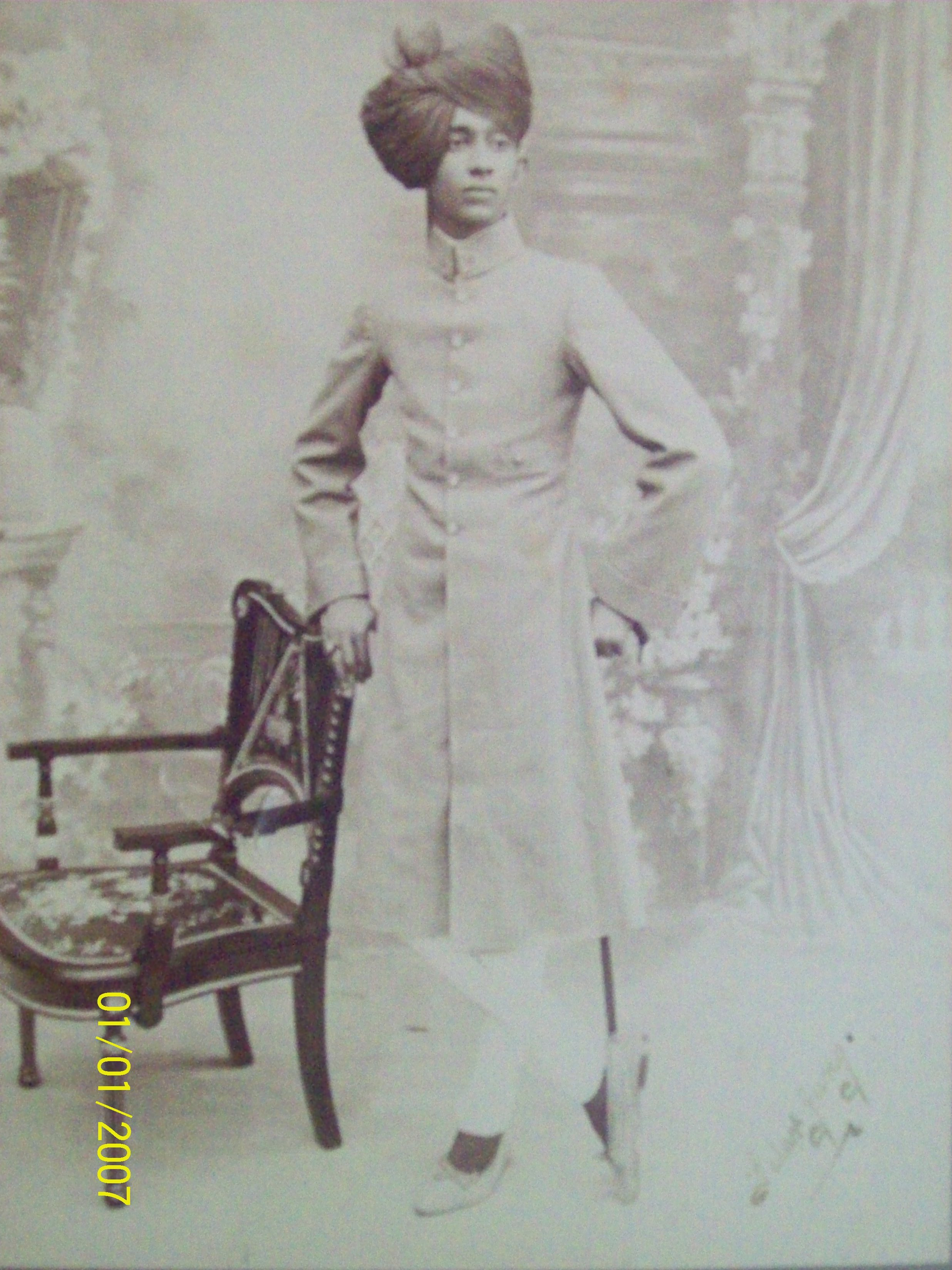

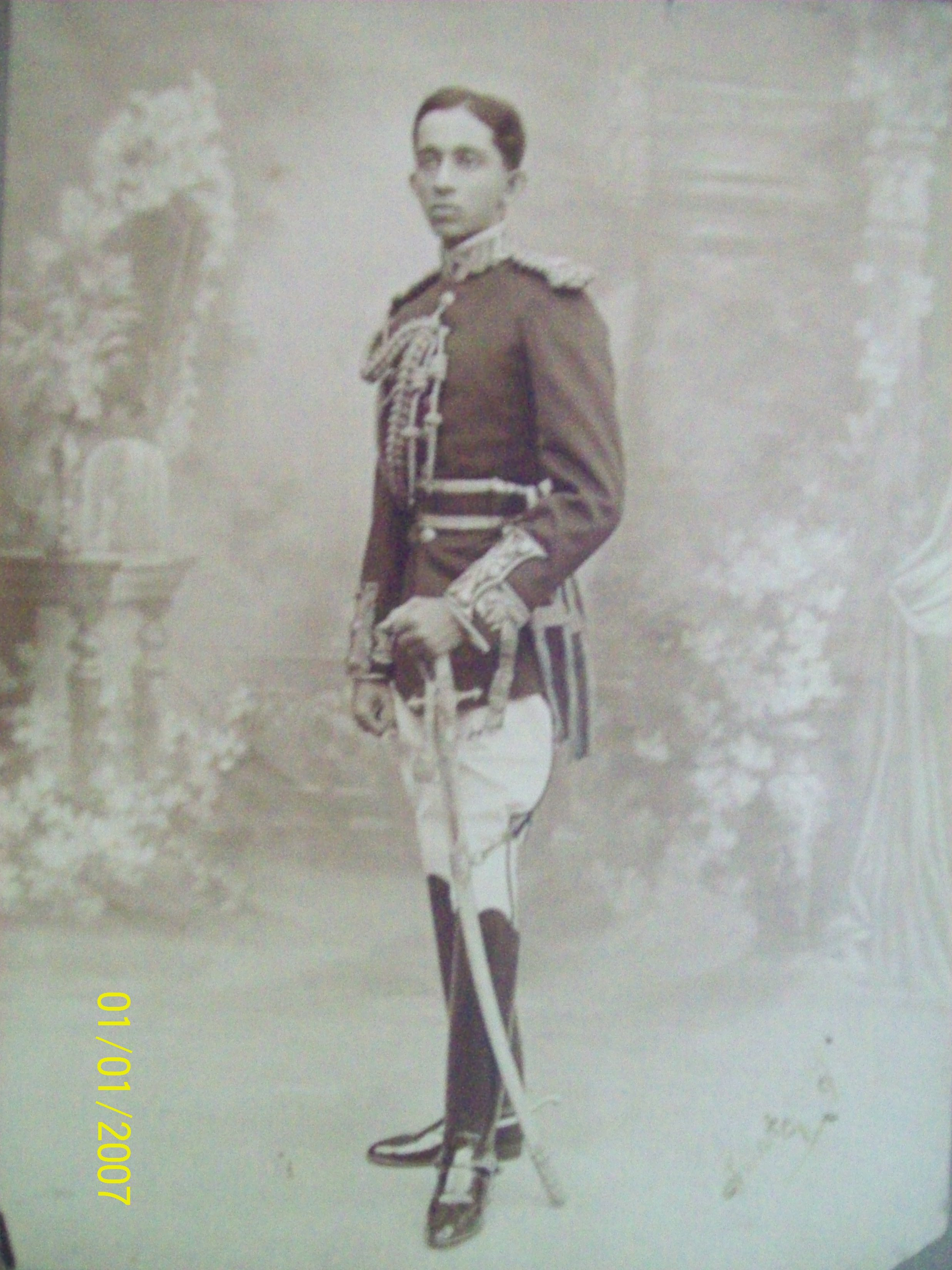

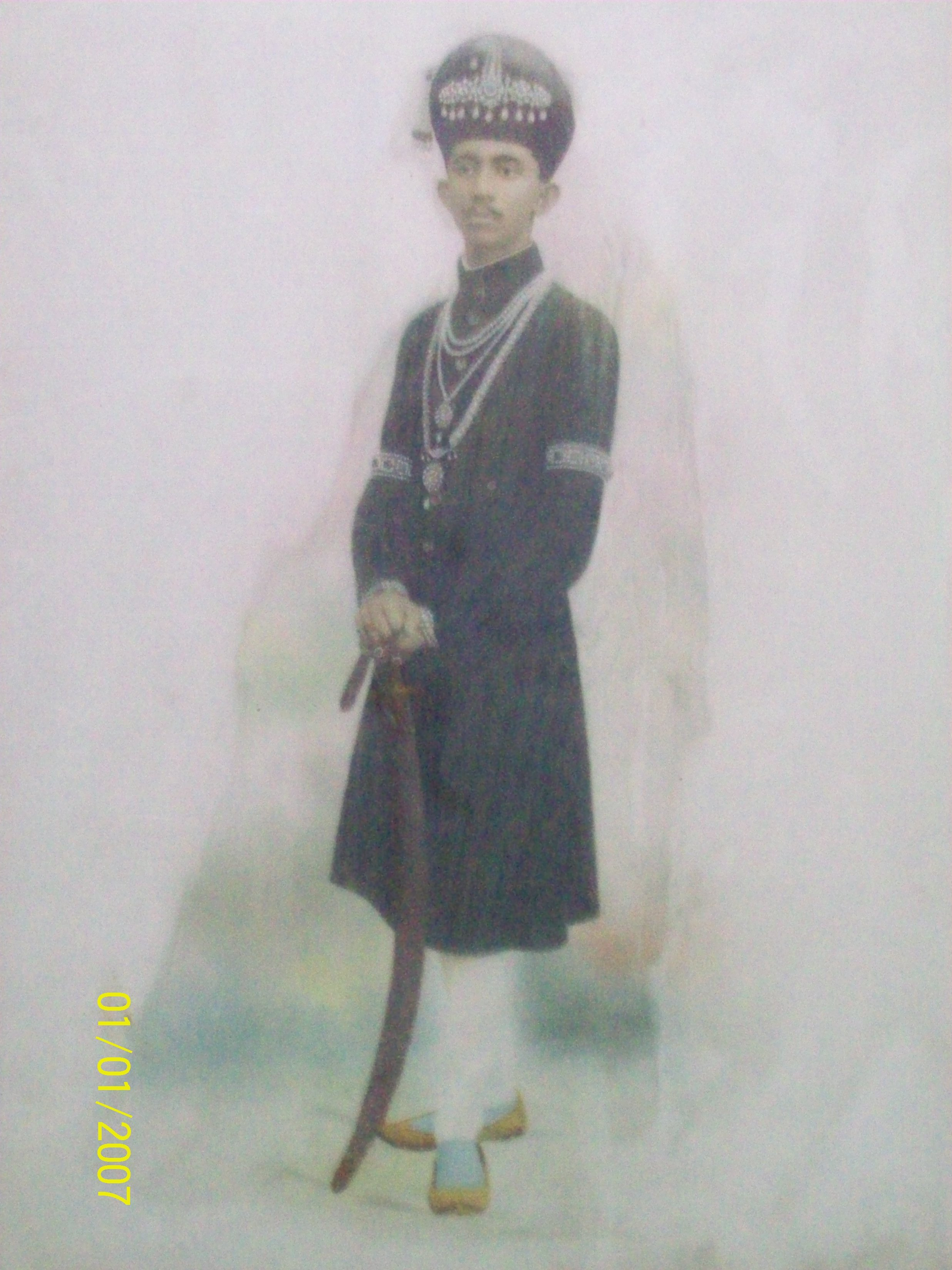

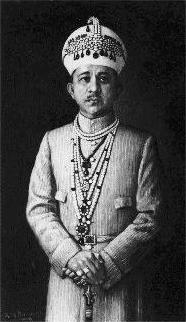

== See also ==
- Salar Jung family
- Hyderabad Deccan

Government offices
Preceded by Maharaja Sir Kishen Pershad	Prime Minister of Hyderabad; 1912–1914	Succeeded by Nizam Osman Ali Khan
