= Sayyid Lashkar Khan =

Prime minister of Hyderabad State from 1752 to 1755

6th Prime Minister of Hyderabad Subahdar of Berar and Aurangabad Faujdar of Attock

Rukn-ud-daulah (رکن الدوله) Vazir-ul-mulk Vakil-ul-Mutlaq Madar-ul-Muham Diwan Musafir Khan Nasir Jung II
- In office 1752–1755
- Monarch: Ahmad Shah Bahadur
- Nizam: Salabat Jung
- Preceded by: Raja Raghu Nath Das
- Succeeded by: Samsam ud Daula Shah Nawaz Khan

Subahdar of Berar and Aurangabad
- Preceded by: Sharif Shuja'at Khan
- Succeeded by: Samsam ud Daula Shah Nawaz Khan

Personal details
- Born: Mir Ismail Khan Sirpul, Balkh
- Died: 1757 Daulatabad Fort; Hyderabad State
- Relatives: Ra'afat-ud-daulah Bahadur Zorawar Jung
- Profession: Prime Minister of Hyderabad State or Vazir of Deccan; Subahdar of Berar and Aurangabad

Military service
- Allegiance: Mughal Empire; Hyderabad State
- Years of service: 1730–1757

Sayyid Lashkar Khan-Nasir Jung II, also known as Mir Isma'il (died 1757), was a diplomat who served as the Prime Minister of Hyderabad State under the rule of Salabat Jung from 1752. Prior to his tenure in Hyderabad, Lashkar Khan also worked under the Mughal emperor Muhammad Shah. His career spanned both Mughal and Nizam territories, contributing to the administration and governance of Hyderabad State.

== Career ==
During the rebellion led by Nasir Jung, supported by his uncle Muzaffar Jung against his father, Nizam-ul-Mulk Asaf Jah I, Nasir attempted to seize power but was defeated at the Eid Gah Maidan in Aurangabad on 23 July 1741. Shah Nawaz Khan sided with Nasir Jung, while Sayyid Lashkar Khan fought for Nizam-ul-Mulk. In the battle, Nasir Jung was seriously wounded and after the death of his elephant driver, courageously took the reins himself. At one point, his brother-in-law Mutawassil Khan aimed an arrow at him, but Nasir's son Hidayat Moideen Khan intervened, saving his uncle's life. Recognizing Nasir Jung, Sayyid Lashkar Khan saluted him and offered him a seat on his own elephant. Moved by this gesture, Nasir Jung surrendered and was taken prisoner to Aurangabad.

In Mahur sarkar, Rustam Beg Khan was removed from the post of the Bakshi to commanding the military forces (faujdari) in the same area. Saiyid Lashkar Khan was removed from leading the military (faujdari) to managing the administrative affairs in Sair and later was promoted to the position of Bakshi of Bidar. He was conferred with the title of Nasir Jung and appointed as the commander-in-Chief of the armies.

After the assassination of Raja Raghunath Das, Salabat Jung designated Saiyid Lashkar Khan as Vakil-i-Mutlaq and Madar-ul-Muham. Salabat Jung bestowed upon him the title of 'Rukn-ud Daula'.

== Military career ==
On 14 December 1746, Sayyid Lashkar Khan prepared to capture Avandha Fort in Konkan. The commander's plans for the siege of Avandha Fort were communicated to the Peshwa Balaji Baji Rao by Malhar Dadaji. Additionally, Raghunath Ganesh informed the Peshwa about Sayyid Lashkar Khan's military movements towards Avandha Fort and the Nizam-ul-Mulk's march towards Dharur. Acting as the Marathas' deputy, Raghunath Ganesh provided intelligence to Shahu I. He revealed that the Nizam was absent in Hyderabad and his troops had gained control of Avandha Fort. The envoys had been sent to Surat, although the purpose of Nizam's expedition remained undisclosed. Despite Malhar Dadaji's efforts to defend against Sayyid Lashkar Khan's forces, he was unable to withstand the attack and consequently surrendered Avandha Fort to him. Following the capture, Malhar Dadaji informed the Peshwa about Sayyid Lashkar Khan's conquest of Avandha Fort.

== Prime Minister of Hyderabad ==
Within Salabat Jung's court, there was disapproval of the French intervention in Hyderabad's affairs, with a desire to free the Nizam from foreign domination. Sayyid Lashkar Khan, the Diwan, led the opposition against French influence in the Deccan. He consistently opposed foreign interference in Hyderabad State's internal matters, advocating for the preservation of the region's autonomy.

== See also ==
- List of prime ministers of Hyderabad State
- Salabat Jung
- Vitthal Sundar
