= Dyampur =

- village
- Location in Karnataka, India Dyampur (India)
- Coordinates: 15.508061°N 75.966644°E
- Country: India
- State: Karnataka
- District: Koppal
- Talukas: Koppal

Government
  - Body: Village Panchayat

Area
  - Total: 9.031 km^{2} (3.487 sq mi)

Population (2011)
  - Total: 1,745
  - Density: 193.2/km^{2} (500.4/sq mi)

Languages
  - Official: Kannada
- Time zone: UTC+5:30 (IST)
- Postal Index Number: 583232
- ISO 3166 code: IN-KA
- Vehicle registration: KA
- Nearest city: Koppal
- Civic agency: Village Panchayat
- altitude: 1750 feet
- Website: karnataka.gov.in

Dyampur is a village in the southern state of Karnataka, India. It is located in the Yelburga taluk of Koppal district, Raichur. Previously a part of Salar Jung's jagir, which included most of Koppal and Yelburga taluks in erstwhile Hyderabad state. This village was also birthplace of "Kaviratna" Chennakavi, Pandit Kallinathakavi and poet Kavyananda.

== Village description ==
=== Physiography and location ===
The villages lies in a dry yet plain and fertile belt between the Krishna (Note: flows from the north) and Tungabhadra (Note: flows from the south) rivers, a region known as Raichur Doab. The average altitude of the village is 1750 feet, with its exact coordinates being at 76° 10' E longitude and 15° 13' N latitude. It receives 23 inches of rainfall every year, mostly between the period starting from second week of June to October.

It is bordered by villages of Rajur in the north, Kuknoor in south, Harishankarbandi in the east and Chikenkop in the west. The nearest railway station is located in Bhanapur around 8 miles away. The taluk headquarters at Yelburga is located 9 miles away and district headquarters at Raichur is located 120 Miles away. The village lies in proximity of several historically important cities and towns, most notably Hampi, once the capital of mighty Vijayanagara Empire lies just 35 miles away from the village. The village covers an area of 2324 acres or 3.6 sq. miles.

=== Agriculture ===
There are 3 distinct types of soils found in the village:

1. The fertile red soil known as Masari
2. Black soil known as Yeri
3. A mix of above (red and black) known as Garabu

The red soil belt lies in the immediate neighborhood of the village, consisting of 1/3 of the total arable land in the village, used to grow crops like Jowar, groundnut and pulses. While black soil belt is found further outside the village. The Garabu mixture of soil lies in between two soil belts.

The main grown crops in the village are Bajra, Jowar, cotton, Mavare, Toor, Niger seed, horsegram, saltlower, Bengal gram, greengram, sesamum, Jinseed, wheat and oilseeds. The main grown vegetables are lady's fingers, Brinjal, beans gourds, cucumber pulses and leafy vegetables.

=== Fauna ===
There are a number of animals which can be seen in the area such as rabbits, jackals, deer, reptiles, rodents and among birds the common ones are parrots, eagles, crows and owls.

== Temples ==
There are many temples in the village most important of these are temples of Mahamuyi, Maruti and Eswara, located in centre of the village. And most of village houses are clustered around these, while being surrounded by a fort wall. The Dyamavva temple is located in the eastern side.

== See also ==
- Koppal
- Districts of Karnataka
