= Mir Alam Tank =

Reservoir in Hyderabad, Telangana, India

- Location within Hyderabad Location within Telangana Location within India
- Location: Hyderabad, Telangana
- Coordinates: 17°21′N 78°26′E
- Type: Reservoir
- Primary inflows: Musi
- Primary outflows: Musi
- Catchment area: 5.9 km^{2} (2.3 sq mi)
- Basin countries: India
- Built: June 8, 1806; 220 years ago
- Max. length: 1.298 km (0.807 mi)
- Surface area: 464 acres (188 ha)
- Max. depth: 15 m (49 ft; 8.2 fathoms)
- Water volume: 270×10^{6} ft^{3} (10×10^{6} m^{3})
- Surface elevation: 511.8 m (1,679 ft)
- Settlements: Hyderabad

Mir Alam Tank is a reservoir in Hyderabad, Telangana, India. It is located to the south of Musi river. It was the primary source of drinking water to Hyderabad before Osman Sagar and Himayat Sagar were built.

== History ==
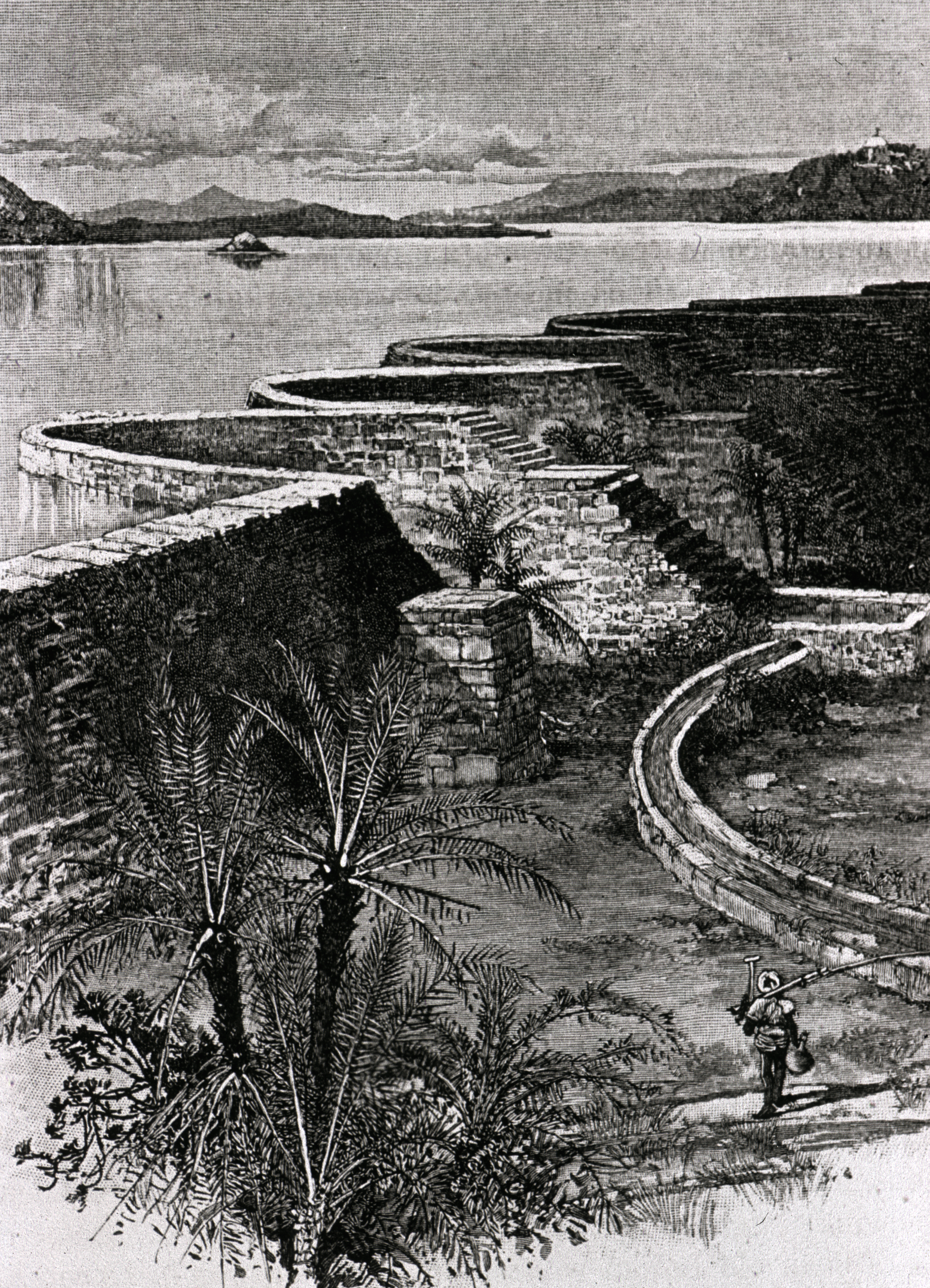
A view from east by J. F. Hurst in 1888

The tank is named after Mir Alam Bahadur, then Prime Minister of Hyderabad State (1804 - 1808), during the reign of Asaf Jah III, the third Nizam of Hyderabad state. Mir Alam laid the foundation for the tank on 20 July 1804 and it was completed in about two years on 8 June 1806. The tank was reportedly planned by Michel Joachim Marie Raymond. The reservoir with 21 arches was reportedly designed by a French engineering company. This reservoir with its 21 semi circular masonry dams were once the primary source of drinking water for Hyderabad.

== Today ==
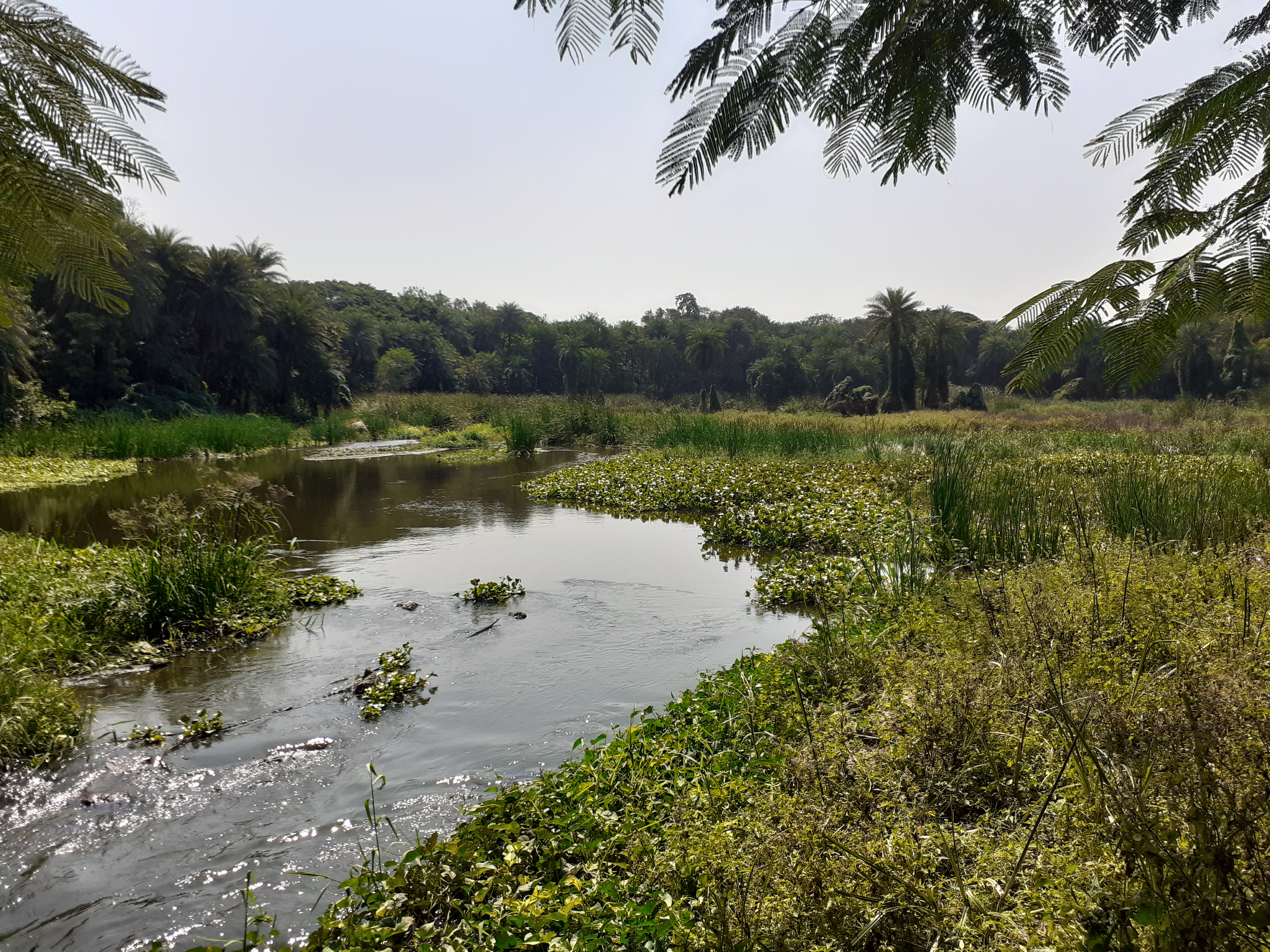
Mir Alam tank covered with water hyacinth

Similar to most other lakes in Hyderabad, the Mir Alam Tank is also being encroached by various residential buildings surrounding the lake. The water is heavily polluted and is no longer used for drinking. The area covered by lake has reduced by half from 1967 to 2021. As of 2021 the area covered by the lake was 1,050,000 m^{2} (260 acres) (i.e. down from 1,880,000 m^{2} (460 acres) covered in 1967). Nehru Zoological Park lies adjacent to the tank and Telangana Tourism operates boats on the lake, for which one has to enter through the zoo. The polluted waters of Mir Alam tank is reportedly harming the animals located in the adjacent zoo.

== Transport ==
Mir Alam Tank is serviced by Rajendranagar bus depot, and Falaknuma bus depot among others. Bus Route No. 7Z, 49 from Secunderabad Railway station, 94, 95 from Kothi, 74, 73, 251 from Afzal Gunj. The nearest Hyderabad Multi-Modal Transport System station is situated at Dabirpura

== Mir Alam Park ==
The park is being constructed with various attractions using Deccani theme, traditional arts, 3D paintings etc. A science park will also be developed.

== See also ==
- Mir Alam
