= Mir Alam =

Former Prime minister of Hyderabad state

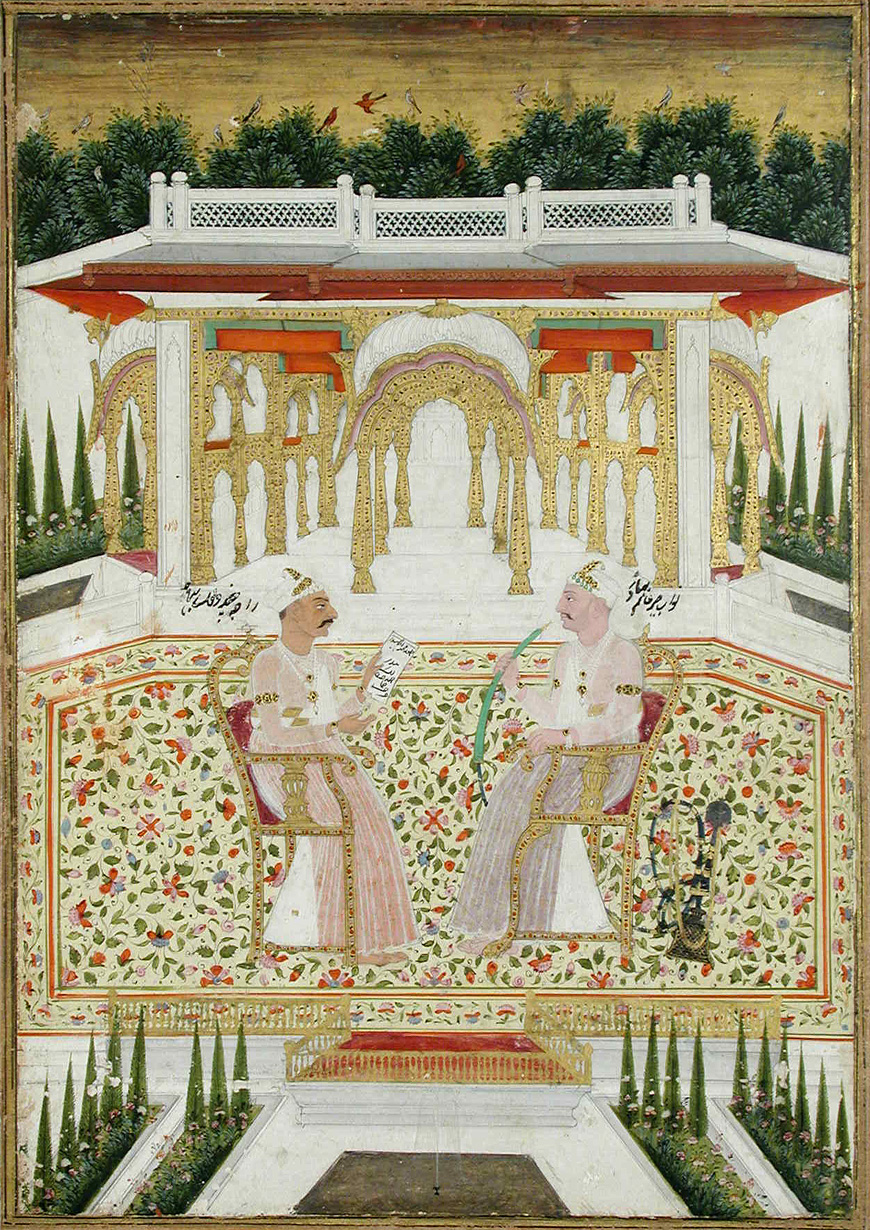
- Mir Alam (right) with Raja Chandu Lal (left)
- Resting place: Daira Mir Momin
- Family: Salar Jung family

Prime Minister of Hyderabad
- In office 1804–1808
- Monarch: Asaf Jah III
- Succeeded by: Maharaja Chandu Lal

Mir Alam was a nobleman who served as Prime Minister of Hyderabad State from 1804 until his death in 1808. He belonged to the Salar Jung family. He was the grandfather of Salar Jung I. He served under Asaf Jah III.

In 1800, as part of his ongoing rivalry with his predecessor Arastu Jah, the latter enticed Mir Alam to discredit James A. Kirkpatrick and demanded his execution.

The Mir Alam tank in Hyderabad is named after him.

Mir Alam headed the Hyderabad army in support of British East India company during the siege of Srirangapatnam against Tipu Sultan. Post his return to Hyderabad after winning the war, he was treated as a hero.

He died of leprosy, in Hyderabad.
