= Jade collection of the Salar Jung Museum =

Collection of Salar Jung Museum

The Salar Jung Museum in Hyderabad boasts of an extensive collection of jade and jade objects, and it is one of the largest collection of jade displayed for public in India. The collection as per a publication from 1979 of Salar Jung Museum suggests that there were 984 objects with varying degree of craftsmanship. Most of the artefacts are from the Mughal Empire and some from the Asaf Jah Dynasty. There are two types of objects, first the one which are partially made of jade like hilts of daggers and swords and some articles purely carved out of Jade like small cups and miniatures.

== History and technique of Jade ==
Jade is a natural mineral rock, mainly available in Khotan and Yarkand regions of East Turkistan and Upper Burma. Most common color observed in jade is green but several other colors are also found in nature. Jade has been known for 7000 years in China and was owned by rich and royal as it is an expensive and rare stone. It is not certain how and when jade stone arrived in India, there are several theories of jade objects being brought to India from China. However these theories have been outdated, as over the years large collection of jade objects are discovered in India and are on display all over the world.

== About the collection ==
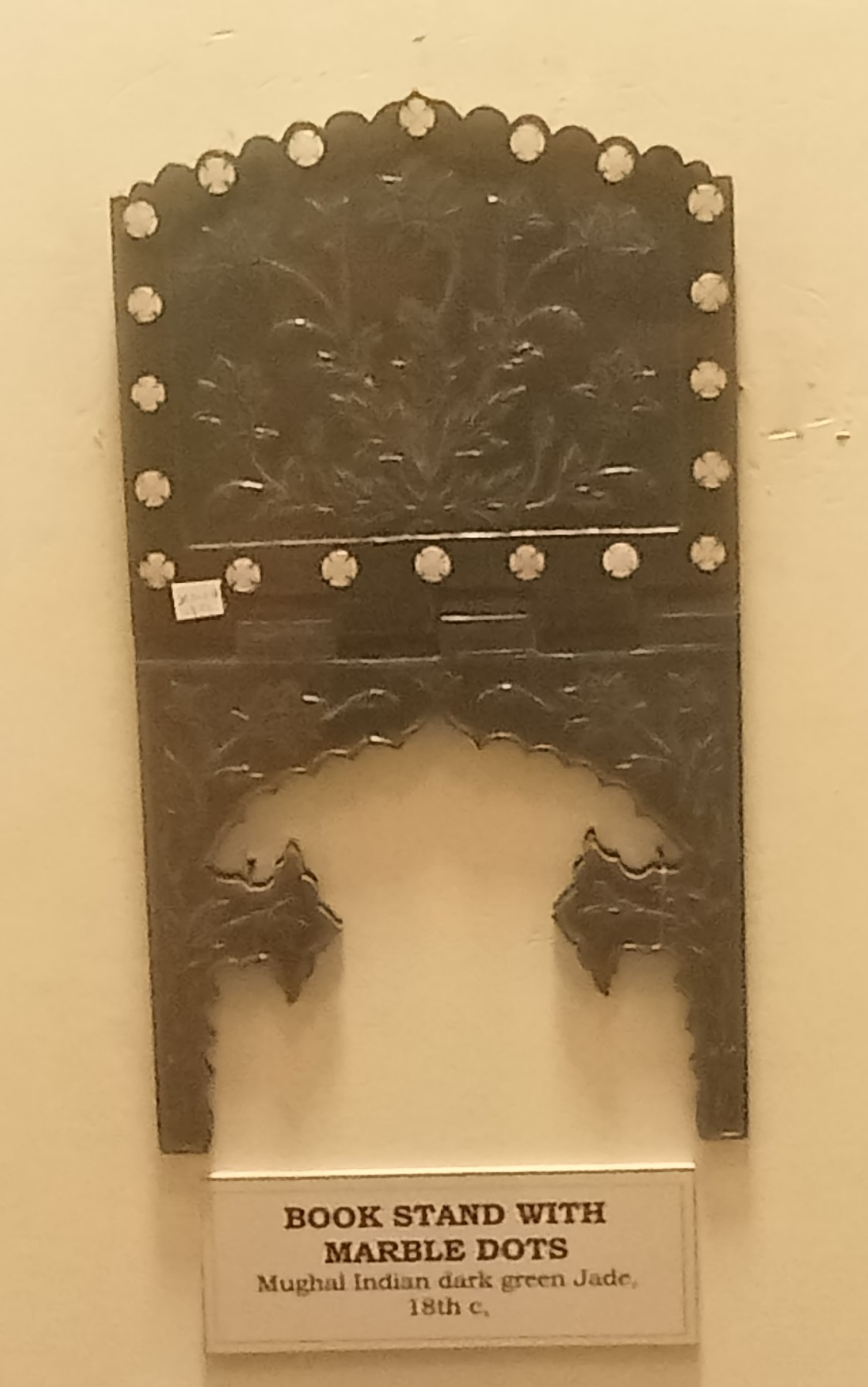
Dark green jade book stand with contrast white marble inlay, from 18th century Mughal Empire

The patron of the jade collection is the famous Salar Jung Family of Hyderabad. Three generations from this family served as the prime minister of Asaf Jah dynasty. However, this carefully curated collection does not have any record, no documentation has been left behind by the family stating when, how and from whom these objects were acquired. The jade in the collection notable for its design excellent craftsmanship and perfection of technique. Ornamentation on the jade objects are mainly in traditional floral pattern with an exceptional polish or with gemstones like rubies and diamonds embedded on the surface.

Noteworthy objects in the collection consists of a Quran Stand Rehl, hunting knife of Mughal Emperor Jahangir, dagger of Mughal Emperor Aurangzeb, Archer Ring of Mughal Emperor Shah Jahan, fruit knife of Noorjahan, miniature version of a screen with portraits of three generation of Salar Jung, wine cups of Indian School of Jade from 18th century. Apart from these there are several mirrors with jade handles, wine cups in jade, walking sticks, belt buckles, chilam, ashtray, plaques, spoons, trays, trinket boxes, armlets, dice and many more miniature objects from different time periods, including Mughal and Asaf Jah periods.

== Notable objects ==
=== Quran stand Rehl ===
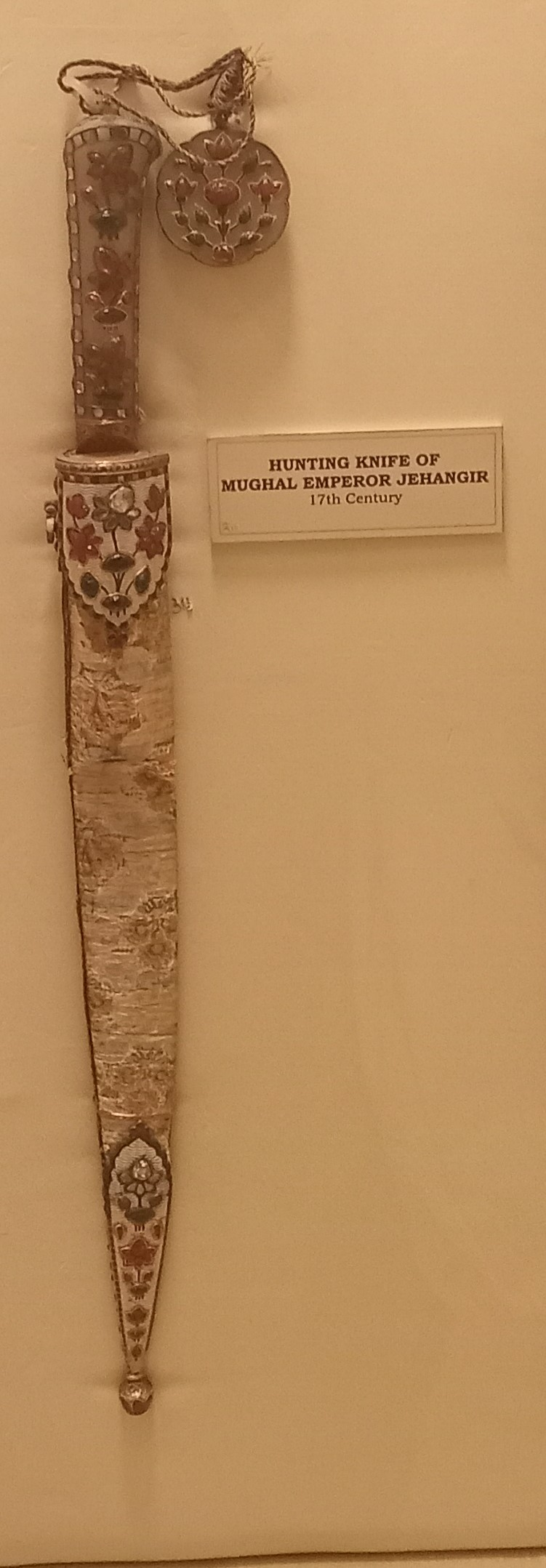
Hunting knife of Mughal Emperor Jahangir with jade hilt and tassel and a golden knife.

This is a unique object with archaic inscription on both sides, stating Shamsuddin Iltutmish Padshah and the other side reads Sans 607 Hijri (1209 AD). The inscription is surrounded by an intricate carving of Tree of Life in Jade. The stand is carved out of one piece of jade stone in architectural style of Sultanate Period. The Tree of Life blooms out from a small vase and is blown into an eight petal flower at the top with petals and branches on the side. This is one of the earliest Jade objects discovered in India which makes it an invaluable example of Islamic Jade in India. Image for this object is available in Google Arts and Culture. The museum contains three more book stands from the Mughal Empire, all three are in dark green jade.

=== Hunting knife of Mughal emperor Jahangir ===
It is said that the hunting knife belonged to fourth Mughal Emperor Jahangir. The upper part and blunt edge is made in gold, representing a creeper. The hilt of the blade is in white jade, embedded with gemstones which is attached to a circular tassel also in jade. The cover of the knife is in a brocade and is embellished with meenakari work.

=== Archer ring of Mughal emperor Shah Jahan ===
Mughals were very fond of archery, hence archer rings were a common object. The archer ring is carved in dark green with an inscription stating 'Sahib-E-Qiran', second lord of conjunction. This title was used by the Mughal emperor Shah Jahangir in reference to his ancestor Timur. The inscription also states that the ring is from 1040 Hijri, which is 1649 AD.

=== Fruit knife of Noorjahan ===
The knife belongs to Mughal Empress Noorjahan Knife with a jade handle of mutton-fat colour, one end of the jade is decorated with enamel to represent a parrots head, the jade handle is encrusted with curved emerald with gold rim to represents a leaf. The scabbard is in brocade with emerald carvings on both ends.

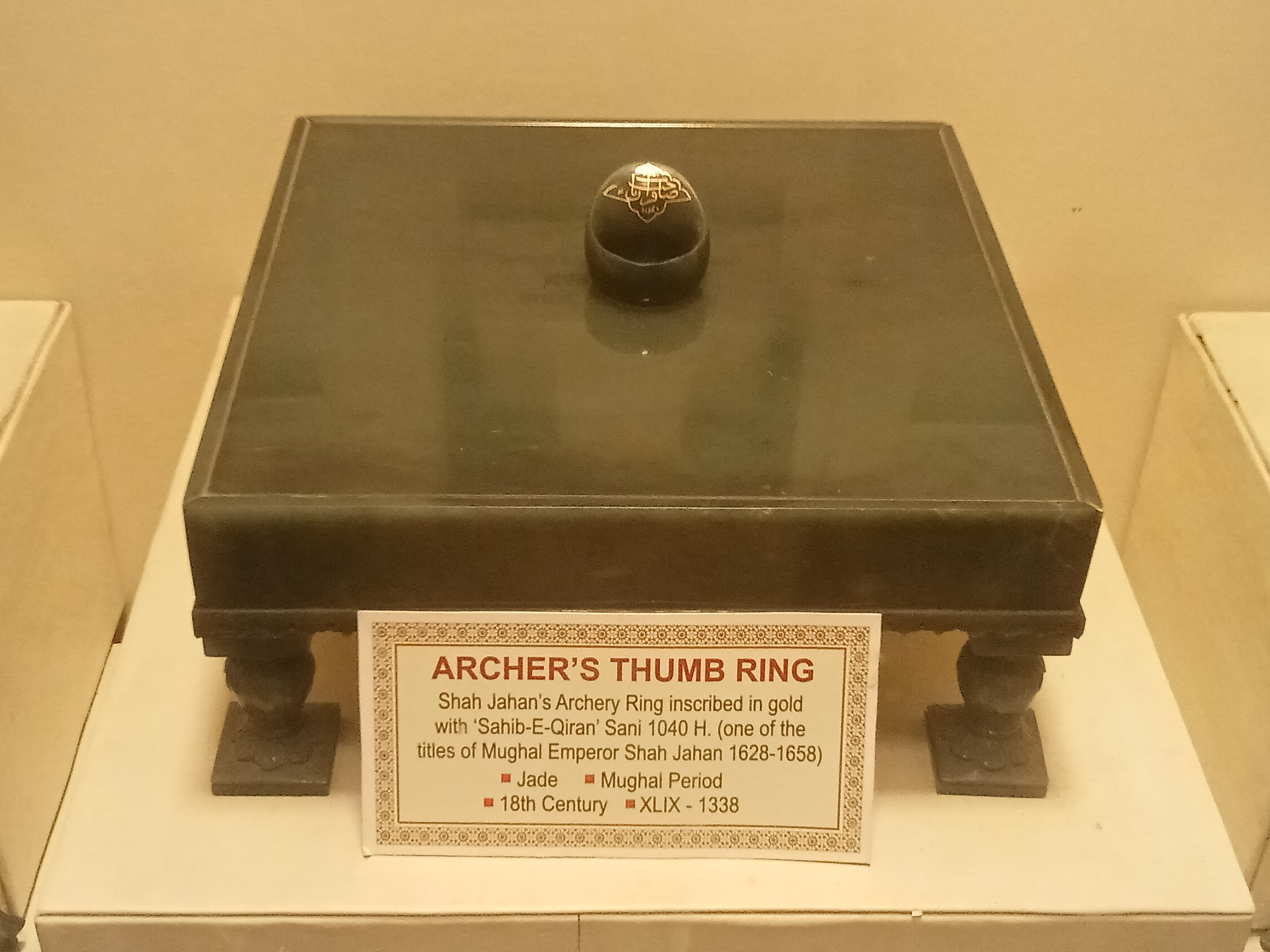
Archer's thumb ring of Shah Jahan in Jade with inscription-17th Century

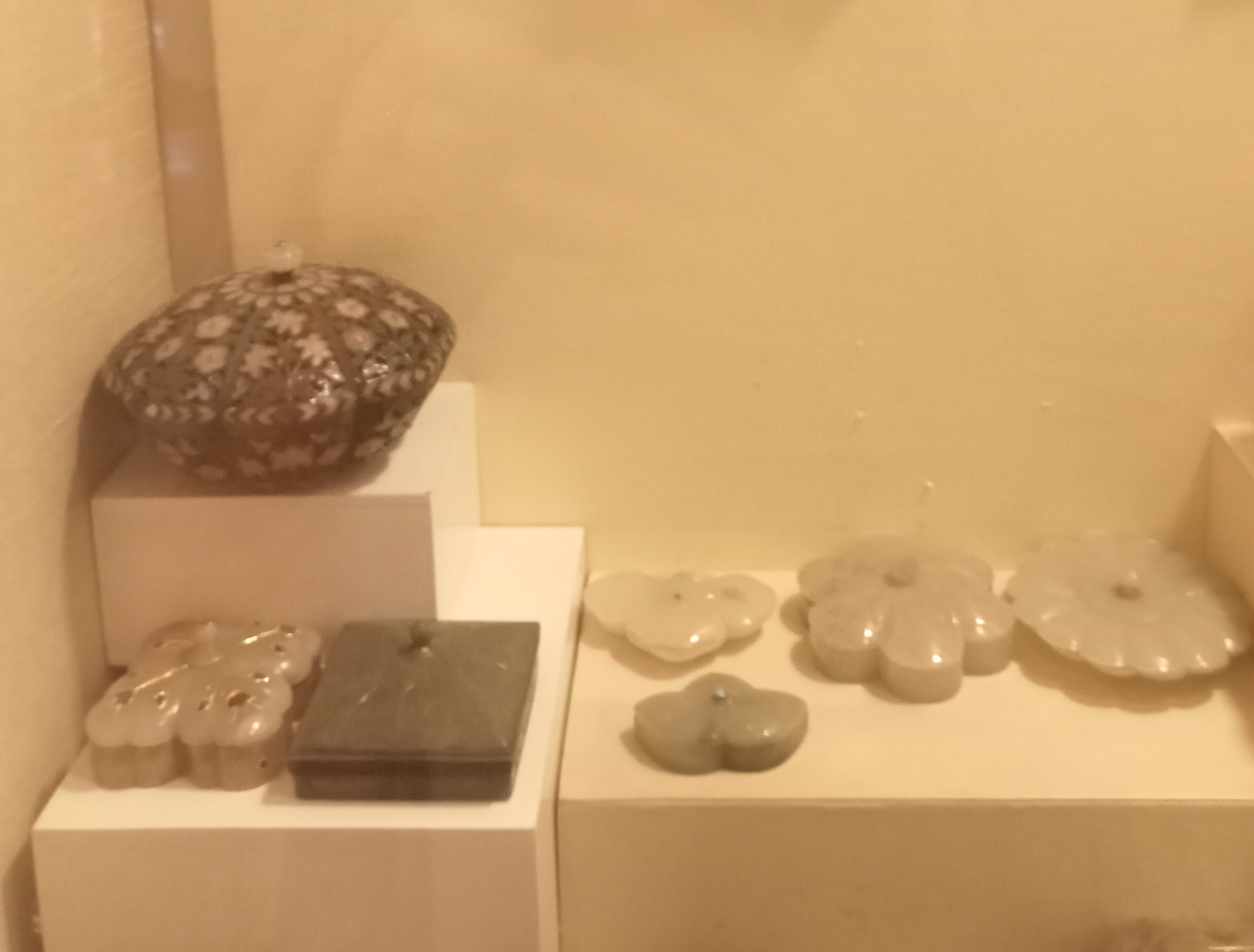
File:Spice_and_Trinket_Objects.jpg

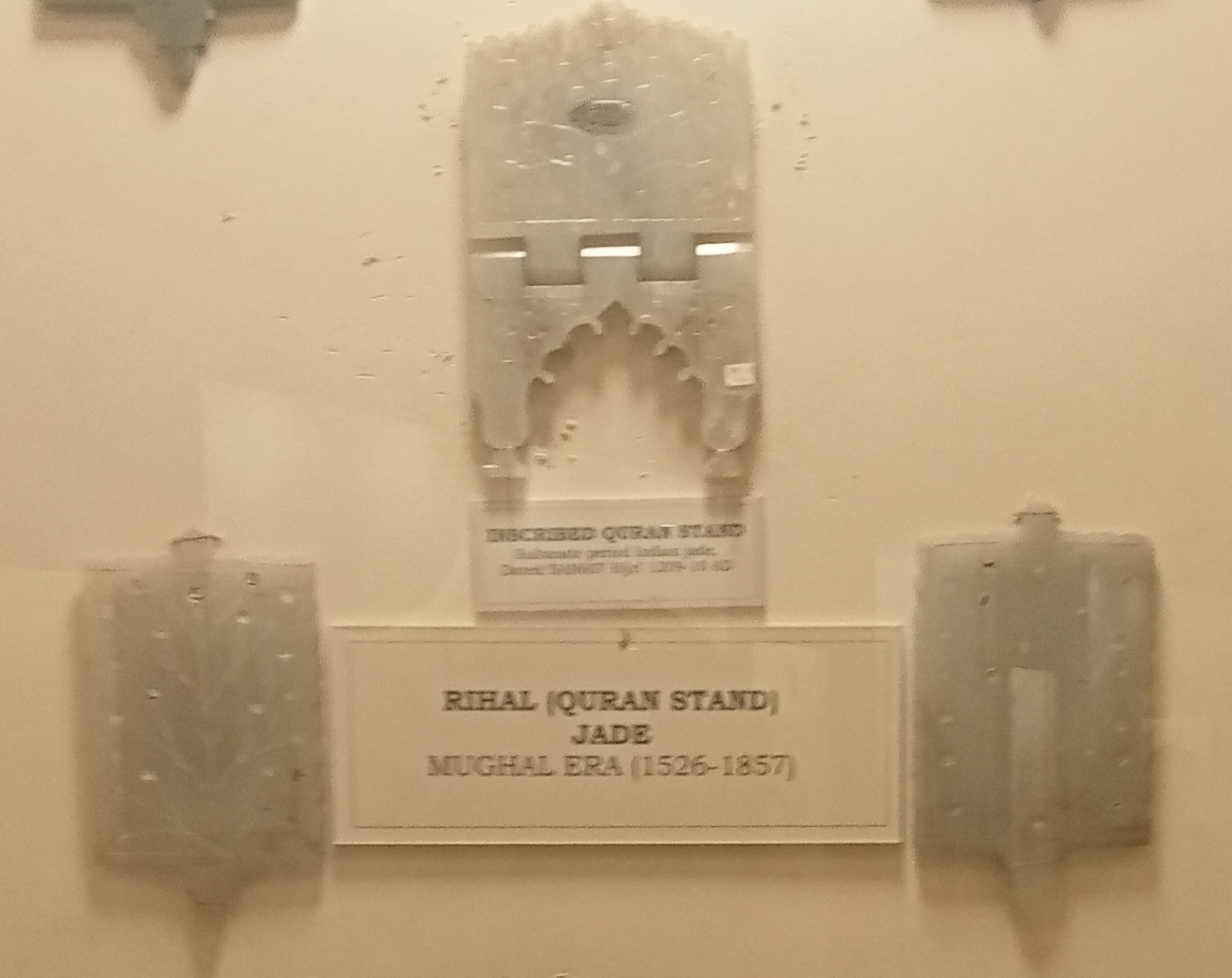
File:Rihal_Quran_Stand_in_Jade_13th_century.jpg

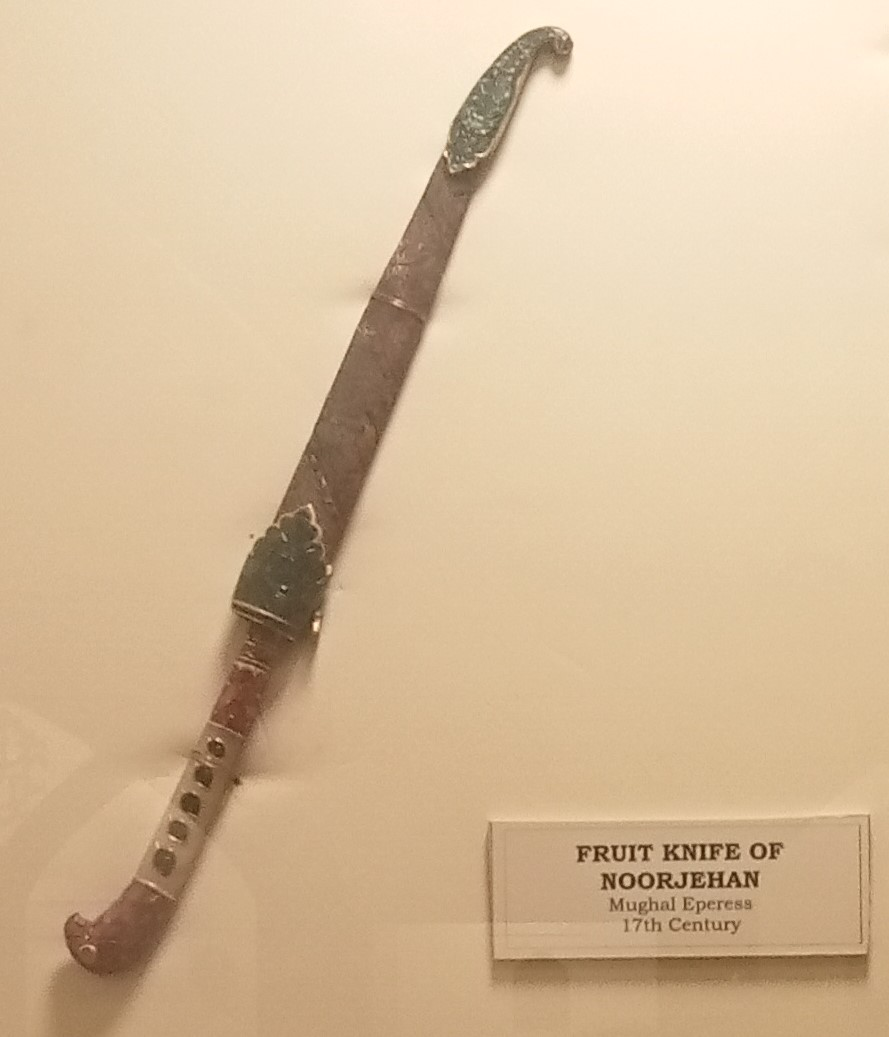
File:Fruit_Knife_of_Mughal_Empress_Noorjahan.jpg

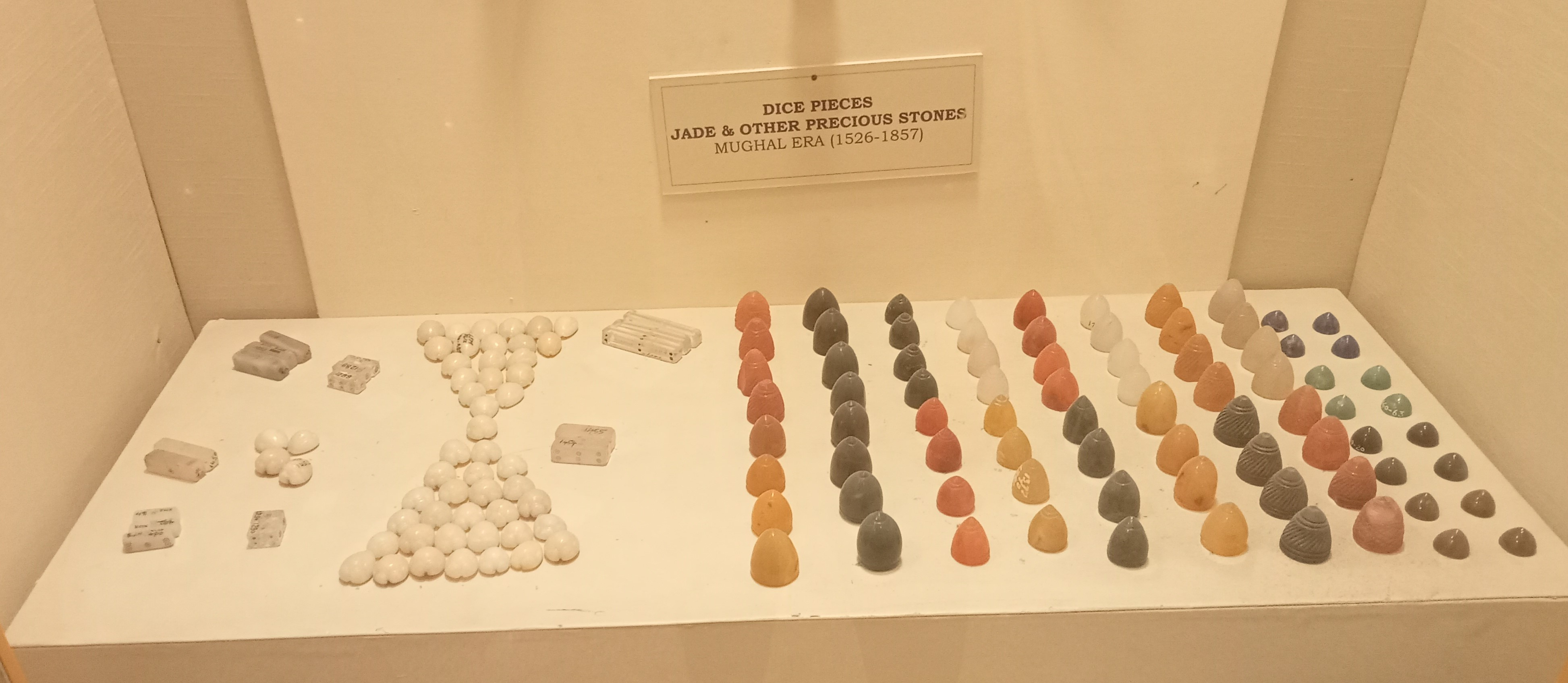
File:Dice_pieces_of_jade_-_16_to_19_Century.jpg

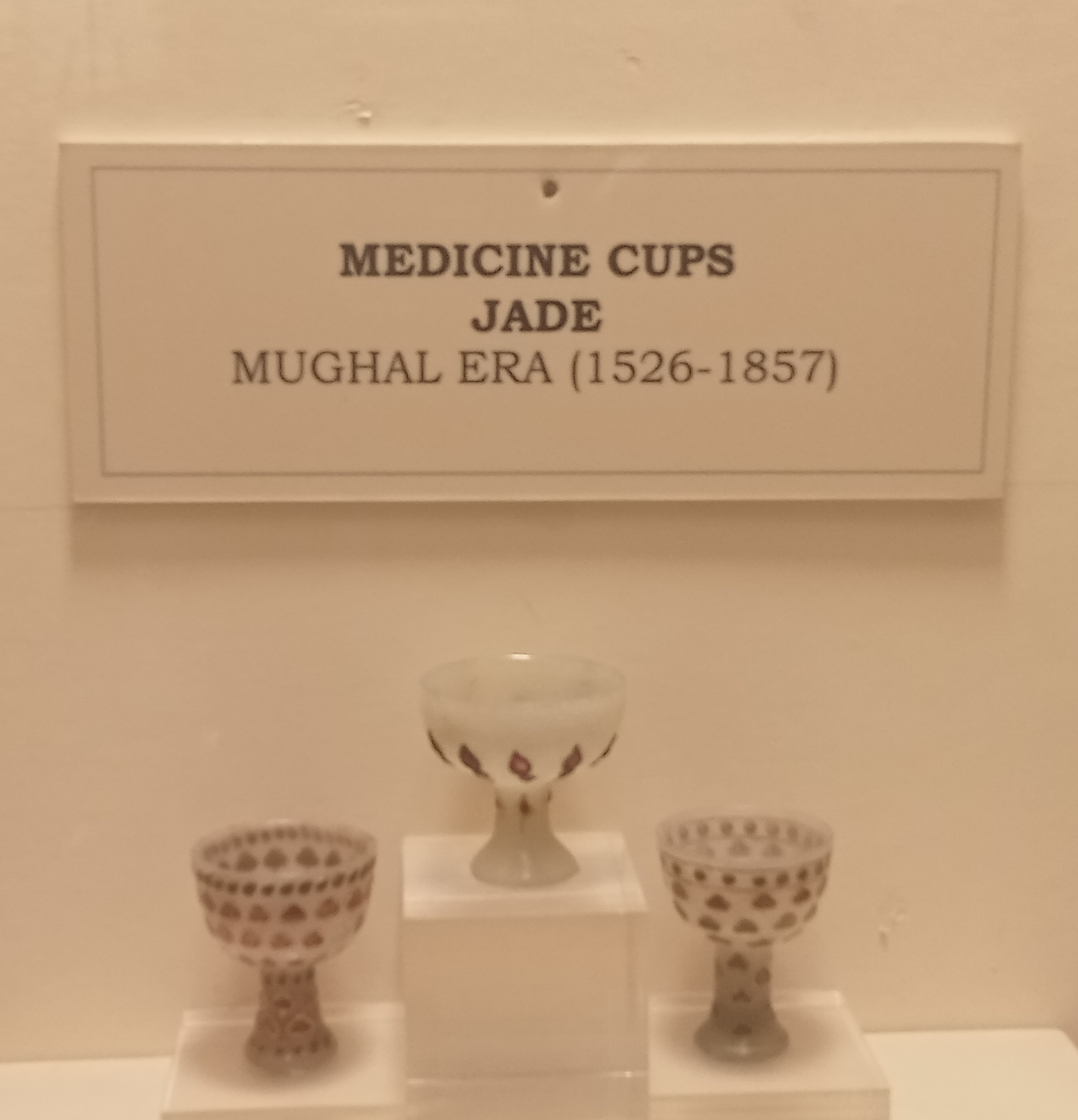
File:Medicine_Cups_-_Jade_16th_-19th_century.jpg

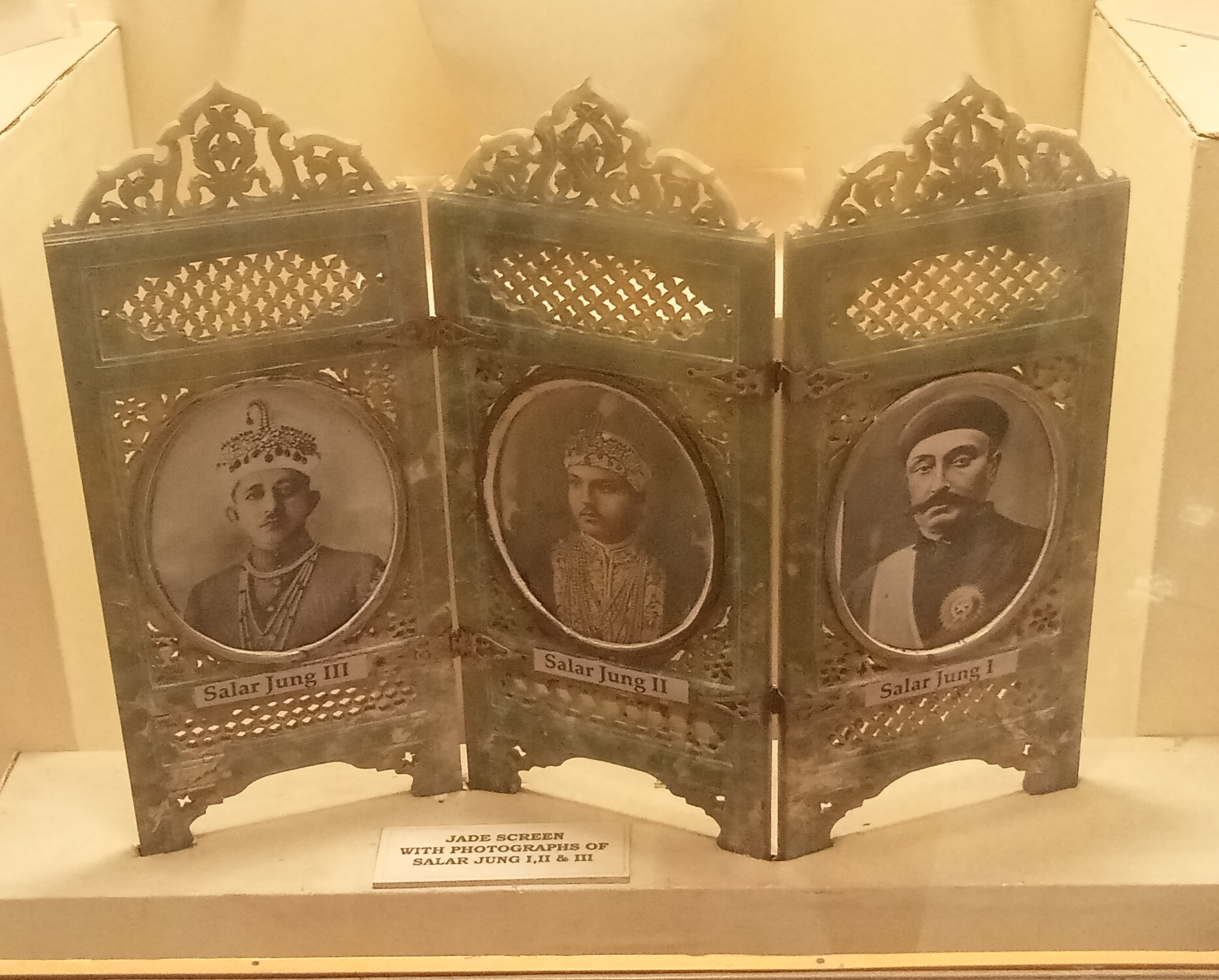
File:Jade_Screen_-_portraits_of_Salar_Jung_I,_II_and_III.jpg

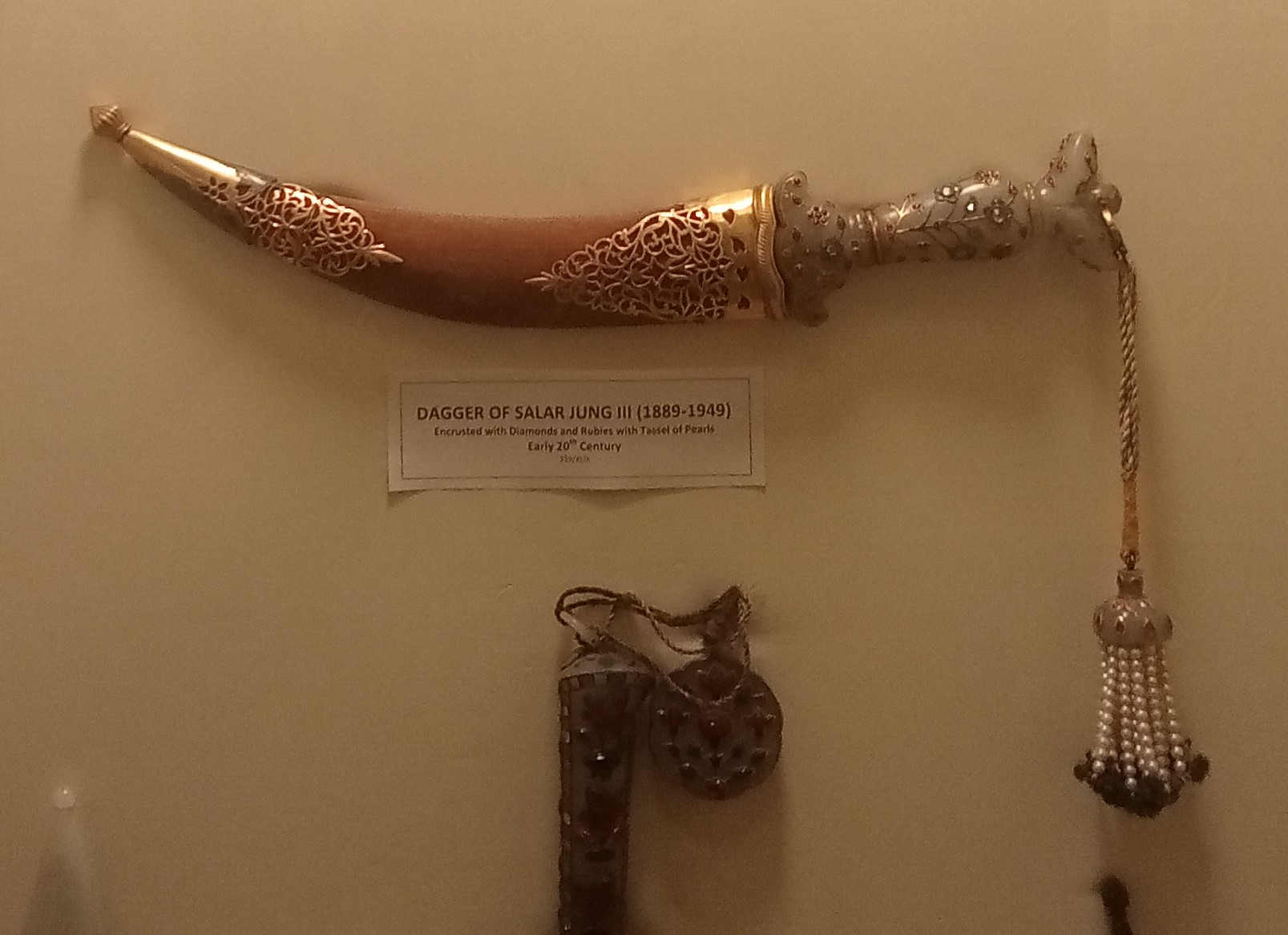
File:Dagger_of_Salar_Jung_with_jade_hilt_-_Early_20th_Century.jpg

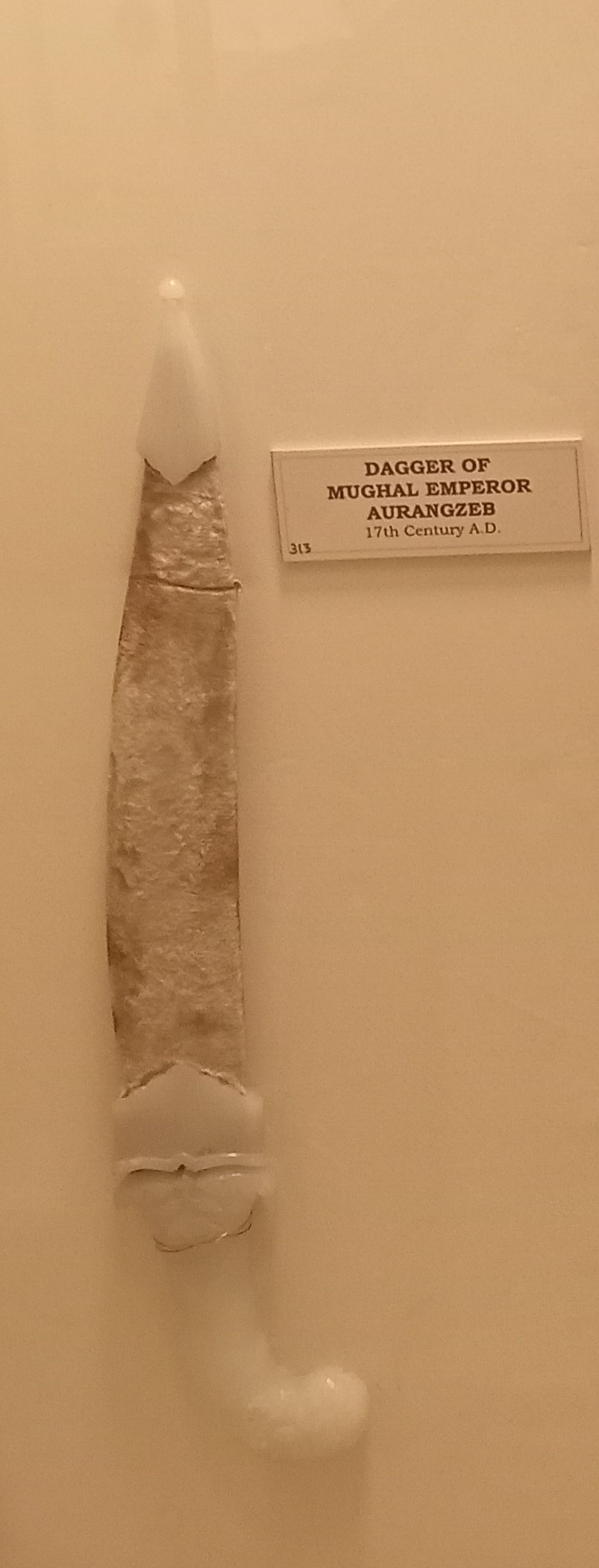
File:Dagger_2_of_Aurangzeb_from_17th_Century.jpg
