= Kishen Pershad =

Prime Minister of Hyderabad (1864–1940)

Maharaja Yamin-us-Sultanat Sir Kishen Pershad GCIE
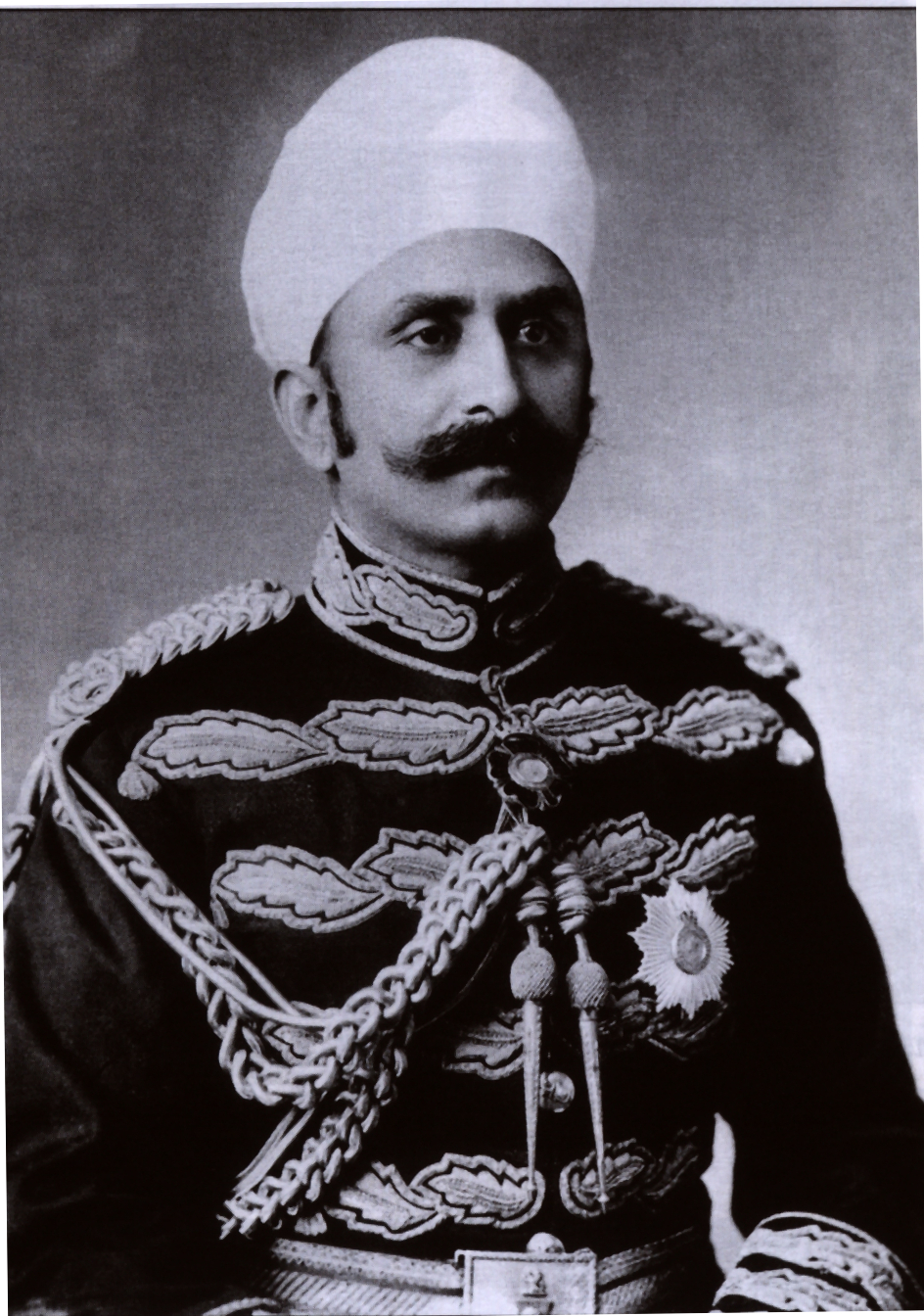

30th Prime Minister of Hyderabad
- In office 25 November 1926 – 18 March 1937
- Monarch: Osman Ali Khan
- Preceded by: Wali-ud-Daula Bahadur
- Succeeded by: Akbar Hydari
- In office 1901 – 11 July 1912
- Monarchs: Mahbub Ali Khan; Osman Ali Khan
- Preceded by: Viqar-ul-Umra
- Succeeded by: Yousuf Ali Khan

Personal details
- Born: Kishen Pershad; 1864 Hyderabad, Hyderabad State (present-day Telangana, India)
- Died: 13 May 1940 (aged 75–76) Hyderabad, Hyderabad State (present-day Telangana, India)
- Spouse: 7

Maharaja Sir Kishen Pershad Bahadur Yamin us-Sultanat GCIE (1864 – 13 May 1940) was an Indian noble who served as Prime Minister of Hyderabad twice.

He was a childhood friend of the Nizam and a staunch Nizam loyalist throughout his life. In 1892, Pershad became the Peshkar (deputy minister) of the state. Nine years later, Nizam Mahbub Ali Khan appointed him dewan (prime minister). During his first tenure as dewan, he was credited with increasing the state's revenue and helping victims of the Great Musi Flood of 1908. In 1926, he was reappointed as dewan. During this period, he passed the Mulki regulations, which favoured local citizens over British for administrative positions.

A proponent of the Ganga-Jamuni tehzeeb (culture of the central plains of Northern India), Pershad also wrote Urdu and Persian poems, which were influenced by Sufism. He was a patron of poetry, paintings and music. He had seven wives including both Hindus and Muslims.

Pershad had built the Chitragupta Bhagwan Temple in Hyderabad. He was also an active freemason.

== Early life ==
Pershad was born in 1864, but his exact date of birth is unrecorded. He claims to have origins from a Khatri Mehra. He claimed to have been "born two years before his highness [Mahboob Ali Khan]". Pershad's ancestor, Rai Mull Chand, migrated from Delhi to Hyderabad with Asaf Jah I. His grandfather Narinder Pershad served as dewan and peshkar (deputy minister) during the reign of Mahbub Ali Khan.

In his youth, Pershad was disinherited by his grandfather Narinder Pershad in favour of his younger brother. Subsequently, he was patronised by Salar Jung I and was educated along with his sons in a western school. Pershad studied accountancy, medicine, religion, astrology and sufism. Besides these, he learned martial arts, Mughal etiquette and court grooming at the school. Pershad studied the Sanskrit language because of his Hindu faith and accountancy because he had the hereditary charge of the royal treasury.

== Political career ==
In 1892, Pershad was appointed peshkar of Hyderabad, and dewan in 1902. During this ten-year period he played an insignificant role in the administration of the state. He became the military minister in the nizam's cabinet. He also fulfilled his responsibilities as a peshkar, which included him constantly attending to the Nizam to help him complete the formalities of state.

In 1901, the Nizam appointed Pershad as dewan of Hyderabad and dismissed Viqar-ul-Umra. He was also conferred with the title "Yamin us Saltanat" (English: right hand of the realm) and his status was raised from that of a raja to a maharaja. In an attempt to improve the economic conditions of the state, he decreased the mansabdars' (landowners) income. He also increased revenues from agriculture, railways, and customs. In 1908, a flood occurred in the state when the Musi River overflowed killing people and destroying property. In response, Pershad arranged for aid and made a personal donation to the victims. He paid salaries in advance and waived debts.

During Pershad's first tenure as the dewan of Hyderabad, the state's cash reserves quadrupled. Although British historians credit the finance minister Casson Walker, a Briton, for this achievement, Hyderabadi tradition gives credit to Pershad. He also maintained a friendly relationship with the British resident. After Nizam Mahbub Ali Khan's death in 1911, Osman Ali Khan ascended the throne. Under his reign, Pershad found it difficult to continue as the dewan and resigned in 1912.

In November 1926, he was reappointed to that position and continued until March 1937. During his second tenure, friction occurred between Pershad and Walker over political appointments. While Walker was in favour of appointing Britons to administrative positions, Pershad was in favour of appointing Mulkies (local citizens). Panic spread amongst the locals because of Walker's preference. They thought that no post, of even moderate or lesser importance, would be available to them. The clash between Pershad and Walker over this matter was continuous and all government departments were affected by it. Pershad passed the Mulki regulations according to which an "outsider" could not be appointed to any position if a suitably-qualified Mulki was available for the job; their educational qualifications were to be given more weight than their family background and retirement was fixed at fifty-five years of age.

== Personal life ==
=== Marriages ===
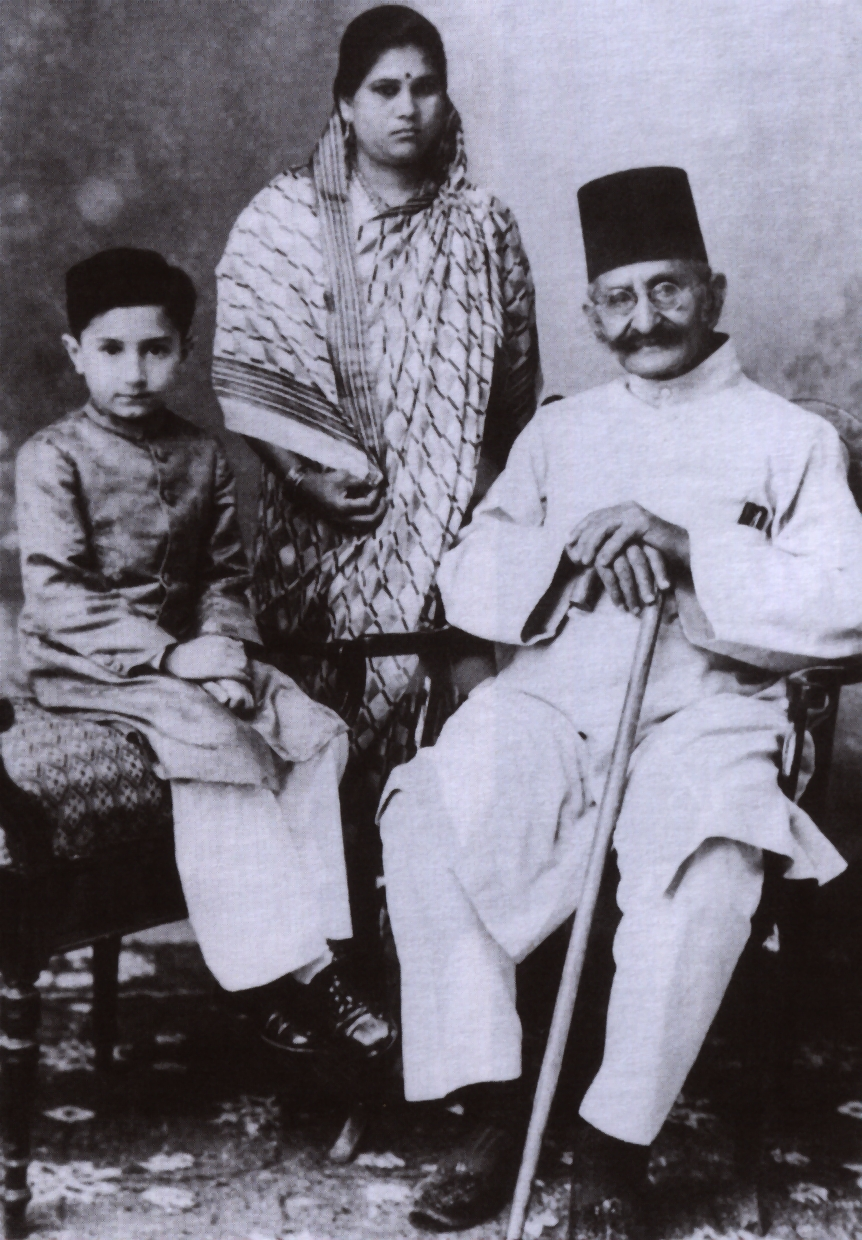
(From left to right): Pershad's grandson Raja Ratan Gopal Saincher, his daughter Rani Sultan Kunwar Bibi and Kishen Pershad

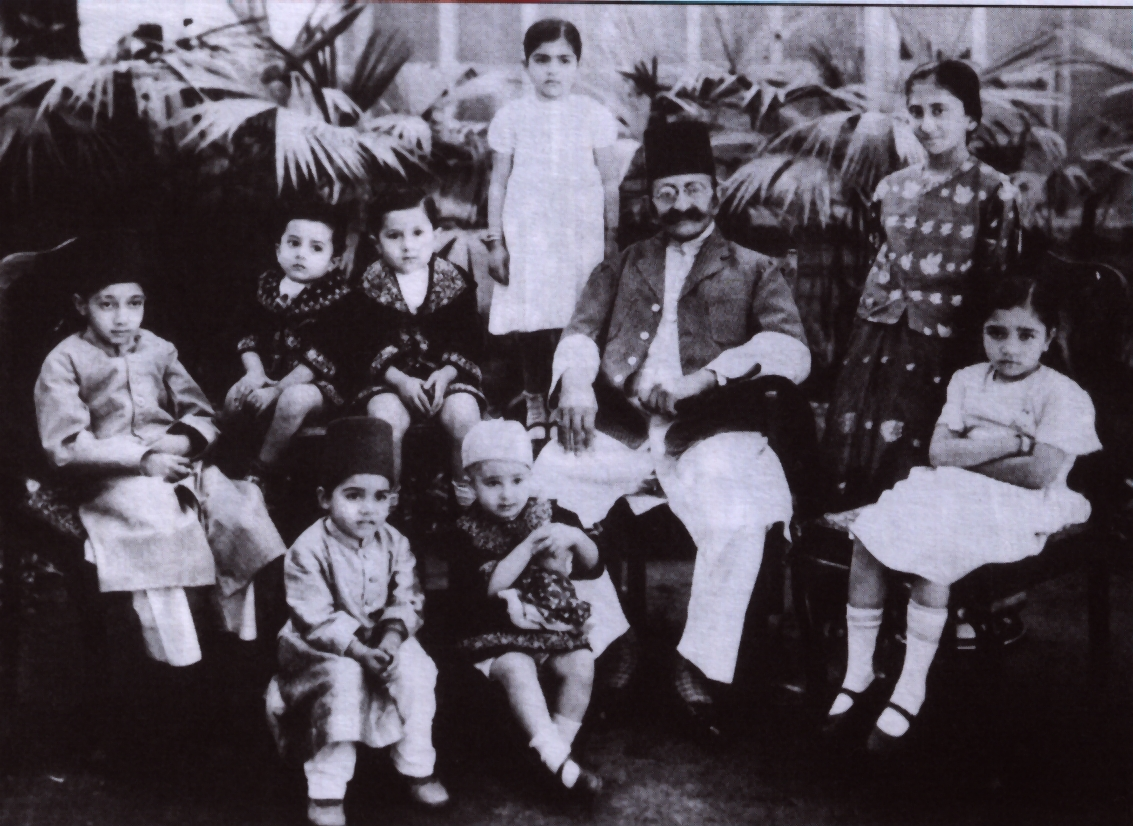
Pershad with his children, c.1935

Pershad had seven wives. Three were Hindus and four were Muslims (which also included Shia Muslims). His Muslim wives bore him six sons; his Hindu wives bore him nine sons. The wives followed their own religion, and the children were brought up in the religion of their mother. The children from Muslim wives had Islamic names; the children from Hindu wives had Hindu names.

One of Pershad's favorite wives was Ghousia Begum. She belonged to an orthodox Muslim family. Although she lived under a strict purdah, they managed to court each other using disguises. According to Islamic law, marriage between a Muslim and a Hindu is not allowed. To marry her, he was ready to convert to Islam. However, Nizam Mahboob Ali Khan was not in favour of him converting as he did not want a Muslim peshkar.

=== Interests and beliefs ===
Pershad wrote Persian and Urdu poems under the pen name "Shad" (English: happy). His poetry was influenced by Sufism. He was also a proponent of Ganga-Jamuni tehzeeb (communal harmony between Hindus and Muslims). He wrote

I am neither Hindu nor a Muslim
My faith reposes in every religion
Shad alone knows of his religious beliefs
As none but the free can fathom the essence of freedom.

Pershad was a patron of poetry, paintings and music. No matter the quality of their work, he encouraged painters, writers and musicians. In the early morning, artists from different parts of India as well as from Persia and Arab countries visited him. He also published an Urdu poetry magazine titled Mahbub Al Kalam. In it the first ghazal was written by Nizam Mahbub Ali Khan, the rest were written by Pershad. The ghazals were written in the form a dialogue between two lovers.

Pershad's hobbies included painting, playing sitar, photography and sculpting. He was a childhood friend of the Nizam and throughout his life, he was a staunch Nizam loyalist.

The Times of India wrote the following about him:

His charismatic personality and legendary largesse endeared him with the masses. His eminence as the supreme personification of all that was good in erstwhile Hyderabad has ensured that 'Maharaja' implies none other than Kishen Pershad.

=== Image and character ===
Despite the fact that Hyderabadi society was feudal in nature and Pershad belonged to an upper caste, during his reign as a minister, his associates consisted of people of every caste and class. According to his family members, he would sit with a beggar on his sofa in his drawing room and would serve him tea. When he was criticised for his acts, he replied, "Do not despise anyone. You never know, it may be God himself who visits you in the guise of a beggar".

Due to his contacts, Pershad was able to understand the sentiments of all sections of society. Even after becoming the prime minister of Hyderabad, he continued his participation in public functions like the inauguration of schools and clinics, and continued to appear as a chief guest in the circus. During the marriage season, he also attended marriages of the common public including the poor when he was invited.

=== Knighthood ===
Pershad was conferred with the KCIE in January 1903 and the GCIE in 1910.

== Death ==
Pershad died at Hyderabad on 13 May 1940. Upon his death, Nizam Osman Ali Khan said "society has witnessed the departure of the last vestige of the Mughal Empire".

== Notes ==
- Ronken Lynton, Harriet (1992), Days of the Beloved, Orient Blackswan, ISBN 9780863112690
- Leonard, Karen Isaksen (1994), Social History of an Indian Caste: The Kayasths of Hyderabad, Hyderabad: Orient Longman, ISBN 9788125000327

Government offices
Preceded by Sir Vicar-ul-Umra	Prime Minister of Hyderabad; 1901–1912	Succeeded by Mir Yousuf Ali Khan, Salar Jung III
Preceded by Wali-ud-Daula Bahadur	Prime Minister of Hyderabad; 1926–1937	Succeeded by Sir Akbar Hydari
