= Mir Mu'min Astarabadi =

16th-century Iran-born Indian statesman

Mir Muhammad Muʼmin Astarabadi

Peshwa of the Golconda Sultanate
- Tenure: 1585–1625
- Born: Astarabad, Safavid Empire
- Died: 1625; Golconda Sultanate
- Buried: Daira Mir Momin

Mir Muhammad Muʼmin Astarabadi was a scholar and statesman who served as the Peshwa (Prime Minister) of the Golconda Sultanate.

== Biography ==
Mir Mu'min was born in a Sayyid family in Astarabad. He was appointed the tutor of Haydar Mirza Safavi by Shah Tahmasp I. Following the death of his protege Haydar in 1576, during the tumultuous period that ensued Mir emigrated from Iran, seeking safer environs.

After arriving in Golconda, he spent the first few years away from matters of the court, concerning himself with scholarly and religious activities. He was appointed the Peshwa in 993 Hijri (1585 CE) or some time before. He would serve in this office for over forty years, until his death in about 1625. He played a major role in the design of the new city of Hyderabad.

The exact date of his death is not known, and various dates are mentioned by sources. However, it is known that he had died shortly before the death of Sultan Muhammad Qutb Shah, whose date of death is known as 9 February 1626. He was buried in Daira Mir Momin, in the mausoleum that he had constructed for himself within his lifetime, and in which his son was already interred. His Urs is celebrated every year in the month of Sha'ban.

== Literary works ==
Mir Mu'min wrote poetry in Persian. Apart from poetry, his major work was the Risala-i-Miqdariyah, which was a scientific treatise dealing with the measurement of length, weight, and distance. The Kitab-i-Raj’at, on the traditions of the prophet was also written by him.

== Bibliography ==
- Zore, Syed Mohiuddin Qadri (1941). میر محمّد مومن: حیات اور کارنامے [Mir Muhammad Muʼmin: Life and Achievements]. Hyderabad.
