= Ahmed Hussain (minister) =

Indian politician (1863–1950)

Nawab Sir Ahmed Hussain, Amin Jung Bahadur CSI
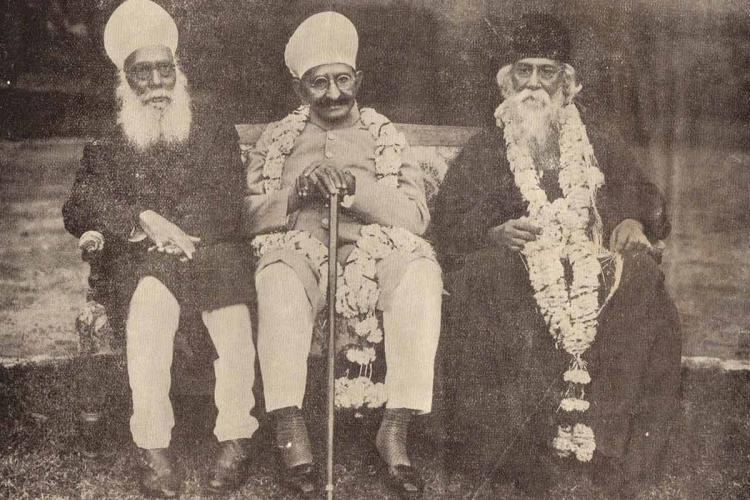
- Amin Jung with Kishen Pershad and Rabindranath Tagore in 1933
- Born: 11August, 1863; Madras, Tamil Nadu, India
- Died: 28 August, 1950; Hyderabad, India
- Education: Osmania University
- Writing career
- Notable works: Philosophy of Faqirs & Notes on Islam

Nawab Sir Ahmed Hussain, Amin Jung Bahadur, KCIE, CSI, LLD (Osmania), MA, BL (Madras) was born in Madras on 11 August 1863 in the family of a leading businessman.

== Life ==
In 1893, he visited Hyderabad (Nizam's Dominion now in Telangana, India) to appear in the Nizam's High court in a civil suit. Within three days of his arrival he was appointed Assistant Peshi Secretary to His Highness the Nizam, Mahbub Ali Khan, Asaf Jah VI.

He attended the Calcutta Durbar of 1902 as Peshi Secretary to H.H. Nizam Mahbub Ali Khan, Asaf Jah VI and the Delhi Durbar in 1911 as Peshi Secretary to H.E.H. Nizam, Mir Osman Ali Khan, Asaf Jah VII and Chief Secretary of the Nizam's Government. In 1917 he was made the Sadar-ul-Moham(Minister) of Peshi. He also served as Minister of Finance and later as Minister of Law and Order in the Nizam's Government. He also served on the Nizam's Judicial Committee which was the highest Court of Appeal. He attended the First Indian Round Table Conference in London UK in 1930 as member of H.E.H the Nizam's delegation. He retired from Nizam's service in 1935.

He collected a large library of English, Urdu, Persian and Arabic books. After his death, the library was donated by his four surviving sons to the Urdu Hall Association in Hyderabad. He also authored two books, one was Philosophy of Faqirs and the other, Notes on Islam.

He died in Hyderabad on 28 August 1950.

== Titles ==
- 1911 - Companion to the order of the Star of India (CSI)

SUPPLEMENT TO THE LONDON GAZETTE, 12 DECEMBER, 1911 India Office, December 12, 1911 The KING-EMPEROR has been graciously pleased to make the following promotions in and appointments to the Most Exalted Order of the Star of India, including additional appointments of Knights Grand Commanders, additional appointments of Knights Commanders, and additional appointments of Companions of the Order under the above Special Statutes of the Most Exalted Order of the Star of India which His Imperial Majesty has been pleased to approve and ordain: —

To be Companions of the said Most Exalted Order:— Maulvi Ahmad Hussain, Private Secretary to His Highness the Nizam of Hyderabad, and Chief Secretary to the Nizam's Government.

== Genealogy ==
Amin Jung married Darwesh Aysha, who was his beloved 1st wife. He had five children from her. Mehmood Hussain, Mehboob Hussain, Khader Hussain, Amina Begum, Zeenat Begum

Mehboob Hussain married Ruqia Begum, from whom he had one son Asif Hussain. Asif Hussain married Mehboobunissa. And they had four children, who are now the surviving heirs(along with their children) of Sir Amin Jung Bahadur from his First Wife - Aysha Basith married to Jawad Basith Atiya Afsar married to S.M Afsar Mohammed Hussain (Habeeb) married to Nazia Hussain Arifa Ali Khan married to Azizuddin Ali Khan

Aysha Basith has two children - Abrar Basith, Zohara Basith

Atiya Afsar has two children - Arshiya Afsar, Aliya Afsar

Mohammed Hussain (Habeeb) has two children - Hiba Hussain, Hira Hussain

Arifa Ali Khan has four children - Ahmed Ali Khan, Aafiya Ali Khan, Raafiya Ali Khan, Mustafa Ali Khan

His other granddaughters and grandson are Tahera Khan, Munira Sayeed, Barika Jaddi, Raisa Khan, Safia Rashid and Hassina Hmidan and Ahmed Hussain- son and daughters of Mr. K Hyder Hussain and Malika Hyder Hussain and Khateeb Azher Hussain, Zahir Hussain and Anees Hussain, son and daughters of Mr. Ather Hussan and Mrs. Maryam Ather-Hussain.

His four other grandchildren (Children of his daughter Zeenat-unnisa and Abdullah Pasha) are Mr. Anwarullah Pasha (Deceased), Mrs Saleem-unnisa Zaman (Pakistan), Mrs Naeema Rasheed (Canada) and Mrs Raheem-unnisa Ahmed (Pakistan/United States).

One of his sons, Dr. K. Khasim Hussain was an expert in infectious diseases. Other sons included (Khateeb) Hyder Hussain, K. Zakir Hussain and K. Ather Hussain.

His third daughter was Aqtar-unnisa, who married Mr. Mir Hussain and their children are Rahat Habeebullah, Karamat Hussain (married to Laurie Hussain), Asmat Uddin, (London), Basharat Hussain (Canada), Rafat Asad (deceased) (married to Mir Asad Ali), Salamat Ashrafuddin and Iffat Hussain (deceased).

== See also ==
- Nizam
- Fath Jang Mahbub Ali Khan Asif Jah VI
- Mir Osman Ali Khan
- Hyderabad State
- Hyderabad, India
