= Dewan Devdi =

Coordinates: 17.36885°N 78.47651°E

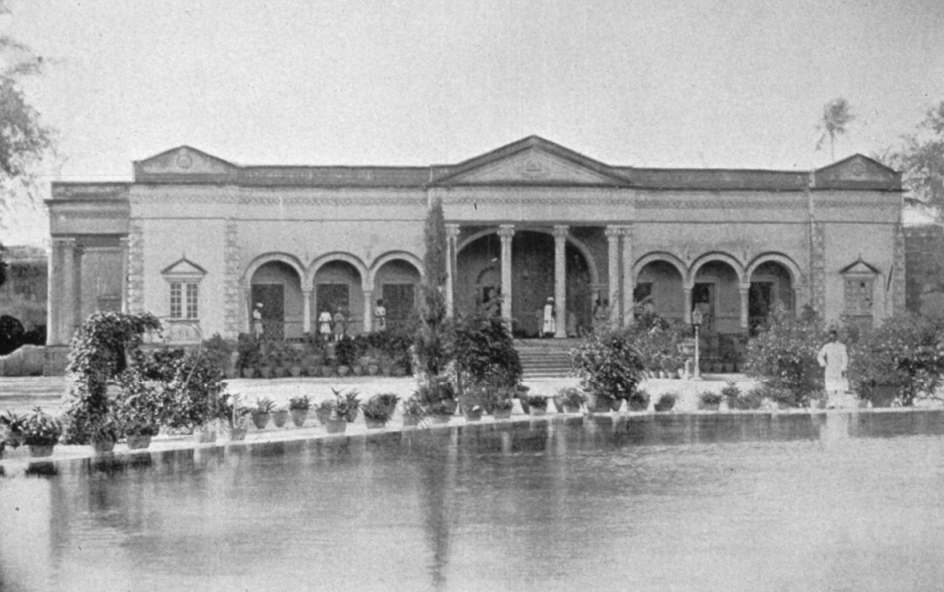
- Interactive map of the Dewan Devdi area

General information
- Location: Hyderabad

Dewan Devdi was the palace of the nobles, the Salar Jungs, situated close to Charminar and Chowmahalla Palace in Hyderabad, India. The word Diwan means Prime Minister, and Devdi refers to mansions of Hyderabadi noblemen.

There were five people from the family, who served as Prime Ministers of the Hyderabad state, the proximity of Dewan Devdi to the Nizams was important.

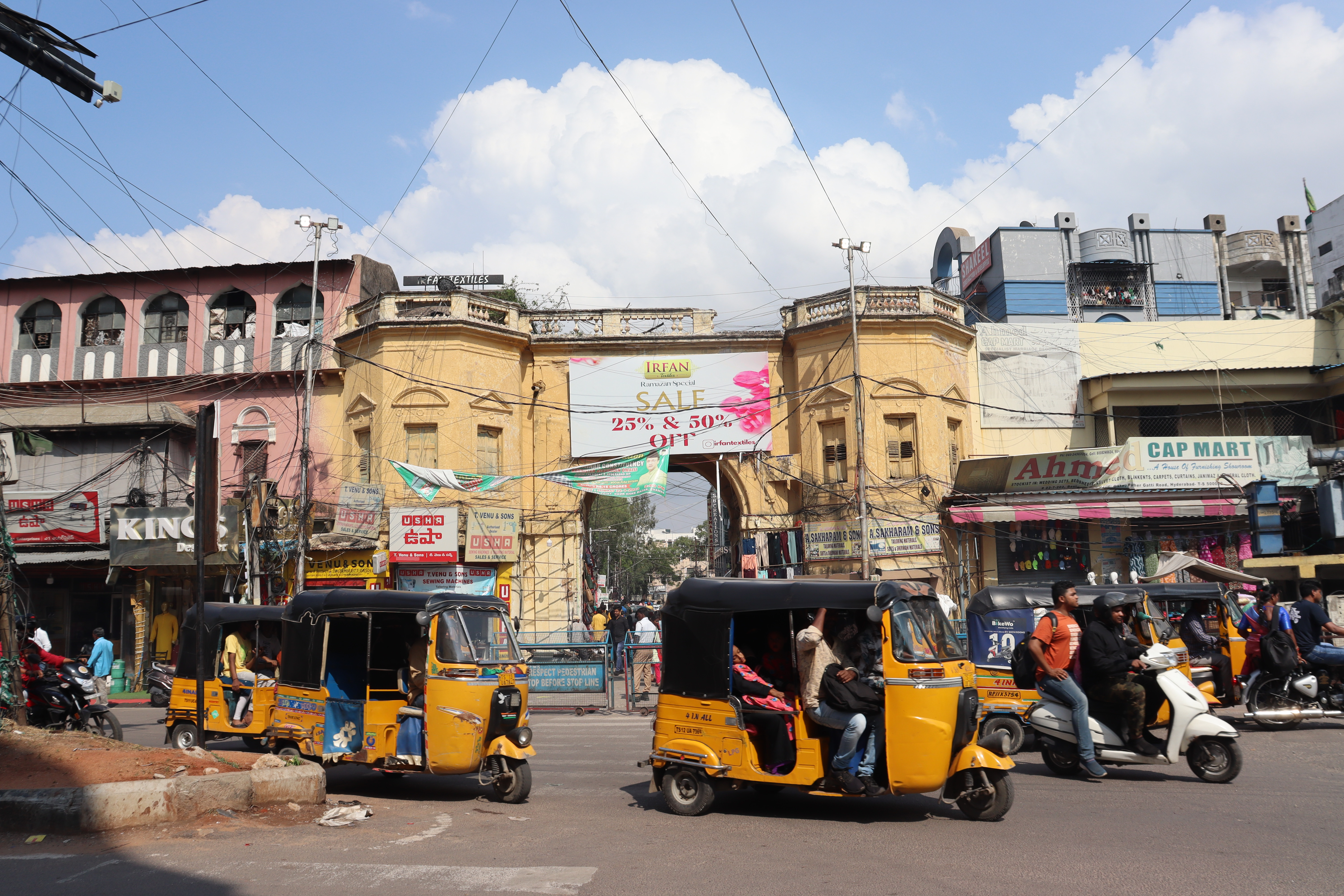
Dewan Deori gate once served as the entrance to the Salar Jung Museum until the 1960s,

Dewan Devdi also housed the Salar Jung Museum. The museum was inaugurated on 16 December 1951 by Jawaharlal Nehru and its priceless collection was housed in this 100-year-old palace, a private collection of the Salar Jungs, before it moved to its present location. The various portions of the building were gradually demolished by the family members of Salar Jung after his demise in 1949. This palace is now converted into a market and home to various travel and other commercial offices. Only the gateway of the palace has survived.

== Description ==
Dewan Devdi has some 78 rooms in it. It had different buildings like Aina Khana, Lakkad Kotha, Chini Khana, Nizam Bagh and Noor Mahal, which no more exist. The gateway to the palace still exists.

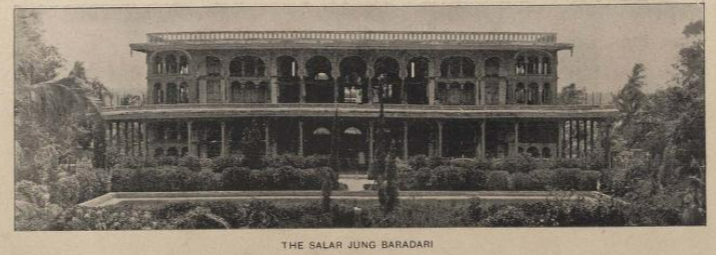
Salar Jung Baradari
