= Avandha Fort =

Fortress in Aundhewadi, India

- औंढ़ा/ अवंढा किल्ला
- Part of Kalsubai Hill Range
- Nashik district, Maharashtra
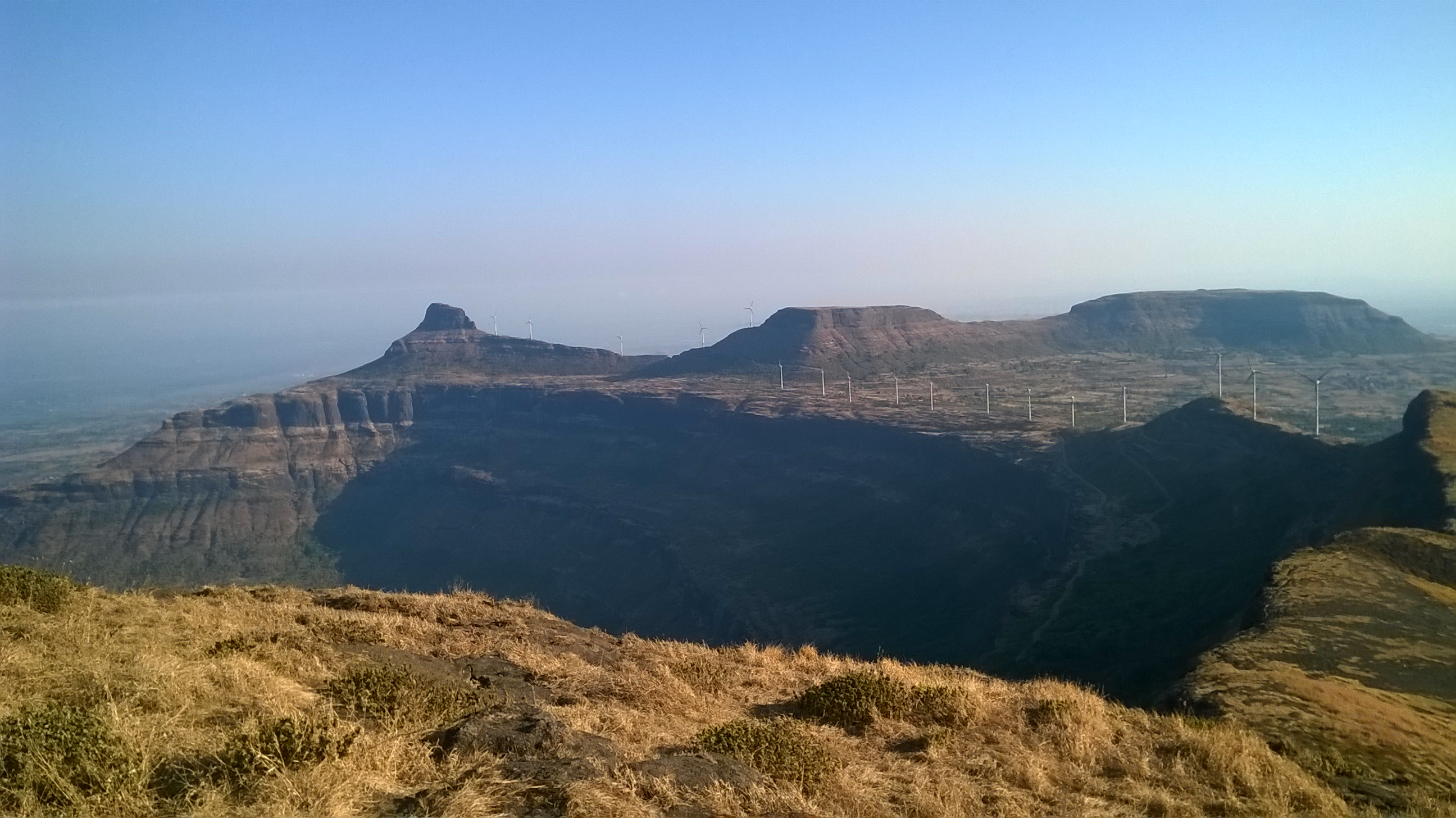
- Avandha fort from Patta fort

Site information
- Type: Hill fort
- Owner: Mughal Empire (1688-1761); Maratha Empire (1761-1818); British Empire (1818-1947); Government of India (1947-)
- Open to the public: Yes
- Condition: Ruins

Location
- Shown within Maharashtra
- Coordinates: 19°44′46.8″N 73°50′13.8″E
- Height: 4400 Ft.

Site history
- Materials: Stone

Avandha Fort, or Avandha Killa (Marathi: औंढ़ा/ अवंढा किल्ला), is a fort situated in Aundhewadi village between Nasik and Ahmadnagar in Maharashtra. This fort is close to Patta Fort. The residents of Patta Killa are known as Pattekar, meaning "residents of Fort Patta".

== History ==
The history of this fort is similar to the adjoining Patta fort. On 11 January 1688, this fort was captured by Moghul army headed by Matabarkhan. He appointed Shyamsingh as the chief of the fort. Later this fort was captured by Peshwas in 1761. Finally in 1818 this fort was won by the British.

== Places to see ==
This fort is very difficult to climb due to the broken stone cut steps at many places. Except for rock cut cisterns and steps which lead to the highest point, there are very few structures left on the fort.

== Gallery ==
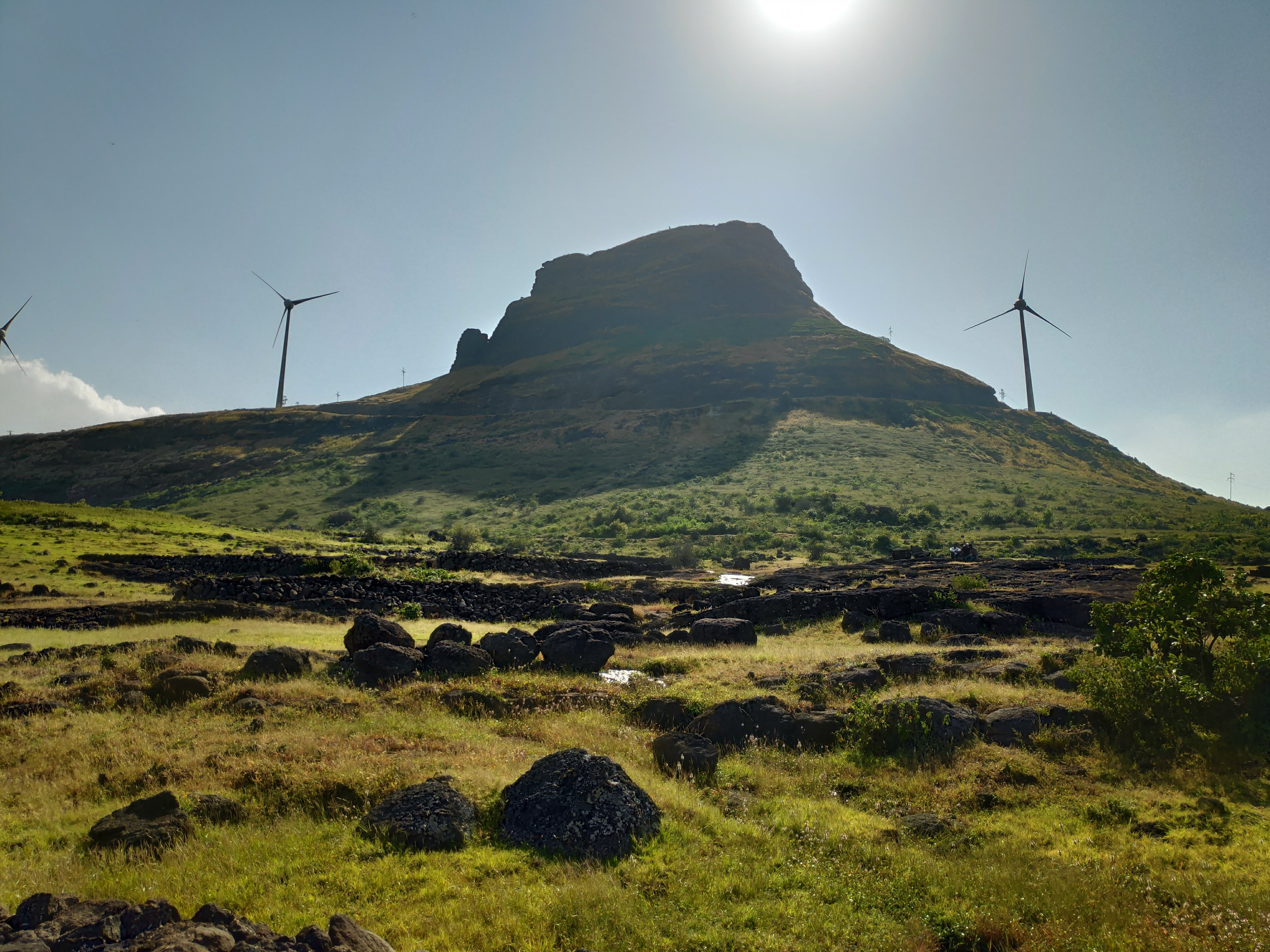
Aundha Fort
