= Mir Laiq Ali Khan, Salar Jung II =

Politician of Hyderabad State

Mir Laiq Ali Khan Salar Jung II, KCIE
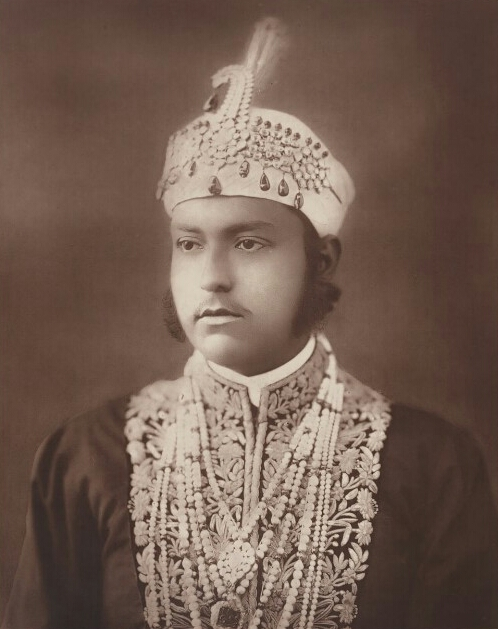
- Died: July 7, 1889
- Children: Salar Jung III
- Father: Salar Jung I

Prime Minister of Hyderabad
- In office 1884–1887
- Monarch: Asaf Jah VI
- Preceded by: Salar Jung I
- Succeeded by: Asman Jah

Sir Mir Laiq Ali Khan, Salar Jung II KCIE (died 7 July 1889) was a former Prime Minister of Hyderabad State (1884–1887). He belonged to the noble Salar Jung family. He is also known for authoring the Persian-language travelogue Vaqayeʿ-e Mosaferat.

== Early life ==
Mir Laiq Ali Khan was the son of Mir Turab Ali Khan, Salar Jung I. He was educated at the Madrasa-i-Aliya, and subsequently studied in England in 1882, for less than a year. In 1883, he received the title of 'Salar Jung' from the Nizam of Hyderabad.

== Prime Minister of Hyderabad State ==
In 1884, aged twenty-two, Salar Jung II was appointed diwan (Prime Minister) of Hyderabad. During his tenure, he ordered the official language of Hyderabad State to be shifted from Persian to Urdu. Though initially close to the incumbent Nizam, Mahboob Ali Khan, he later fell out of favour and resigned from the post of Prime Minister in April 1887.

== Later life ==
In May 1887, Salar Jung II embarked on a tour of Europe, managed by entrepreneur Moreton Frewen. Towards the end of his journey, while venturing in England, he was awarded the title Knight Commander of the Indian Empire by Queen Victoria. He documented his experiences abroad in a Persian-language travelogue titled 'Vaqayeʿ-e Mosaferat'. The work is one of the last Indo-Persian travelogues.

== Death ==
Salar Jung II died of an alcohol-related illness on 7 July 1889, two months after he returned to Hyderabad from his journey. He was aged 27. His son, Mir Yousuf Ali Khan, Salar Jung III, born 4 June 1889, was only one month old at this time.

== See also ==
- Salar Jung family

Government offices
| Preceded by Mir Turab Ali Khan, Salar Jung I | Prime Minister of Hyderabad; 1884–1887 | Succeeded by Nawab Asman Jah Bahadur |
