= List of prime ministers of Hyderabad State =

Hyderabad State

Prime Minister of the Hyderabad State
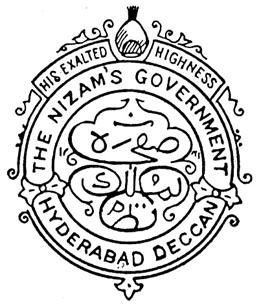
- Coat of Arms (Hyderabad State)

- Flag of Hyderabad State
- Status: Abolished
- Residence: Hyderabad
- Seat: Hyderabad
- Formation: 1724
- First holder: Muhammad Iwaz Khan
- Final holder: Mir Laiq Ali
- Abolished: 1948

This article lists the prime ministers of the Hyderabad State.

In 1919, Asaf Jah VII ordered the formation of the Executive Council of Hyderabad, presided by Sir Sayyid Ali Imam, and with eight other members, each in charge of one or more departments. The President of the Executive Council would also be the Prime Minister of Hyderabad. The position was abolished in 1948 when the Indian Army invaded the Hyderabad State and merged it with the Union of India.

== List of officeholders ==
No	Portrait	Name	Took office	Left office	Term
1		Iwaz Khan	1724	1730	1
2		Anwarullah Khan	1730	1742	1
3		Khuda Banda Khan	1742	1748	1
4		Shah Nawaz Khan	1748	1750	1
5		Raja Raghu Nath Das	1750	1752	1
6		Syed Lashkar Khan Rukn ud-Daula	1752	1755	1
7		Shah Nawaz Khan	1755	1758	2
8		Basalat Jung	1758	1761	1
9		Vitthal Sundar	1761	1765	1
10		Musa Khan Nawab Rukn ud-Daula	1765	1775	1
11		Viqar-ul-daula Shams-ul-Mulk	1775	1778 to 1781	1
12		Arastu Jah	1781	1795	1
13		Raja Shan Rai Rayan	1795	1797	1
14		Arastu Jah	1797	9 May 1804	2
15		Raja Rajindra Bahadur (Raja Raghutam Rao)	May 1804	9 November 1804	1
16		Mir Alam	1804	1808	1
17		Chandu Lal	1808	unknown date	1
18		Munir ul-Mulk	unknown	1832	1
19		Chandu Lal	1832	1843	2
20		Ram Baksh	1843	1846	1
21		Siraj ul-Mulk	1846	1848	1
22		Amjad ul-Mulk	November 1848	December 1848	1
23		Shams ul-Umara	December 1848	May 1849	1
24		Ram Baksh	September 1849	April 1851	2
25		Ganesh Rao	April 1851	June 1851	1
26		Siraj ul-Mulk	1851	May 1853	2
27		Mir Turab Ali Khan, Salar Jung I	May 1853	8 February 1883	1
28		Mir Laiq Ali Khan, Salar Jung II	February 1883	April 1887	1
29		Nawab Sir Bashir-ud-Daula Asman Jah	1887	1893	1
30		Nawab Sir Viqar-ul-Umra	1893	1901	1
31		Maharaja Sir Kishen Pershad (1st tenure)	1901	11 July 1912	1
32		Nawab Mir Yousuf Ali Khan, Salar Jung III	July 1912	November 1914	1
33		Direct rule by Nizam Osman Ali Khan, Asaf Jah VII with Nawab Sir Ahmed Hussain, Amin Jung Bahadur as de facto Prime Minister	November 1914	1919	–
34		Syed Ali Imam	August 1919	5 September 1922	1
35		Nawab Sir Faridoon-ul-Mulk Bahadur	5 September 1922	1 April 1924	1
36		Wali-ud-Daula Bahadur	1 April 1924	25 November 1926	1
37		Maharaja Sir Kishen Pershad (2nd tenure)	25 November 1926	18 March 1937	2
38		Sir Akbar Hydari	18 March 1937	September 1941	1
39		Nawab Sir Muhammad Ahmad Said Khan Chhatari (1st tenure)	September 1941	August 1946	1
40		Sir Mirza Muhammad Ismail	August 1946	May 1947	1
41		Nawab Sir Muhammad Ahmad Said Khan Chhatari (2nd tenure)	May 1947	29 October 1947	2
42		Nawab Mehdi Yar Jung (acting)	1 November 1947	28 November 1947	1
43		Mir Laiq Ali (provisional)	29 November 1947	19 September 1948	1

== See also ==
- List of Diwans of Mysore
- List of Diwans of Travancore
