= Mir Turab Ali Khan, Salar Jung I =

Prime Minister of Hyderabad (1829–1883)

His Excellency Mukhtar-ul-Mulk, Shuja ud-Daula, Nawab Sir Mir Turab Ali Khan Salar Jung I, GCSI
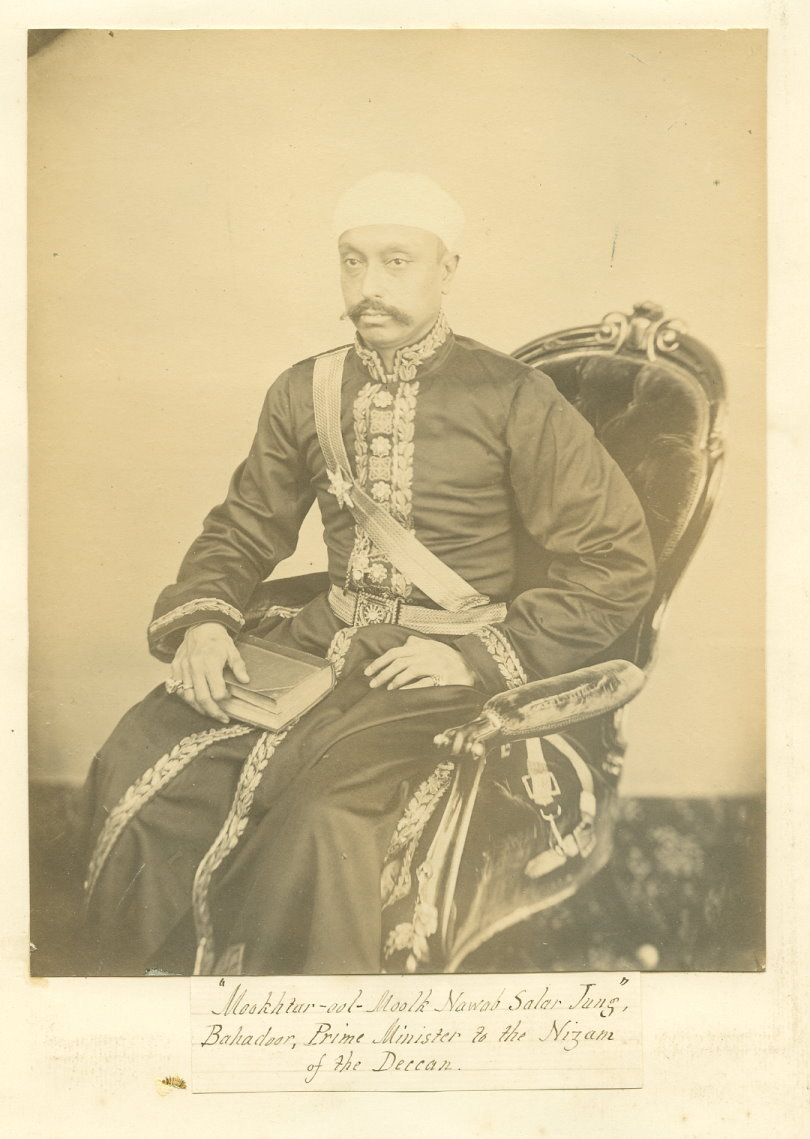
- Jung in an undated photo
- Born: January 21, 1829; Bijapur, Hyderabad State, British India
- Died: February 8, 1883 (aged 54); Hyderabad, Hyderabad State, British India
- Burial place: Daira Mir Momin, Hyderabad
- Family: Salar Jung family

Prime Minister of Hyderabad
- In office 1853–1883
- Monarchs: Asaf Jah IV; Asaf Jah V Asaf Jah VI
- Preceded by: Siraj ul-Mulk
- Succeeded by: Salar Jung II

Sir Mir Turab Ali Khan, Salar Jung I, GCSI (21 January 1829 – 8 February 1883), known simply as Salar Jung I, was an Indian nobleman who served as Prime Minister of Hyderabad State from 1853 until his death in 1883. He also served as regent for the sixth Nizam, Asaf Jah VI between 1869 and 1883.

His tenure is known for administrative reforms, which included a reorganization of the revenue and judicial systems, the division of Hyderabad State into districts, institution of a postal service, establishment of the first modern educational institutions, and construction of the first rail and telegraph networks. A small offshoot of the Indian Rebellion of 1857 took place in Hyderabad State during his tenure, and he was partly responsible for quelling it.

He was one of the five Prime Ministers from the Salar Jung family, one of the most prominent families of the state. His daughter Amat-uz-Zehra married Asaf Jah VI, and he was the maternal grandfather of the last Nizam, Mir Osman Ali Khan.

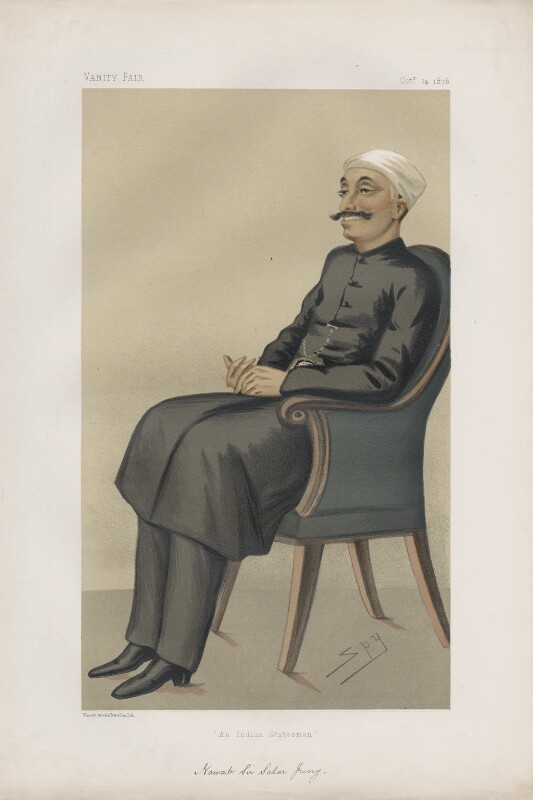
Vanity Fair caricature by Spy (Leslie Ward), c. 1876. The caption reads "An Indian Statesman"

== Early life ==
Khan was born in Bijapur in 1829. He was a descendant of a family which had held various appointments, first under the Adil Shahi dynasty of Bijapur, then under the Mughal Empire, and lastly under the Nizams. His father was Muhammad Ali Khan, the eldest son of Mir Alam, and his mother was the daughter of Saiad Kazim Ali Khan. He was educated privately.

== Career ==
He was appointed the talukdar of Medak in 1847. He held the position for 8 months.

=== Prime Minister of Hyderabad ===
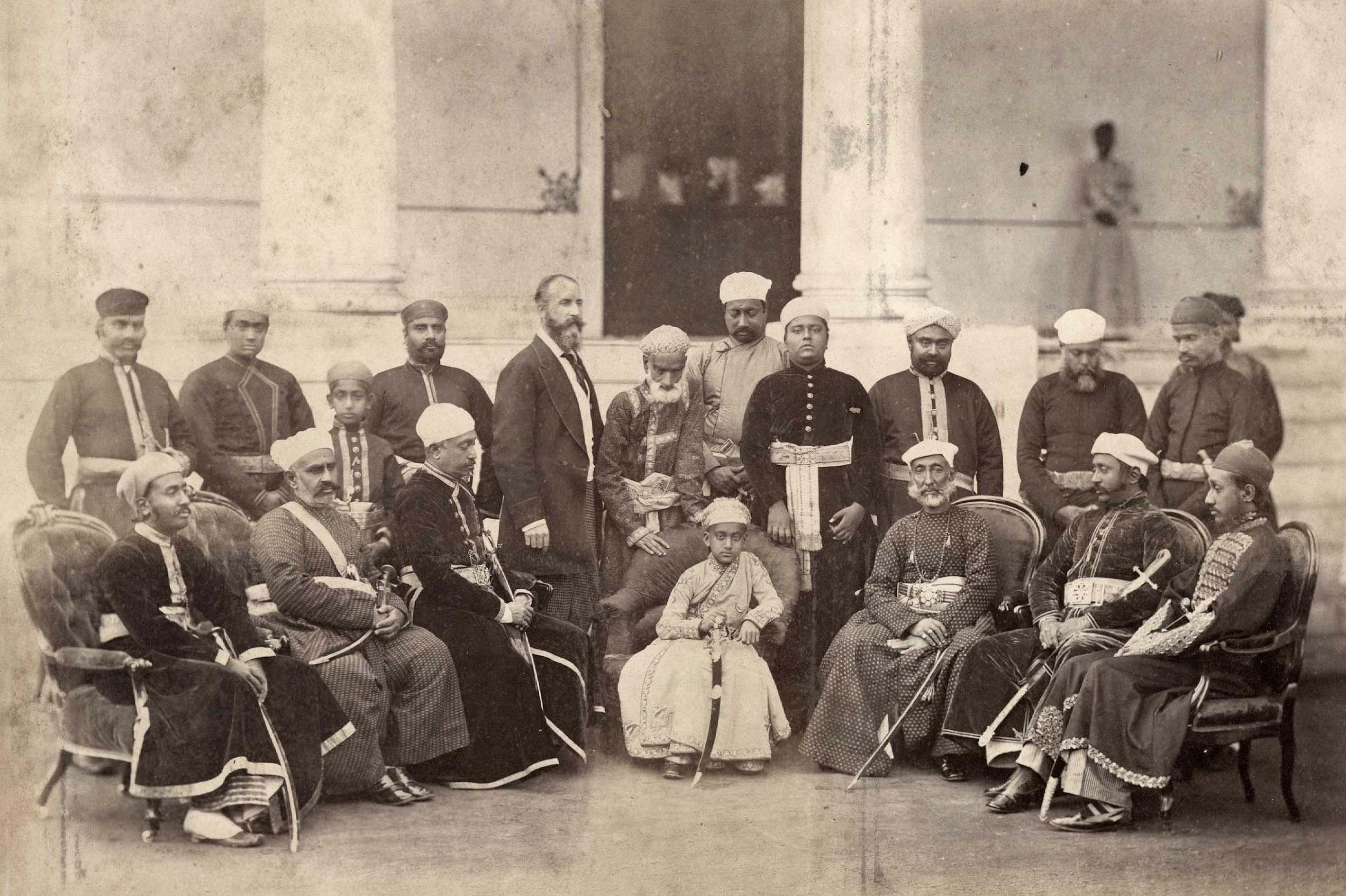
Salar Jung I (seated, third from left) with Asaf Jah VI (seated, center) and shams-ul-Umra II (seated, third from right), c. 1870s.

He succeeded his uncle Siraj-ul-Mulk as the prime minister in 1853 at the age of 23. During this time, the administration of the Hyderabad State was infused with corruption, and there was no systematic form of government.

Before the administration of H. E. the Nawab Salar Jung I there was no regular or systematic form of government, nor were there any separate departments of administration. Everything was in the hands of the Diwan or Minister, without any regular form of administration. It was altogether a new idea, an element foreign to the conservative mind of Hyderabad to have anything like an organised system of government.

— Chiragh Ali

His early reforms included constitution of courts of justice at Hyderabad, organization of the police force, construction and reparation of irrigation works, and establishment of schools. In 1854, the first modern educational institution in Hyderabad was established by the name, Dar-ul-Ulum.

On the outbreak of the Indian rebellion of 1857, he supported the British, and although unable to hinder an attack on the British Residency, he warned the British minister that it was in contemplation. The attack was repulsed; the Hyderabad contingent remained loyal, and their loyalty served to ensure the tranquility of the region. Salar Jung took advantage of the preoccupation of the British government with the rebellion to push his reforms more boldly, and when the Calcutta authorities were again at liberty to consider the condition of affairs his work had been carried far towards completion.

In 1867, the State was divided into five Divisions (subahs) — namely Berar, Bidar, Bijapur, Aurangabad, and Hyderabad, and seventeen Districts, and subedars, or governors, were appointed for the five Divisions and talukdars and tehsildars for the districts.

The other important reform introduced by Salar Jung was the stabilization of currency. A central mint was established at Hyderabad and the district mints were abolished. He issued Hali Sikka rupees and this became the standard currency for all monetary transactions. A government treasury was established in the city, and the customs department brought directly under the government.

=== As Regent ===
On 26 February 1869, Asaf Jah V died, and his eldest son Mir Mahbub Ali Khan, a boy of two, was crowned as the sixth Nizam. Salar Jung, at the insistence of the British government, was associated in the regency along with the principal noble of the state, Shams-ul-Umara. In 1881, Shams-ul-Umara died and Salar Jung remained as the sole regent. During the lifetime of the Asaf Jah V, Salar Jung was considerably hampered by the Nizam's supervision, but during his tenure as regent, he enjoyed greater authority. Salar Jung also personally tutored the Nizam on matters of the state.

In 1868, an attempt was made on Salar Jung's life, on the day of Eid ul-Fitr as he was proceeding towards the Nizam's court. Two pistol-shots were fired, of which one injured his attendant, while the other grazed his turban. The assassin was immediately captured, and would have been lynched by the crowd, however, Salar Jung forbade any further violence, and asked that he be handed over to the police. He sentenced to death by beheading, although Salar Jung himself had appealed for the sentence to be commuted to imprisonment. The motive for the crime remains unknown as the assassin never made a confession.

Sir Salar was created G.C.S.I. on 28 May 1870. In 1876, he visited England with the object of obtaining the restoration of Berar. Although he was unsuccessful, his personal merits met with full recognition. A London journal remarked - "Our guest is the man who, when Delhi had fallen and our power was, for the moment, in the balance, saved Southern India for England". He received the honorary degree of D.C.L. from the University of Oxford on 21 June 1876.

== Art collection ==
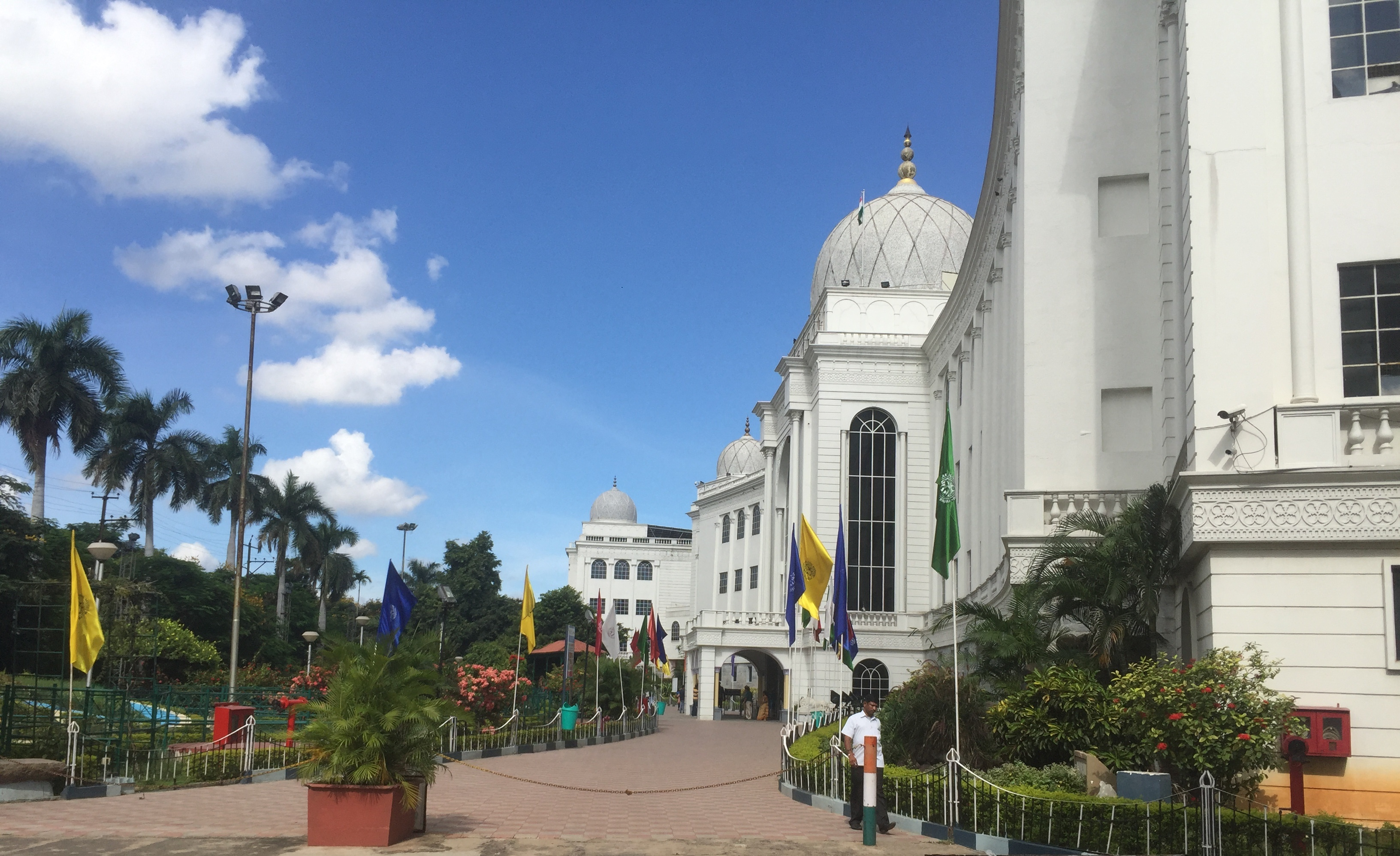
The Salar Jung Museum, Hyderabad (India)

In 1876 on a trip to France the unique "double sculpture " Mephistopheles & Margaretta sculpture was acquired by Khan. He also traveled to Rome where he purchased a marble statue called Veiled Rebecca.

The Salar Jung family had a history of collecting art, and eventually the collection of art from Salar Jung I, II and III all ended up in the Salar Jung Museum.

== Personal life ==
He had two sons and two daughters. His daughter Amat-uz-Zehra married Asaf Jah VI, and he was therefore the maternal grandfather of the last Nizam, Mir Osman Ali Khan.

== Death and legacy ==
He died of cholera at Hyderabad on 8 February 1883, and was buried at the Daira Mir Momin. A three-day mourning period was declared for all of Hyderabad State. His son Salar Jung II succeeded him as Prime Minister. His grandson enjoyed an estate of 1486 sq. miles, yielding an income of nearly £60,000.

== See also ==
- Salar Jung Museum
- Salar Jung family
- Hyderabad State

Government offices
Preceded by Siraj ul-Mulk	Prime Minister of Hyderabad; 1853–1883	Succeeded by Mir Laiq Ali Khan, Salar Jung II
