= Salar Jung family =

Noble Hyderabad family

- Country: Hyderabad State, British Indian Empire
- Connected members: Nizams of Hyderabad
- Connected families: Asaf Jahi dynasty , Paigah family
- Estate: Diwan Devdi

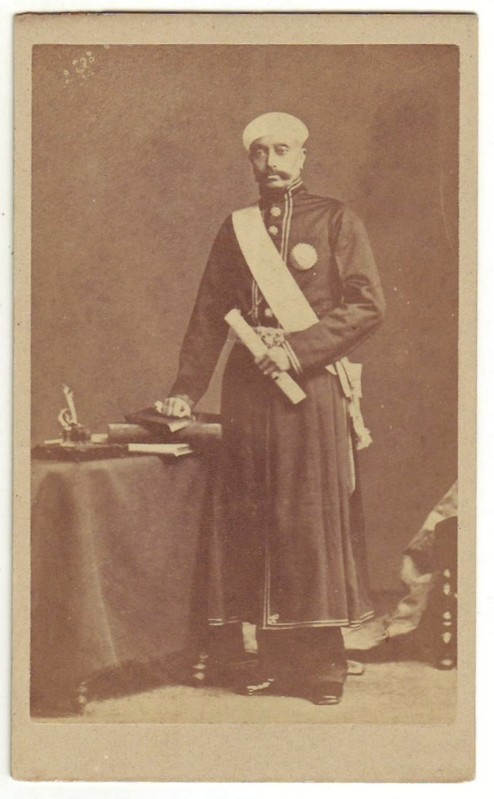
Salarjung

The Salar Jung family was a noble Hyderabad family under the Nizams, who ruled from 1720 to 1948. They are credited with safeguarding rare artifacts and collections, which are now at Salar Jung Museum.

The family were one of the remaining families of nobles other than the three great Paigah nobles, (who were the highest order of nobility under the Nizams) and after them ranked the Umra-e-Uzzam families. The Salar Jung family was one of the Umra-e-Uzzam. Their ancestry dates to the 16th century. By the middle of the 19th century, the family assumed importance as five members served as Grand Viziers to the Nizams.

The family resided at the Dewan Devdi palace.

The five Prime Ministers from the family are buried at Daira Mir Momin, a graveyard in the old city of Hyderabad. Prince Moazzam Jah and classical musician Bade Ghulam Ali Khan are also buried there.

They claimed descent from Owais al-Qarani, who lived in the times of Prophet Muhammad. According to the legend their claimed ancestor Shaikh Owais II who was tenth in descent from Owais, arrived in India during the reign of Ali Adil Shah of Bijapur, and established himself by marrying his son Shaikh Muhammad Ali to Minister Mulla Ahmad Nawayet's daughter.

The family's Jagir comprised six taluks: Kosgi, Ajanta, Koppal, Yelburga, Dundgal, Raigir which had a total of 333 villages with a population of 180,150 (1901), spread over an area of 1.486 square miles that produced a revenue of 820,000.

== Members ==
- Mir Turab Ali Khan, Salar I
  - Mir Laiq Ali Khan Salar Jung II
    - Mir Yousuf Ali Khan, Salar Jung III

== See also ==
- Salar Jung Museum

== Legal disputes ==
The Salar Jung estate has been the subject of prolonged legal battles. In 2021, the Supreme Court of India directed the expeditious resolution of what it described as one of the country’s oldest civil suits, involving the distribution of Salar Jung family properties.

In 2024, reports surfaced of a disputed gift deed, in which land valued at ₹150 crore was transferred to the driver of a Shiv Sena Member of Parliament by a Salar Jung descendant.

Courts have also reviewed appointments to the Salar Jung Museum board, where family members traditionally hold seats.
