= List of Hyderabadi Muslims =

Hyderabadi Muslims are an ethnocultural community of Muslims, part of a larger group of Dakhini Muslims, from the area that used to be the princely state of Hyderabad, India, including cities like Hyderabad, Aurangabad, Nanded and Bidar.

First generation immigrants are not included, but second and third generation immigrants who have adopted Hyderabadi Muslim culture are usually considered Hyderabadi Muslims, and are included in the list. Descendants of those who shifted from Hyderabad or the Deccan to other regions/countries are also included.

== Literature ==
- Syed Waheed Akhtar (1934–1996), Urdu poet, writer, critic, orator, and Muslim scholar and philosopher
- Samina Ali, PEN/Hemingway Award winner for her novel Madras on Rainy Days
- Sulaiman Areeb (b. 1922), Urdu poet
- Siraj Aurangabadi (1715–1763), Sufi mystic poet and a Persian/Urdu author and poet
- Fatima Surayya Bajia (1930–2016), Pakistani Urdu novelist and playwright
- Mirza Farhatullah Baig (1883–1947), Urdu writer
- Abid Hasan (d. 1986), translated Tagore's Jana Gana Mana into Shubh Sukh Chain
- Mujtaba Hussain (b. 1936), Urdu satirist and humorist; Padma Shri recipient
- Amjad Hyderabadi (1878–1961), Urdu poet of Ruba'i
- Khamakha Hyderabadi (1929–2017), Urdu language poet and humorist from Hyderabad, known for his poems and was a regular at Mazahiya Mushairas
- Omar Khalidi (1952–2010), authored Hyderabad: After the Fall; migrated to US
- M. A. Muqtedar Khan (b. 1966), political science professor, Islamic philosopher and Muslim intellectual
- Masood Ali Khan (b. 1947), authored Islamic and cultural encyclopedia
- Mir Taher Ali Khan, distinguished linguistic scholar and professor in European languages
- Bilkees I. Latif (1931–2017), authored four books
- Syed Abdul Latif, Indian writer of English literature; president of Institute of Indo-Middle East Cultural Studies and Academy of Islamic Studies, Hyderabad; author of books on Islamic culture and Urdu literature
- Kenan Malik, writer on race and multiculturalism
- Anwar Maqsood (b. 1940), Pakistani script writer, anchorperson, show host
- Ahmed Abdullah Masdoosi (1905–1968), Pakistani poet
- Fatima Farheen Mirza, American novelist best known for her novel A Place for Us (2018), which was a New York Times best seller
- Makhdoom Mohiuddin (1908–1969), Urdu poet and Marxist politician
- Sayyid Ahmedullah Qadri (1909–1985), Urdu writer, critic, author and politician; President of Lutfuddaulah Oriental Research Institute, Hyderabad
- Sayyid Shamsullah Qadri (1885–1953), Urdu scholar, writer, historian and archaeologist
- Aziz Qaisi (1931–1992), Urdu poet, short story writer, and film writer
- Awaz Sayeed (1934–1995), Urdu writer of short stories and biographer
- Haroon Siddiqui, Indo-Canadian journalist
- Wali Mohammed Wali (1667–1707), considered by many scholars to be the "father of Urdu poetry", being the first established poet to have composed ghazals in the Urdu language
- Mohiuddin Qadri Zore (1905–1962), Urdu poet, literary critic and historian, established Idare Adabiyaat-e-Urdu in Hyderabad
- Sikandar Ali Wajd (1914–1983) - Urdu poet from Aurangabad, Maharashtra India
- Sughra Humayun Mirza (1884 - 1958) - Also known as Begum Sughra, was a social reformer, Urdu writer and traveller from Hyderabad, India. She is believed to be Hyderabad's first female novelist, having written 14 major novels.

== Religious scholars ==
- Maulana Abdullah Quraishi Al-Azhari (1935–2015), Islamic scholar from Hyderabad; served as the khateeb and imam of the Mecca Masjid in Hyderabad and the vice chancellor of Jamia Nizamia University
- Hashim Amir Ali, Islamic scholar and translator of the Quran in English under the title The Message of the Quran – presented in perspective (1974)
- Hameeduddin Aqil, founder of the Darul Uloom Hyderabad
- Muhammad Hamidullah (1908–2002), professor, translator of Quran into French, authored over a hundred books
- Sahib Husayni (1805–1880), Sufi saint from Hyderabad State; had a great influence over spiritual developments in the Deccan area; belonged to Qadiri Order; proponent of the concept of Wahdat al-Shuhood
- Syed Sultan Mahmoodullah Shah Hussaini, renowned Muslim Sufi, saint and scholar of the Quadri, Chisti order
- Inayat Khan (1882–1927), founder of the Sufi Order in the West
- M. A. Muqtedar Khan (b. 1966), reformist Islamic thinker and strong advocate of Ijtihad
- Abul Ala Maududi (1903–1979), Pakistani philosopher, founder of the Jamaat-e-Islami
- Sayyid Shamsullah Qadri, author and Scholar who wrote a history of Urdu literature, Urdu E Qadim (1925)
- Abdul Raheem Quraishi, Indian Islamic scholar who served as the president of Majlis-e-Tameer-e-Millat, a socio-religious organization based in Telangana and Andhra Pradesh, founded by Syed Khaleelullah Hussaini in the 1950s
- Ghousi Shah (1893–1954), Muslim Sufi saint and poet
- Hazrath Syed Kamalullah Shah, renowned Muslim Sufi, saint and scholar of the Quadri, Chisti order
- Kareemullah Shah (1838–1913), Muslim Sufi, saint and scholar of the Naqshbandi order
- Moulana Sahvi Shah, Sufi mystic, scholar, writer, and poet born in Hyderabad; founded the Conference of World Religions, and served as editor for Urdu weeklies like Jhalkian, Inquilab, and Al-Noor
- Muhammad Muslehuddin Siddiqui, Islamic scholar, migrated to Pakistan
- Rasheed Turabi, Islamic scholar
- Syed Sadatullah Husaini (1973) , the president (Amir) of Jamaat-e-Islami Hind (JIH) and Vice President of All India Muslim Personal Law Board (AIMPLB)

== Arts ==
- Asif Ali (b. 1988), American comedian
- Mahmood Ali (1928–2008), Pakistani television and radio artist
- Mast Ali, Indian actor
- Mohammad Irfan Ali, singer and winner of Jo Jeeta Wohi Super Star
- Sulaiman Areeb (1922–1972), Indian poet
- Talat Aziz (b. 1965), ghazal singer
- Shabana Azmi (b. 1950), Bollywood actress
- Zeshan Bagewadi, American singer, multi-instrumentalist, songwriter and recording artist with family roots from Hyderabad
- Mohammad Ali Baig, theater personality and ad film maker; Padma Shri recipient
- Fatima Surayya Bajia (1930–2016), Pakistani Urdu novelist, playwright and drama writer
- Aditi Rao Hydari, Bollywood actress
- Kamal Irani (1932–1989), Pakistani film actor
- Sana Javed, Pakistani television actress
- Adnan Sajid Khan, Indian comedian and actor, popularly known by his stage named Gullu Dada and Gullu Bhai
- Ajit Khan (1922–1998), Bollywood actor
- Ateeq Hussain Khan (b. 1980), qawwali musician
- Bade Ghulam Ali Khan (1902–1968), Hindustani classical musician and vocalist
- Bahauddin Khan (1934–2006), Pakistani qawwali musician; used to perform in the court of the Nizam
- Inayat Khan (1882–1927), Indian classical musician and Sufi leader
- Kabir Khan, Indian film director, screenwriter and cinematographer
- Razak Khan (1951–2016), Bollywood actor
- Shahrukh Khan (b. 1965), Bollywood actor (half Hyderabadi)
- Anwar Maqsood (b. 1940), Pakistani playwright and satirist
- Ghulam Mohiuddin, Pakistani actor with roots from Hyderabad India
- Mumtaz (b. 1947), Bollywood actress
- Aziz Naser (b. 1980), actor and film director
- Irshad Panjatan (b. 1931), actor and mime artist
- Aziz Qaisi (1931–1992), Urdu poet, short story writer, and film writer
- Munshi Raziuddin (1912–2003), Pakistani qawwali musician; used to perform in the court of the Nizam
- Waheeda Rehman (b. 1938), Bollywood actress and classical dancer; Padma Bhushan recipient
- Ahmed Rushdi (1934–1983), Pakistani playback singer
- Nigar Sultana (1932–2000), Bollywood actress
- Tabu (b. 1971), Bollywood actress; Padma Shri recipient
- Sharmila Tagore (b. 1944), Bollywood actress
- Zubaida Tariq (1945–2018), Pakistani chef and cooking expert
- Warsi Brothers, qawwali musicians
- Subhani Ba Yunus (1931–2006), Pakistani actor and television and radio personality
- Surayya Tyabji - (1919–1978), Indian artist who designed the current Indian national flag
- Lena Khan - Film Director, Producer and Writer

== Academics ==
- Mehdi Hasan, British-American broadcaster, journalist, and founder of the media company Zeteo
- Syed Ali Bilgrami (1851–1911) - An Indian scholar and linguist
- Abid Hussain, Indian economist, civil servant and diplomat; India's ambassador to the United States 1990–1992; member of the Planning Commission 1985–1990
- Ali Yavar Jung (1906–1976), served as vice-chancellor of the Osmania University as well as the Aligarh Muslim University
- Arastu Yar Jung (1858–1940), chief physician and advisor to the Nizam
- Nizamath Jung Bahadur (1871- 1955) - High court judge of Hyderabad State and author
- Omar Khalidi (1953–2010), Muslim scholar, staff member of MIT in the US, and author
- Mohammed Vizarat Rasool Khan (1946–2013), founder of Shadan Group of Institutions
- Syed Ahmed Quadri (1908–1990), administrator, educator, and senior officer in the government of the Nizam of Hyderabad and later in the government of India and the UNO
- Muhammad Zia ud-Din, served as the acting vice-chancellor of Federal Urdu University, having an Alvi Urdu-speaking (Muhajir) Hyderabadi Muslim background
- Ghulam Yazdani, Indian archaeologist; one of the founders of the Archaeological Department during the colonial-era reign of Nizam of Hyderabad
- Faizan Zaki, first Muslim to win the 2025 Scripps National Spelling Bee

== Scientists ==
- Saleh Muhammad Alladin, among the most famous 100 astronomers of the world and served as the educational advisor to former president APJ Abdul Kalam of India
- Ahmed Mohiuddin (1923–1998), founder of the Pakistan Zoological Society, wrote 37 books on scientific research
- Aneesur Rahman (1927–1987), physicist
- Raziuddin Siddiqui (1908–1998), theoretical physicist; member of imperial Britain's nuclear physicist delegation; participated in nuclear weapons programs of the US (Manhattan Project) and UK (Tube Alloys Project)

== Politics ==
- Mahmood Ali (b. 1952), Indian politician, deputy chief minister of Telangana 2014–2018
- Mir Laiq Ali, last prime minister of Hyderabad State
- Shabbir Ali, minister during Indian National Congress rule in AP
- Maulvi Allauddin (1824–1889), revolutionary and Indian independence activist
- Mohammed Hameeduddin, American former politician and the former mayor of Teaneck, New Jersey
- Ghazala Hashmi, American politician serving as Lieutenant Governor of Virginia since 2026
- Mohammad Majid Hussain, former mayor of Hyderabad
- Sir Akbar Hydari (1869–1941), former prime minister of Hyderabad
- Sir Muhammad Saleh Akbar Hydari (1894–1948), former governor of Assam
- Imtiyaz Jaleel (1968), Indian politician
- Ali Yavar Jung (1906–1976), former governor of Maharashtra
- Bahadur Yar Jung, prominent figure of the Pakistan movement
- Mehdi Nawaz Jung (1894–1967), former governor of Gujarat
- Akbar Ali Khan (1899–1994), former governor of Uttar Pradesh and governor of Orissa
- Suhail A. Khan, American conservative political activist
- Turrebaz Khan (?–1859), revolutionary and war hero of the Indian War of Independence
- Idris Hasan Latif (1923–2018), former governor of Maharashta
- Makhdoom Mohiuddin (1908–1969), communist activist of the Telangana Rebellion
- Hassan Nasir, Pakistani communist activist
- Akbaruddin Owaisi (b. 1970), MLA from Chandrayangutta constituency
- Asaduddin Owaisi (b. 1969), president of AIMIM and member of Parliament
- Sultan Salahuddin Owaisi (1931–2008), served six terms as member of Parliament; former AIMIM president
- Sayyid Ahmedullah Qadri (1909–1985), Indian independence activist
- Syed Ahmed Pasha Quadri, politician
- Qazi Saleem (1930–2005), Indian politician and Indian Urdu poet
- Nabeela Syed, American politician and Democratic member of the Illinois House of Representatives from the 51st district

== Military services ==
- Moin-Ud-Daula Bahadur (1891–1941), an Indian nobleman and member of the Paigah Nobility and the Amir of the Asman Jahi Paigah one of the 3 great Paigahs of Hyderabad State
- S. M. Ahsan (1920–1989), admiral and former commander-in-chief, Pakistan Navy; recipient of the United Kingdom's Distinguished Service Order military medal
- Captain Mateen Ansari (1916–1943), British Indian Army officer; graduate of Indian Military Academy; served in the British Indian Army as a part of the 5th Battalion, 7th Rajput Regiment in World War II; posthumous recipient of the George Cross
- Muhammad Ali Beg (1852–1930), Indian military leader from Hyderabad State, serving there and in the British Indian Army
- Syed Ahmed El Edroos (1899–1962), veteran of both World Wars; last commander-in-chief of the Hyderabad State Army
- Moinuddin Haider (b. 1942), retired three-star rank general of the Pakistan Army, who later served as the governor and chief minister (chief executive) of Sindh, and then as the federal Interior Minister of Pakistan
- Abid Hasan (d. 1984), major in the Azad Hind Fauj
- Shahid Karimullah, admiral and former four-star naval officer; chief of Naval Staff (CNS), Pakistan Navy, 2002–2005; graduate of the United States Naval War College; recipient of the United States military Legion of Merit medal and French military Légion d'honneur (Legion of Honour) medal; former senior officer of the Pakistan Navy Elite Special Service Group (Navy), SSGN commando division
- Hashim Ali Khan, commandant of the 2nd Lancers, Hyderabad Imperial Service Troops
- Sami Khan, former lieutenant general of the Indian Army; former Commandant of Indian National Defence Academy
- Idris Hasan Latif (1923–2018), former chief of Air Staff, Indian Air Force
- Jameel Mahmood (1938–1997), commander-in-chief (GOC-in-C), Eastern Command of the Indian Army
- Sultan Mehmood, former major general of the Indian Army
- Talat Masood (b. 1928), retired three-star rank army general, political commentator, and mechanical engineer
- Kamal Matinuddin (1926–2017), Pakistani general, diplomat, and military historian; wrote on Pakistan's foreign policy, nuclear policy, and military history
- Mohammad Ahmed Zaki (b. 1935), former lieutenant general and director general of the Indian Army Infantry
- Syed Ali Akbar (1890) - commander of the Paigah army in Hyderabad State
- Shamsher Ali Khan Jamadar (later Risaldar) in 1st Hyderabad Imperial Service Lancers. Travelled to Egypt during world war 1 as part of the British 15th (Imperial Service) Cavalry Brigade During the Great War 1914–1918.

== Administrators, civil servants and diplomats ==
- Ali Yavar Jung (1906–1976), served as the Indian ambassador to Argentina (1952–54), Egypt (1954–58), Yugoslavia and Greece (1958–61), France (1961–65), and the United States (1968–70)
- Abid Hasan (1911–1984), served as India's ambassador to Denmark
- Abid Hussain (1926–2012), IAS; served as India's ambassador to the United States 1990–1992
- Ausaf Sayeed (b. 1963), IFS; served as India's ambassador to Saudi Arabia and Yemen and high commissioner to Seychelles
- Mohammed Asad Ullah Sayeed (1918–1997), IAS, served as district collector of East Godawari, Khammam and Mahbubnagar districts in erstwhile Andhra Pradesh
- Shirin R. Tahir-Kheli, former director of political military affairs, United States National Security Council, US; former research professor at Johns Hopkins University Foreign Policy Institute at the Paul H. Nitze School of Advanced International Studies, in Washington DC, US
- Sohail Mohammed, New Jersey Superior Court judge, 2011
- Abdul Razack, judicial member, Income Tax Appellate Tribunal, Government of India (1992–2003)
- Kazi Zainul Abedin (1892–1962), Urdu poet and an officer in the Government of the Nizam of Hyderabad; the last Kazi of Udgir under the Hyderabad State
- Mehdi Nawaz Jung, 1st governor of Gujarat
- Zain Yar Jung - was an architect. He served as the Chief Architect of Hyderabad State.
- Viqar-ul-Umra (1856–1902) - Prime Minister of Hyderabad State

== Sports ==
=== Cricket ===
- Ghulam Ahmed (1922–1998), former test captain of the Indian Cricket Team
- Arshad Ayub (b. 1958), played 13 tests and 32 ODIs
- Mohammad Azharuddin (b. 1963), former captain of the Indian Cricket Team; Padma Shri recipient
- Abbas Ali Baig (b. 1939), played 10 tests
- Murtuza Baig (b. 1941), first class cricketer
- Asif Iqbal (b. 1943), cricketer, former captain of the Pakistan cricket team
- Samad Fallah (b. 1985), first class cricketer
- Mohammed Siraj
- Waheed Yar Khan
- Khlid Qayyum (b. 1958), Indian former cricketer
- Mohammad Nadeemuddin (b. 1982), Indian former cricketer
- Mohammad Mohiuddin (b. 1977), Indian former cricketer
- Mohammad Ghouse Baba (b. 1978), Indian former cricketer
- Syed Mehdi Hasan (b. 1990), Indian cricketer who plays for Hyderabad
- Mohammed Khader (b. 1987), Indian cricketer
- Syed Mohammed Hadi (1899–1971), first class cricketer
- Mohammad Muddassir (b. 1992), Indian cricketer
- Syed Ahmed Quadri (b. 1908), first class cricketer
- Ghulam Qureshi (1918–1994), first class cricketer

=== Football ===
- Hussain Ahmed (1932–2021), represented the Indian national football team at the 1956 Summer Olympics
- Shabbir Ali (b. 1956), recipient of India's highest award for lifetime achievement in sports, the Dhyan Chand Award
- Syed Shahid Hakim (b. 1939), represented India at the 1960 Summer Olympics
- H. H. Hamid (b. 1942), represented the Indian team that finished as runners up in the 1964 AFC Asian Cup
- Yousuf Khan (1937–2006), represented India at the 1960 Summer Olympics
- Syed Moinuddin (1924–1978), played as a forward, represented the Hyderabad City Police club and the India national team (e.g., in the 1952 Summer Olympics)
- Syed Nayeemuddin (b. 1944), former captain of the Indian football team
- Syed Abdul Rahim (1909–1963), former head coach of India national football team
- Mohammed Zulfiqaruddin (1936–2019), Indian association football player who played for the India national football team

=== Tennis ===
- Syed Mohammed Hadi (1899–1971), represented British India at the 1924 Summer Olympics
- Khanum Haji
- Sania Mirza (b. 1986), former World No.1 and winner of six Grand Slam titles

=== Other sports ===
- S. M. Arif (b. 1944), badminton
- Abdul Basith, volleyball
- Syed Mohammed Hadi, hockey
- Mir Mohtesham Ali Khan, bodybuilding
- Abdul Najeeb Qureshi (b. 1988), sprint

== Engineering ==
- Ali Nawaz Jung, former chief engineer of Hyderabad State

== Social work ==
- Victor Begg, American author, philanthropist and community leader
- Shahnaz Bukhari, Pakistani human rights activist with family roots linked to Hyderabad, noted for her pioneering work against domestic violence and women's rights
- Amina Hydari (1878–1939), known for her work during the Great Musi Flood
- Asma Jahangir (1952–2018), primarily associated with Pakistan but had ancestral roots tracing back to Hyderabad; human rights lawyer and activist, co-founder of the Human Rights Commission of Pakistan
- Zehra Ali Yavar Jung, founder of Society For Clean Cities (SCC); Padma Bhushan recipient
- Bilkees I. Latif (1931–2017), known for her work in the slums of Mumbai; Padma Shri recipient
- Khalida Parveen, social and human rights activist and women's social leader, president of Amoomat Society, Hyderabad

== Asaf Jahi dynasty ==
=== Nizams of Hyderabad ===
- Asaf Jah I
- Asaf Jah II
- Asaf Jah III
- Asaf Jah IV
- Asaf Jah V
- Asaf Jah VI
- Asaf Jah VII

=== Descendants of Asaf Jah VII ===
- Azam Jah
- Moazzam Jah
- Mukarram Jah
- Muffakham Jah
- Azmet Jah
- Mir Najaf Ali Khan

== See also ==
- Hyderabadi Muslims
