= Qaderi =

Qaderi (also transcribed variously as Qadri, Qadiri, Qadry, Kadri, or Quadri) is an Arabic/Islamic surname. It is associated with the Sufi saint Abdul Qadir Gilani or the Qadiriyya order founded by him.

People with the name include:

== Qaderi ==
- Ali Qaderi (born 1994), Qatari footballer
- Habibullah Qaderi (born 1961), Afghan Minister for Counter Narcotics
- Nazem Qaderi, Lebanese lawyer, politician, MP and government minister
- Shivan Qaderi (died 2005), Iranian murder victim

== Qadri ==
- Qadri Jamil, Syrian politician, media editor and economist
- Abdul Hamid Qadri Badayuni (1898–1970), Pakistani Islamic scholar
- Altaf Qadri (born 1976), Indian photojournalist
- Arshadul Qadri (1925–2002), Indian Islamic scholar associated with the Barelvi movement
- Mohammad Badshah Qadri (1903–1978), Indian Sufi saint from Raichur
- Ibrahim Raza Khan (1907–1965), 20th-century Indian Islamic scholar of the Barelvi movement
- Mahir ul Qadri (1906–1978), Pakistani poet
- Mir Suhail Qadri (born 1989), Indian political cartoonist
- Mohiuddin Qadri Zore (1905–1962), Indian Urdu poet
- Muhammad Ilyas Qadri, Pakistani scholar of the Sunni and Sufi sect in Islam
- Muhammad Tahir-ul-Qadri (born 1951), Pakistani politician, former law professor and a Sufi scholar
- Nasreen Qadri, now Nasrin Kadri (born 1986), Israeli singer of traditional and pop Middle Eastern and Mizrahi music
- Sadikshah Qadri (1918–1978), Indian Sufi saint
- Shah Inayat Qadiri
- Shad Qadri (born 1952), Pakistani-Canadian politician and businessman
- Shahid Qadri (1942–2016), Bangladeshi poet and writer
- Sohan Qadri (1932–2011), Danish yogi, poet and painter of Indian origin
- Sayed Mehboob Shah Qadri, Indian social reformer
- Syed Shujaat Ali Qadri (1941–1993), member of the Pakistani Council of Islamic Ideology and scholar of Islamic Sciences
- Umar Al-Qadri, Islamic scholar based in Ireland
- Sayyid Shamsullah Qadri (1885–1953), Indian scholar, writer and historian
- Sayyid Ahmedullah Qadri (1909–1985), Indian journalist, writer, translator, literary critic, educationist and politician
- Nasreen Qadri (born 1986), Israeli-Jewish singer
- Ziaul Mustafa Razvi Qadri, Indian Islamic scholar
- Zeishan Quadri, Indian filmmaker
- Qadri Shaheen (born 1986 in Nablus city), Palestinian Scholar in Construction Engineering and Project Management.

== Qadry ==
- Noura Qadry (born 1954), Egyptian actress
- Sa Anun Al Qadry (born 1980), Indonesian footballer
- Zohdy Qadry (born 1972), Palestinian painter

== Quadri ==
- Ameen Mian Quadri (born 1955), Indian Sufi leader
- Samar Quadri (born 1989), Indian cricketer
- Sayeed Quadri (born 1960), Indian lyricist and poet in Bollywood
- Shah Rasheed Ahmed Quadri, Indian bidriware craftsman
- Shujaat Ali Quadri, Indian Journalist
- Syed Quadri, Indian domestic cricketer
- Syed Ahmed Quadri, Indian administrator and academic
- Syed Ahmed Pasha Quadri, Indian politician
- Syed Mohammad Sharfuddin Quadri (1901–2015), Indian independence activist
- Syed Shah Mohammed Quadri (born 1938), former judge of the Supreme Court of India
- Zeishan Quadri, Indian writer, actor, director and producer
- Naela Quadri Baloch, Balochistani politician
