= Lutfuddaulah Oriental Research Institute =

Indian research institute

Coordinates: 26°10′21.21″N 75°47′47.89″E

Lutfuddaulah Oriental Research Institute is an Indian research institute in the state of Hyderabad. It was named after Nawab Lutf ud-Dowlah Muhammad Lutf ud-Din Khan Bahadur Latafat Jang (16 July 1883 – 31 March 1937) and was founded by Hakeem Sayyid Shamsullah Qadri circa 1937.

== History ==
Nawab Lutf ud-Dawlah Bahadur was the son of Nawab Shams ul-Mulk Shams ud-Dawlah Muhammad Hafiz ud-Din Khan Bahadur Zafar Jung and the grandson of Amir i Ka-bir Shams ul-Umara Nawab Sir Khurshid Jah Muhammad Muhi-ud-Din Khan Bahadur Tegh Jang, K.C.I.E., and Princess Husain un-Nisa Begam (eldest daughter of Afzal ad-Dawlah, Asaf Jah V).

In the month of December, 1936, Nawab Lutf ud-Dawlah Bahadur traveled to Vienna to undergo medical treatment, dying on his way back to Haidarabad.

In memory of Nawab Lutfuddawlah the Lutfuddaulah Oriental Research institute was Established circa 1937 by Hakeem Sayyid Shamsullah qadri at Hyderabad Deccan.

== Focus ==
The institute hosts rare collections in Religion, Geography, Biography, History, Generalities, Language, Linguistics, Literature, Ethics and Social Sciences assembled by Hakeem Sayyid Shamsullah Qadri. It was the focal point in Hyderabad for research and editing of manuscripts.

Students of Masters of Arts (Urdu, Persian, Arabic languages) and others, have worked at the institute.

Many researchers did their PhD thesis work there. Many Memorial Series were published there.

== Memorial Series Board ==
=== President ===
- Chief Justice, Nawab Jiwan Yar Jung Bahadur, B.A., (Cantab.) Bar-at-Law.

=== Members ===
- Justice, Nawab Alam yar jung Bahadur, M. A., LL.B,. Bar-at-Law (Oxon.).
- Justice, Nawab Asghar Yar Jung Bahadur, B.A., (Oxon.) Bar-at-Law.
- Rai Wittinal Rai, Member, Executive Committee,.
- Paigah of Nawab Lutf ud-Dawlah Bahadur.
- Sayyid Ahmedullah Qadri.

=== Secretary and Treasurer ===
- Sayyid Sa'ad-Ullah Qadri.
