= Mubarez-ud-Daulah =

Mir Gowhar Ali Khan Siddiqi
- Mubarez-ud-Daulah, Mubaraz Jung
- Born: Mir Gowhar Ali Khan Siddiqi; 18 March 1798; Purani Haveli, Hyderabad, Hyderabad state
- Died: 25 June 1854 (aged 56); Golconda Fort, Hyderabad, Hyderabad state
- Burial: Dargah of Hassan Barhane Shah
- Issue: 4
- House: Asaf Jah
- Father: Sikandar Jah
- Mother: Chandi Begum
- Religion: Islam

Mir Gowhar Ali Khan Siddiqi (18 March 1798 – 25 June 1854), commonly known as Mubarez-ud-Daulah was a member of the Asaf Jahi dynasty of Hyderabad State. A son of Nizam Sikandar Jah, he was influenced by the Wahhabi movement and wanted to overthrow the East India Company and defeat his elder brother and Nizam Nasir-ud-Daulah. However, his plans were intercepted by Resident James Stuart Fraser and he was arrested by the Nizam.

== Early life ==
Mubarez-ud-Daulah was born as Mir Gowhar Ali Khan Siddiqi Bahadur at Purani Haveli, Hyderabad on 18 March 1798. His father Sikandar Jah was the third Nizam of Hyderabad. Mubarez-ud-Daulah's mother was Chandi Begum. His elder brother was Nasir-ud-Daulah, the seventh Nizam.

== Wahhabi uprising ==
The Wahhabi movement was popularised in India by Shah Ismail Dehlvi in the 18th century. Mubarez-ud-Daulah was inspired by the Wahhabi movement. He had become fiercely opposed to the presence of the East India Company since his childhood, when upon the advice of Company officials, his father Sikandar Jah had imprisoned him in 1815 for five years. According to Thomas Herbert Maddock, Mubarez-ud-Daulah was instrumental in spreading the Wahhabi movement in the Deccan region.

Rasool Khan, the Nawab of Kurnool was also influenced by the movement. When Mubarez-ud-Daulah came to know about it, he struck a secret deal with him. According to the deal, Rasool Khan would set up a secret arsenal to manufacture arms. In return, Mubarez-ud-Daulah would provide monetary help.

In c. 1835, a rumour spread that a Russian army was advancing towards India from Central Asia. It was also believed that the combined armies of Mubarez-ud-Daulah and Rasool Khan would overthrown the East India Company and defeat Nizam Nasir-ud-Daulah. Subsequently, the Maratha Empire would be restored and Mubarez-ud-Daulah would be appointed subahdar of Deccan by Mohammad Shah Qajar, the Shah of Persia.

James Stuart Fraser, the then Resident of Hyderabad, discovered their plans through his network of spies. He cautioned the Nizam about the conspiracy hatched against them. Fraser believed that Mubarez-ud-Daulah was using Wahhabism as a disguise to "fulfill his personal ambitions" and to usurp his elder brother. In June 1839, the Nizam send 10,000 troops to put down the uprising.

On 15 June 1839, Mubarez-ud-Daulah was arrested from his palace by Nizam's troops. Along with him, forty-six Wahhabi preachers were arrested from Hyderabad. The Resident and the Nizam set up a Judicial Enquiry Commission. The commission found him guilty of conspiring with Rasool Khan to overthrow the East India Company and the Nizam. The commission also believed that he was trying to spread sedition amongst the Muslim soldiers of Secunderabad.

Subsequently, Mubarez-ud-Daulah was imprisoned at the Golconda Fort. He died as a state prisoner on 25 June 1854.

== Personal life ==
Mubarez-ud-Daulah's full name with titles is Mubarez-ud-Daulah, Nawab Mir Gowhar Ali Khan Siddiqi Bahadur, Mubaraz Jung. He had four sons:

Name	Born	Died	Children
Mir Ahmed Ali Khan Siddiqi	6 July 1822	c. 1875	3 sons
Mir Sultan Ali Khan Siddiqi	3 February 1825	unknown	5 sons
Mir Fath Ali Khan Siddiqi	28 July 1828	21 February 1859	4 sons
Mir Abid Ali Khan Siddiqi	21 November 1836	unknown	7 sons

== Notes ==
- Mallampalli, Chandra (2017), A Muslim Conspiracy in British India?, Cambridge University Press, ISBN 9781107196254
- Chand, Tara (1965), History of Freedom Movement in India - Vol 2, Volume 1, Publications Division Ministry of Information & Broadcasting, ISBN 9788123024479
