= Jama'iat-i-Sikhan =

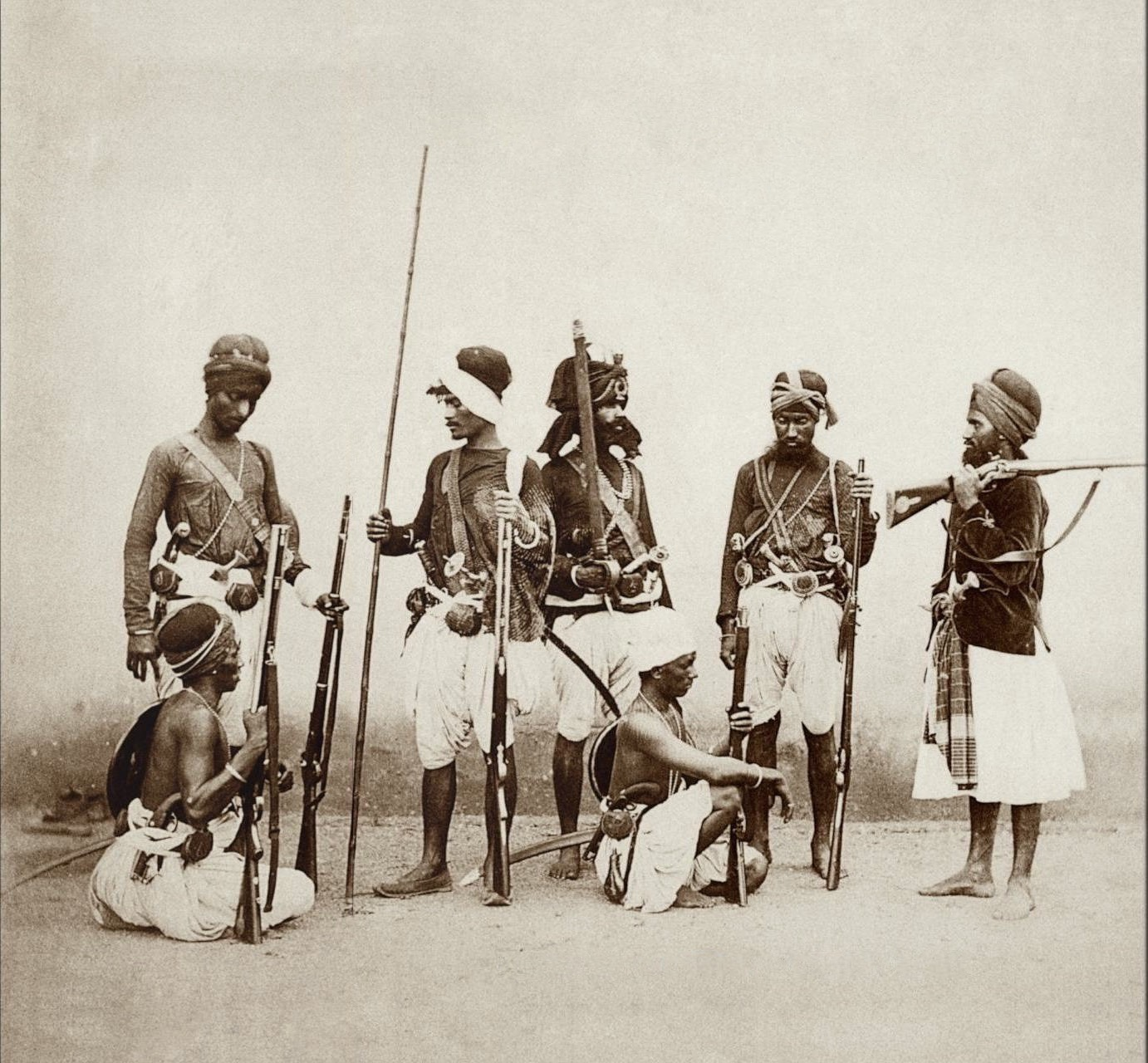
Photograph of a group of armed Sikh irregulars of the Jama'iat-i-Sikhan, ca.1865

The Jama'iat-i-Sikhan ("assemblage of Sikhs") were an irregular force of Sikh soldiers serving the Nizam of Hyderabad in the 19th and 20th centuries, consistings largely of Akali-Nihangs. They were part of the Dakhni Sikh community, being connected to the shrine of Takht Hazur Sahib. Due to being located far-away from the Sikh homeland of Punjab, the Sikh irregulars were able to maintain martial traditions that had disappeared in Punjab after the Second Anglo-Sikh War and subsequent annexation of the Punjab in 1849. The irregular force policed the rural areas, as unlike urban areas the police administration was not effective or existing there.

== History ==
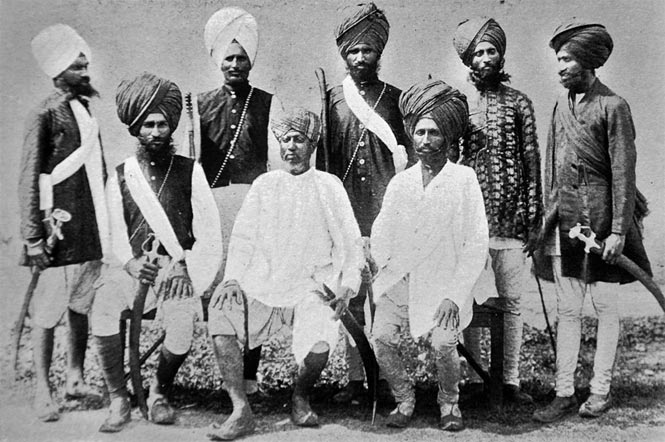
Group photograph of Dakhni Sikh police officers serving the Nizam of Hyderabad State, circa late 19th century

Chandu Lal, a Deccani Sikh, had established the force in the early 19th century by employing Sikh bodyguards against Arab and Rohilla mercenaries and a force of Sikh irregulars for policing and collecting revenue. The tradition of the force was maintained by the successors of Chandu Lal. The force recruited from the Sikh colony of Nanded. The force was used to collect land revenue from hostile landlords and suppressed rebellions. Jama'iat-i-Sikhan irregulars were arranged under a zillahdar (special police officers) and stationed at nakas (police-stations) to control the dacoities, robberies, and riots by Pashtuns and Arabs. In 1832, an alliance was made between Maharaja Ranjit Singh of the Sikh Empire and Nizam Sikandar Jah, with the former sending 1,200 Sikh soldiers to the Deccan to serve the Nizam. They were not affected by the Dalhausian reforms in Punjab after 1849 due to being distant. In April 1851, the Nizam paid 100,000 rupees to the irregular Sikh force at Ananthagiri, which led to in-fighting in regards to the distribution of the funds between them.
