= Syed Ahmed Quadri =

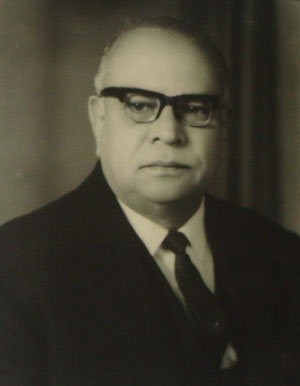
- Syed Ahmed Quadri in 1989
- Born: 1908; Tekmal, Hyderabad Deccan
- Died: 16 May 1990 (aged 81–82); Hyderabad, India
- Citizenship: Indian
- Occupations: Government servant, educationist, reformer
- Known for: Administrator
- Relatives: Syed Sahib Hussaini, Kazi Zainul Abedin, Syed Asif Quadri

Syed Ahmed Quadri (Urdu: سيد احمد قادري) was an administrator, educator, and senior officer in the government of the Nizam of Hyderabad and later on in the government of India and the UNO.

== Ancestry ==
His lineage traces back to the fourth Caliph Ali ibn Abi Talib. He was also a direct descendant of the famous Sufi Shaykh Abdul Qadir Gilani (1077–1166) and his great grandfather was the Sufi shaykh of Tekmal Sayyid Sahib Husayni (1805–1880). Thus, he was brought up in a Sufi tradition.

His ancestors migrated from Baghdad first to Allahabad in north India, and then shifted south to Tekmal adopting this town as their permanent native place.

== Early life and education ==
Syed Ahmed was barely ten years old when his parents died. His eldest sister Ghousia Begum and her husband Mr. Syed Abdul Quader Hussaini, ex-Collector Gulbarga became his immediate guardians henceforth and he spent his youth at their home.

Immediately after his schooling, he pursued higher education in science at Aligarh Muslim University and Osmania University, Hyderabad. With an excellent educational record, he was sent then to England for further higher studies, where he received BSc(Hons) degree in Physics from Manchester University in 1933.

== In university sports ==
Quadri also enjoyed some success in sports. He was captain of the hockey team, a member of the Football Team, and swimming champion of Aligarh Muslim University during 1924–1929. He held records in long distance swimming and represented the Muslim contingent in a quadrangular All India Water Polo Championship between Muslims, Christians, Hindus and Others (including Parsis).

He won 7 Gold Medals as a part of the Aligarh Muslim University hockey and football teams in All India Championships.

He was also the Tennis Blue of Manchester University in 1933. Thereafter, he was presented with the honour of "BLUE" of all English Universities in 1933.

== Career in education ==
Immediately on his return from England in 1933, he opted to go into the field of education. He was appointed a lecturer in Physics at Osmania University.

In 1939, at the break of World War, his services were acquired as an expert in education and training by the Hyderabad State for heading "Technical Training and Recruitment Scheme". During this period, he developed this program on an institutional basis. As a result, these schemes were converted into permanent government departments in the Nizam's government. After 1947, the government of India adopted this model and this exists in the form of the ITI (Industrial Training Institute) and Employment Exchange.

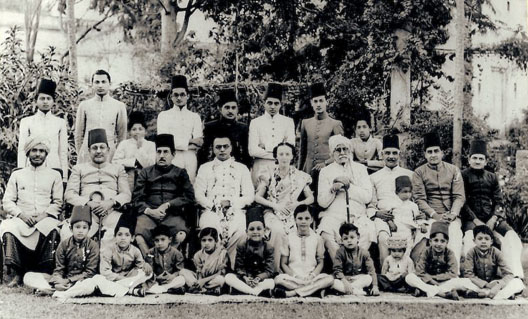
Syed Ahmed Quadri (center seated with his wife) with other members of his family on occasion of award of "Khan Saheb" title by the British Govt of India in 1943

== National award of "Khan Saheb" ==
This title was given to him in 1943 by the British government of India, which is equivalent to the title of "Padma Shree" of India today. After independence of India, Syed Ahmed Quadri decided to return this title in deference to the newly independent state of India.

== Career in government ==
By that time, he was recognised as an expert in transportation and logistics. In 1947, he was moved to the Nizam's State Railways. His services were specifically transferred to "Road Transport Department" which is currently known as Andhra Pradesh State Road Transport Corporation (APSRTC).

== Government career after independence ==
In 1948, the State of Hyderabad was invaded by the Indian troops, and annexed to India. Syed Ahmed Quadri subsequently became a part of the Indian government and continued to function in a similar capacity in the Road Transport Department.

During State reorganisation scheme in 1957, he was transferred from Hyderabad State to Mysore State and appointed to the post of Chief Traffic Manager of Mysore State. It was during his tenure that he reorganised road transport in the state, and was instrumental in nationalising the road transport and converting it into "Mysore State Road Transport Corporation" (MSRTC), which is now known as "Karnataka State Road Transport Corporation" (KSRTC).

At the age of 58, he retired from Mysore government service in 1966, and opted to return to his native Hyderabad city. He was already well known for his performance, and the Andhra Pradesh government offered to take him as Director of APSRTC to reorganise the passenger services in Andhra Pradesh. He served in this position for nearly a year until 1967 when he joined the UNO.

== Career with UNO ==
In the meantime, he was already being considered as a key technocrat by the United Nations Organization. In January 1967 United Nations Organization (UNO) obtained his valuable services as the "World Food Project Officer". His first assignment that year was based out of Yemen.

During the course of 1967, the security situation in Yemen went out of control with the rebellion against the British in South Yemen, which also led to independence of South Yemen in November 1967. As a result, Mr. Quadri was evacuated from Yemen with other UN staff to Cairo. During the next few months, he was posted temporarily to Cyprus and Rome before he was posted to Amman, Jordan where he remained for three years until 1971. He was then posted to Baghdad until 1975 when he retired from the UNO.

During this period, he was also appointed as UN Advisor to the developing countries of the Middle East of Yemen, Egypt, Jordan and Iraq.

He thus served in the Middle East for a period of 8 years. During this period, he developed a number of schemes which were approved and implemented by United Nations as well as the concerned countries.

While he served in the Middle East, he performed Hajj thrice. During the Hajj of 1972, he was pained to see the loss of lives of some pilgrims due to indiscipline and disorder. As a service to the Hajj authorities and the Muslims at large, he prepared a detailed report in English and Arabic with suggestions on a number of issues to improve services for the Hajj pilgrims. This report was sent through the offices of the United Nations to Saudi Arabia and other Arab countries. In subsequent years, most of his proposals were accepted and implemented by the Saudi government. Some of his suggestions included:

1. Construction of two floors over Al-Safa and Al-Marwah to allow maximum number of pilgrims to perform the ritual with ease. 2. Establishment of separate paths for the passage of to and fro traffic between Al-Safa and Al-Marwah. 3. Arrangement of wheel chairs for aged, elderly, weak and handicapped pilgrims for their rituals inside the holy mosque. 4. Construction of a number of roads to Mina and Mount Arafat instead of only one that existed then, by carving different obstructing hillocks to for ease of the ever-increasing Hajj traffic. 5. Establishing separate incoming and outgoing paths and constructing floors over the Jamarat at Mina. 6. Packaging the sacrificial meat for distribution to poor people in other Muslim countries.

== Death ==
Quadri died after a short illness on Wednesday, 16 May 1990 at Hyderabad, and was buried at the ancestral graveyard at Tekmal.

== Publications ==
Syed Ahmed Quadri wrote a number of books on Tekmal, astronomy and numerology in Urdu and English. Some of his books include:

1. History of Takemal Dargah, Hyderabad, 1985
2. A New Lease of Life to Tekmal, Hyderabad, 1982
3. Shajar-i Ghawsiya Tekmal mein, Hyderabad, 1977
4. Karamat o Halat, Hyderabad, 1978
5. Mysteries of the Hand (a book on palmistry)

== Family ==
Quadri was married first to Mehrunnisa Begum (d. 10 December 2001), a British woman. He had met her during his days as a student in England and brought her back to Hyderabad as his wife in 1933. They had three children: Amina, Syed Asif Quadri, and Syed Arif Quadri. Mehrunnisa Begum returned to the UK after 18 years of marriage, and the couple were divorced in 1950.

Quadri was married to Azeemunnisa Begum (his distant cousin and a widow) from 1953 until her death in 1983.

His third sister was married to Kazi Zainul Abedin.

== See also ==
- List of Indians
- Sayyid Sahib Husayni
- Kazi Zainul Abedin
