= Kurnool State =

Kurnool state was a small princely state during the Company rule in India. It had its capital at the town of Kurnool in the present-day state of Andhra Pradesh and was eventually annexed by the East India Company.

== History ==
Kurnool State was established by a Pathan general. It was ruled by Nawabs until the British Government took over in 1839. Kurnool was initially under the suzerainty of the Nizam of Hyderabad. After the Nizam ceded the region to the East India Company, the nawab, Aluf Khan, agreed to pay a voluntary peishcush of rupees one lakh to the Company government.

=== Uprising against the company ===
Ghulam Rasul Khan Bahadur (died on 12 July 1840) was the last Nawab of Kurnool. He ruled from 1823 to 1839 until the kingdom was defeated by the East India Company.

The Wahhabi movement was popularised in India by Shah Ismail Dehlvi in the 18th century. Mubarez-ud-Daulah, younger brother of the Nizam of Hyderabad, Nasir-ud-Daulah, was inspired by the Wahhabi movement. According to Thomas Herbert Maddock, Mubarez-ud-Daulah was instrumental in spreading the Wahhabi movement in the Deccan region.

Nawab Rasool Khan of Kurnool was also influenced by the movement. When Mubarez-ud-Daulah learned of it, he struck a secret deal with him. According to the deal, Rasool Khan would set up a secret arsenal to manufacture arms. In return, Mubarez-ud-Daulah would provide monetary help.

In c. 1835, a rumor spread that a Russian army was advancing towards India from Central Asia. It was also believed that the combined armies of Mubarez-ud-Daulah and Rasool Khan had overthrown the East India Company and defeated Nizam Nasir-ud-Daulah. Subsequently, the Maratha Empire would be restored and Mubarez-ud-Daulah would be appointed subahdar of Deccan by Mohammad Shah Qajar, the Shah of Persia.

On 12 October 1839, a war broke out between British Indian Army and the kingdom and continued for six days until the king was detained on 18 October. He was subsequently sent to Tiruchirappalli Central Prison where he died on 12 July 1840.

== Rulers ==
List of the Pathan nawabs of Kurnool-

Nawab	Reign	
Nawab	From	Until
Khizr Khan Panni	1674	1677
Daud Khan Panni	1690	?
Ibrahim Khan Panni	?	1724
Alif Khan I	1724	1733
Himayat Bahadur Khan	1733	1751
Munawar Khan	1751	1792
Alif Khan II	1792	1815
Muzaffar Khan	1815	1816
Munawar Khan	1816	1823
Ghulam Rasul Khan	1824	1839

== See also ==
- Kurnool
- Company rule in India
- Andhra Pradesh
- List of princely states
