= Syed Hussain Bilgrami =

Indian civil servant, politician, leader and educationalist

Nawab Syed Hussain Bilgrami CSI
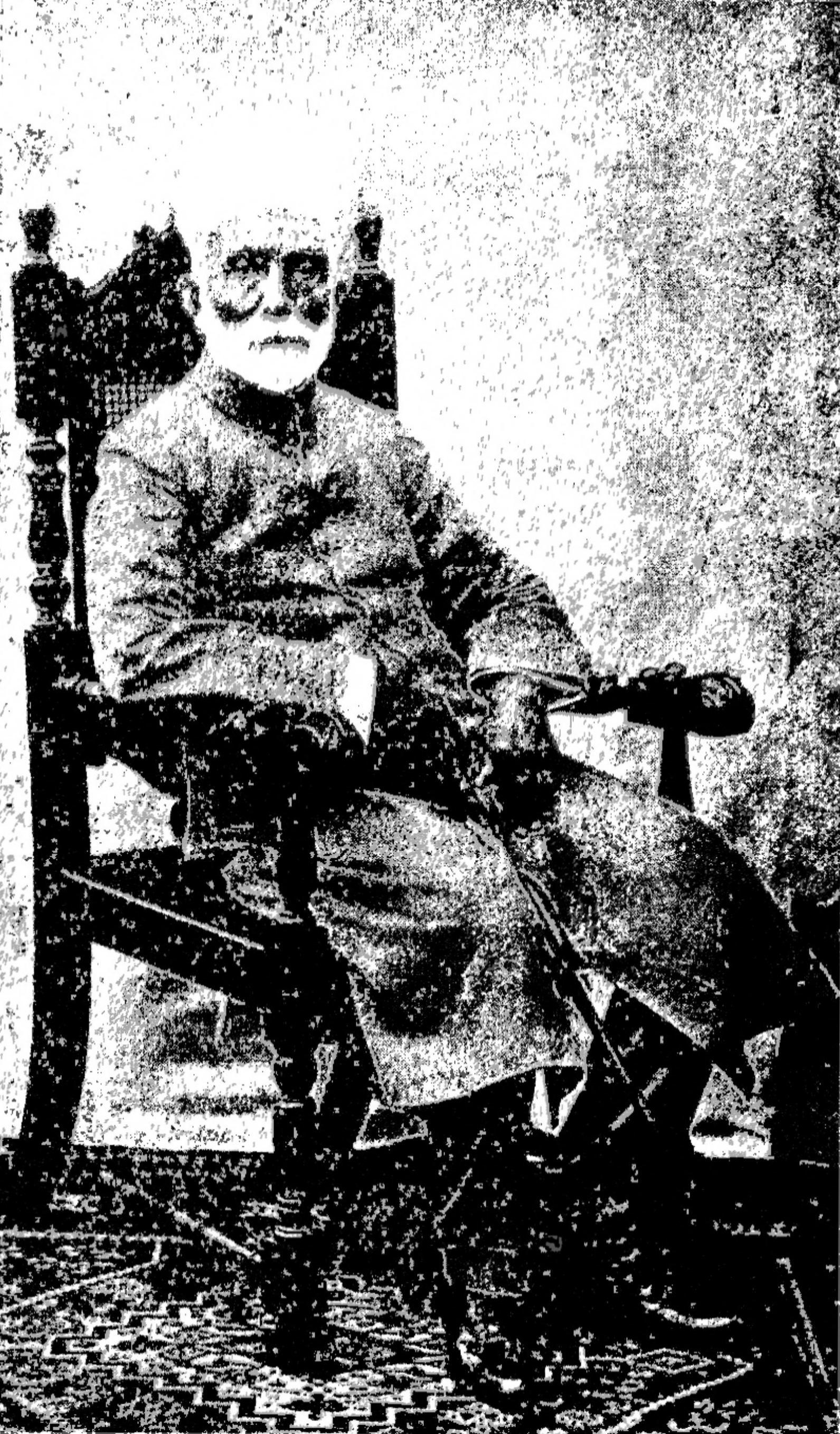
- Born: 1844
- Died: 1926 (aged 81–82)
- Education: Presidency College, Calcutta
- Relatives: Syed Ali Bilgrami (brother)

Nawab Syed Hussain Bilgrami, Imad-ul-Mulk Bahadur, CSI (1842-1926) was an Indian civil servant, politician, educationalist and an early leader of the All India Muslim League.

== Early life ==
Syed Hussain Bilgrami was born in 1844 in Gaya from ancestors of Sadaat-e-Bilgram, and was educated at the Presidency College, Calcutta. His brother was Syed Ali Bilgrami. He was married in 1864 and had four sons and one daughter.

== Career ==
After holding the post of Professor of Arabic at Canning College, Lucknow from 1866 to 1873 he entered the service of the Nizam of Hyderabad. He was the Private Secretary to Sir Salar Jung till his death. During his tenure, Sir Hussain Bilgrami accompanied Sir Salar Jung on a memorable mission to England where he had the honour of meeting and speaking with Queen Victoria and also of meeting other distinguished people such as Disraeli, Gladstone, Lord Salisbury, John Morley and others.

Later, he was Private Secretary to the Nizam of Hyderabad in a number of roles. He was made the Director of Public Instruction for the Nizam's Dominions from 1887 to 1902. In 1901-1902 he was a member of Indian Universities Commission 1902. Soon afterwards he was made a member of the Imperial Legislative Council and a member of the Secretary of State's Council from 1907 to 1909. He retired from the service of the Nizam in 1907 as a result of ill health.

His most important work was that of an educationalist. He founded the institution that was to become Nizam College. He along with Sir Agha Khan (Agha Khan III) and many others was one of the founding members of the "All-India Muslim League" which was a political party set up for the sole purpose of protection of the rights of the Muslims of the Indian sub-continent.He also founded a girls’ high school in 1885, which was the first institution of its kind in India. He was instrumental in the formation of three industrial schools (helping revive declining industries) at the three principal centres of local industries, namely Aurangabad, Hyderabad and Warangal. The State Library was also started by him.

He received, for his services, the titles of Nawab Ali Yar Khan Bahadur, Motaman Jung, Imad-ud-Dowla and Imad-ul-Mulk and also the CSI from the Government of India for his services to the British Empire.

== Publications ==
- Life of Sir Salar Jung
- Lectures and Addresses
- Historical and Descriptive Sketch of His Highness the Nizam's Dominions, 2 vols.
- Verses
