= Chandu Lal =

Prime minister of Hyderabad State (1766 – 1845)

Maharaja Chandu Lal
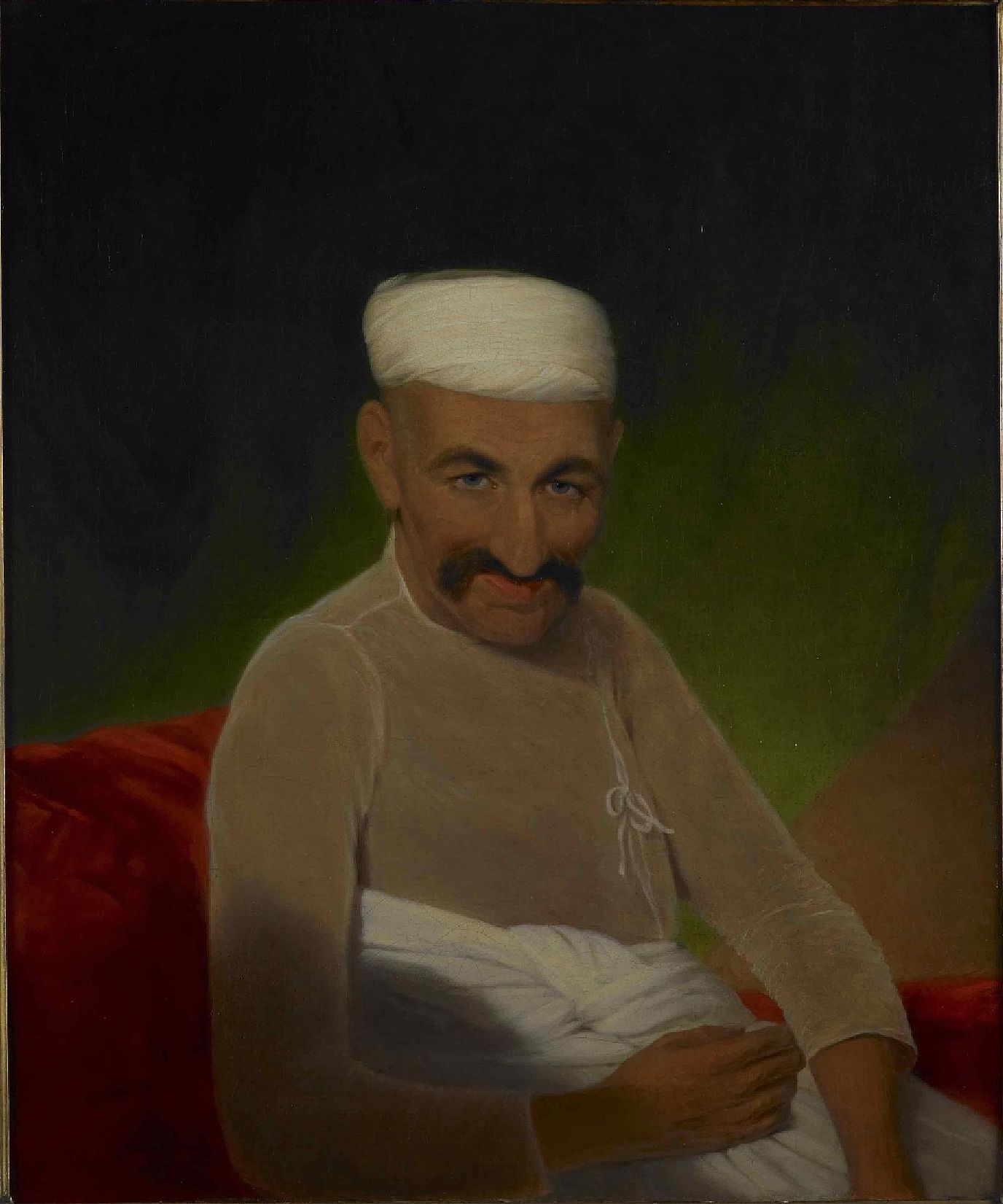
- Painting of Chandu Lal of Hyderabad State, by John Godwin Williams, ca.1836

Prime Minister of Hyderabad
- In office 1833–1844
- Monarch: Sikandar Jah

Personal details
- Died: 15 April 1845

Chandu Lal Malhotra (1766 – 15 April 1845), also known as Maharaja Chandu Lal, was the Prime Minister (1833–1844) for the third Nizam of Hyderabad, Sikandar Jah. He was born in Hyderabad Deccan (now Hyderabad, India), and hailed from a Hindu family of the Khatri caste with origins in Lahore, Punjab. He was also a poet of Urdu, Hyderabadi, Punjabi and Persian.

== Background ==
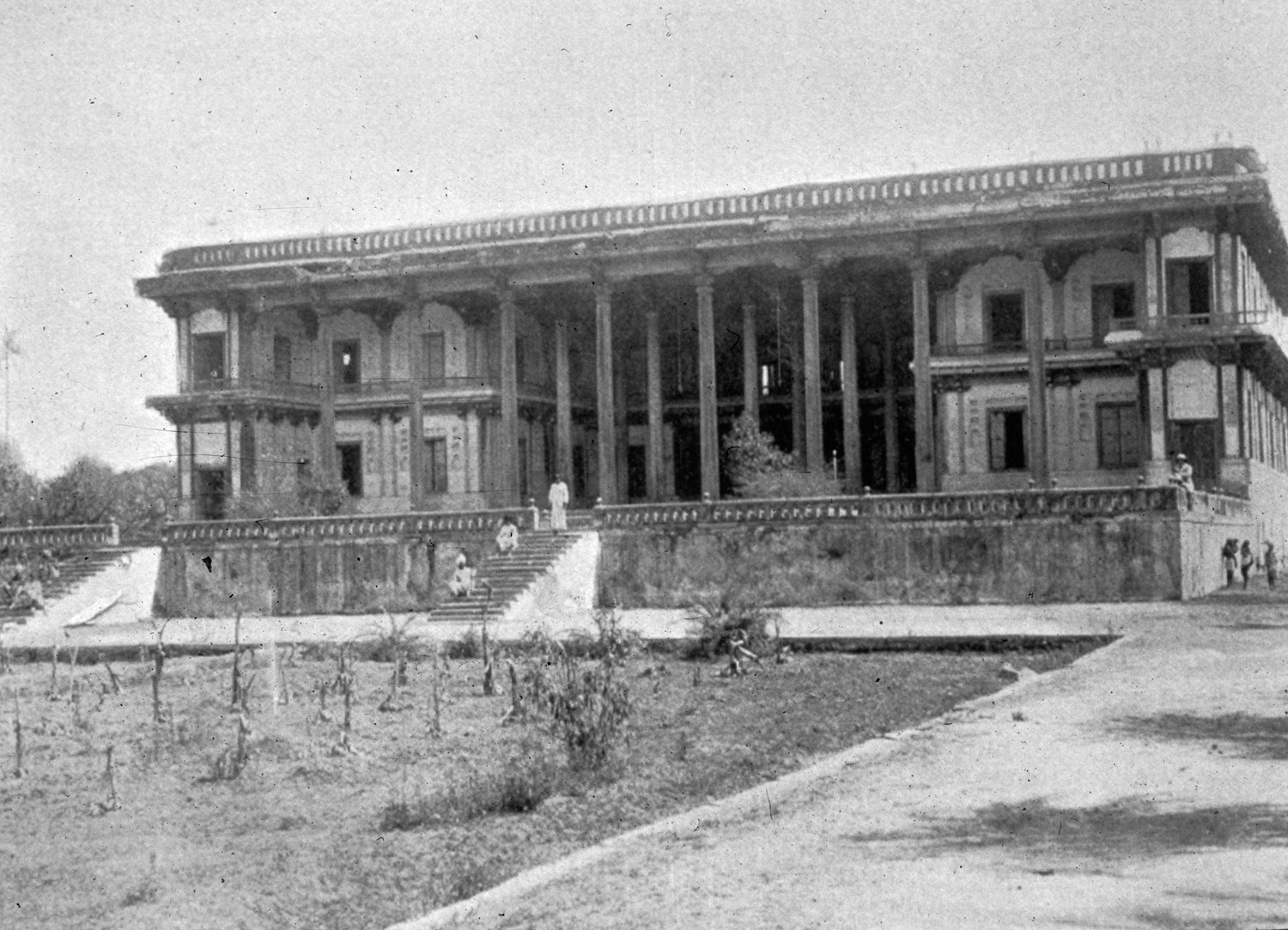
View of Baradari Chandulal in 1890s

Chandu Lal Sadan was born in a Hindu Malhotra family of Punjabi Khatri background. His family were Nanakpanthis. His father was Rai Naryen Das, who had migrated from Rai Bareilly to Hyderabad State, and his ancestors had served in the Mughal courts, including Todar Mal, the famed minister of Akbar.

His family was the founder of the Dafter-e-Mal (Department of Finance) in Hyderabad Deccan during Nizam-ul-Mulk, Asaf Jah I. The future prime minister, Maharaja Sir Kishen Pershad, was his great-grandson. The family was famously known as Malwala Family in Hyderabad. Chandu Lal may have considered himself a Nanakpanthi, as he was devotee of the Udasi saint, Baba Priyatam Das.

== Early career ==
He started his career as a subordinate in the customs department of Kingdom of Hyderabad. Later he received the title of Raja Bahadur from Nawab Sikandar Jah. Sikandar Jah selected him as accounts officer of his army. In 1819 Chandu Lal received the title of Maharaja from Sikandar Jah and a cash award of one crore rupees. In 1822 he was made the head of seven thousand horsemen with the title of Raja e Rajagan from Nawab Nasir-ud-Daulah. After the death of Monir-ul-Mulk in 1833, Chandu Lal succeeded him as a prime minister.

== Prime minister ==
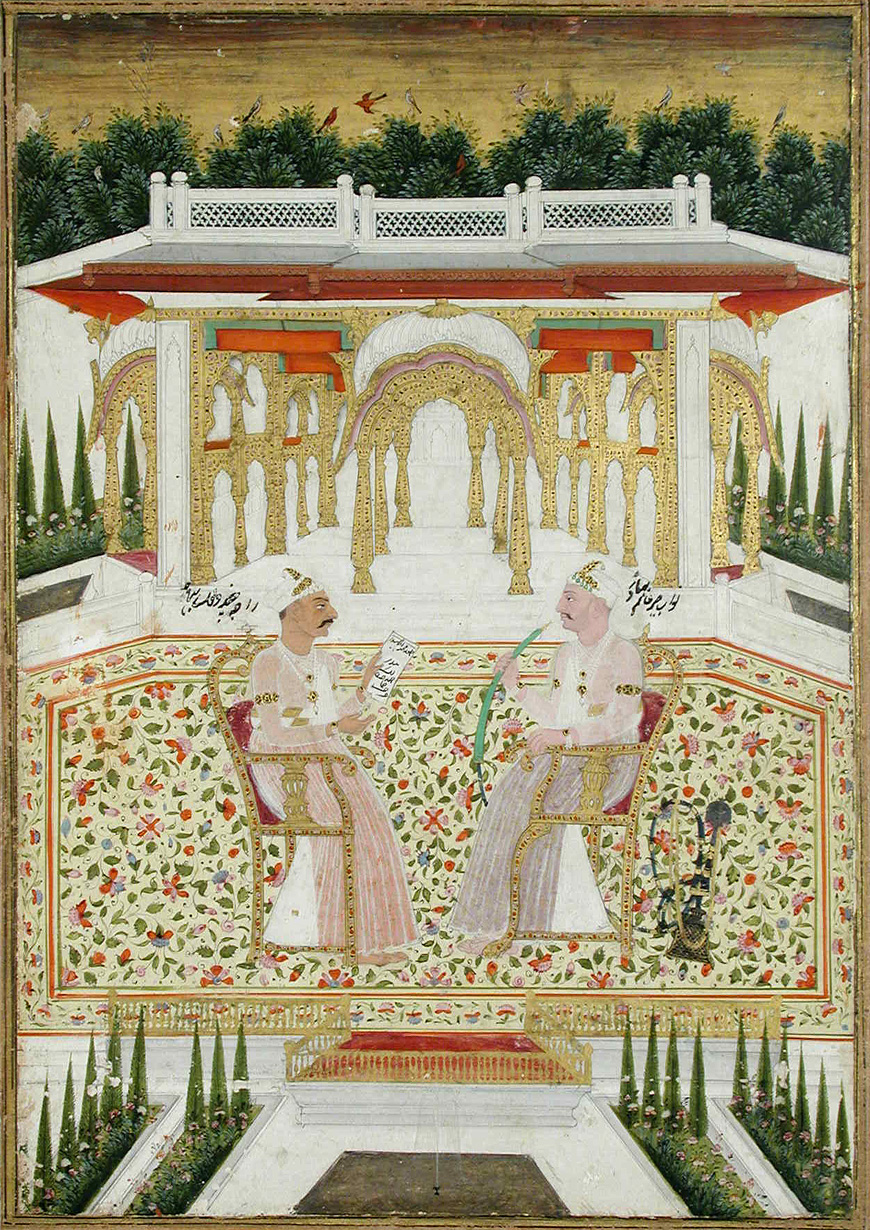
Nawab Mir 'Alam Bahadur and Raja Chandu Lal Bahadur, ca.1800

Chandu Lal was made prime minister of Hyderabad Deccan twice. First in the year 1808 then in 1832 AD and he held the office until 1843 AD.

== Maharaj Chandulal's Temple ==
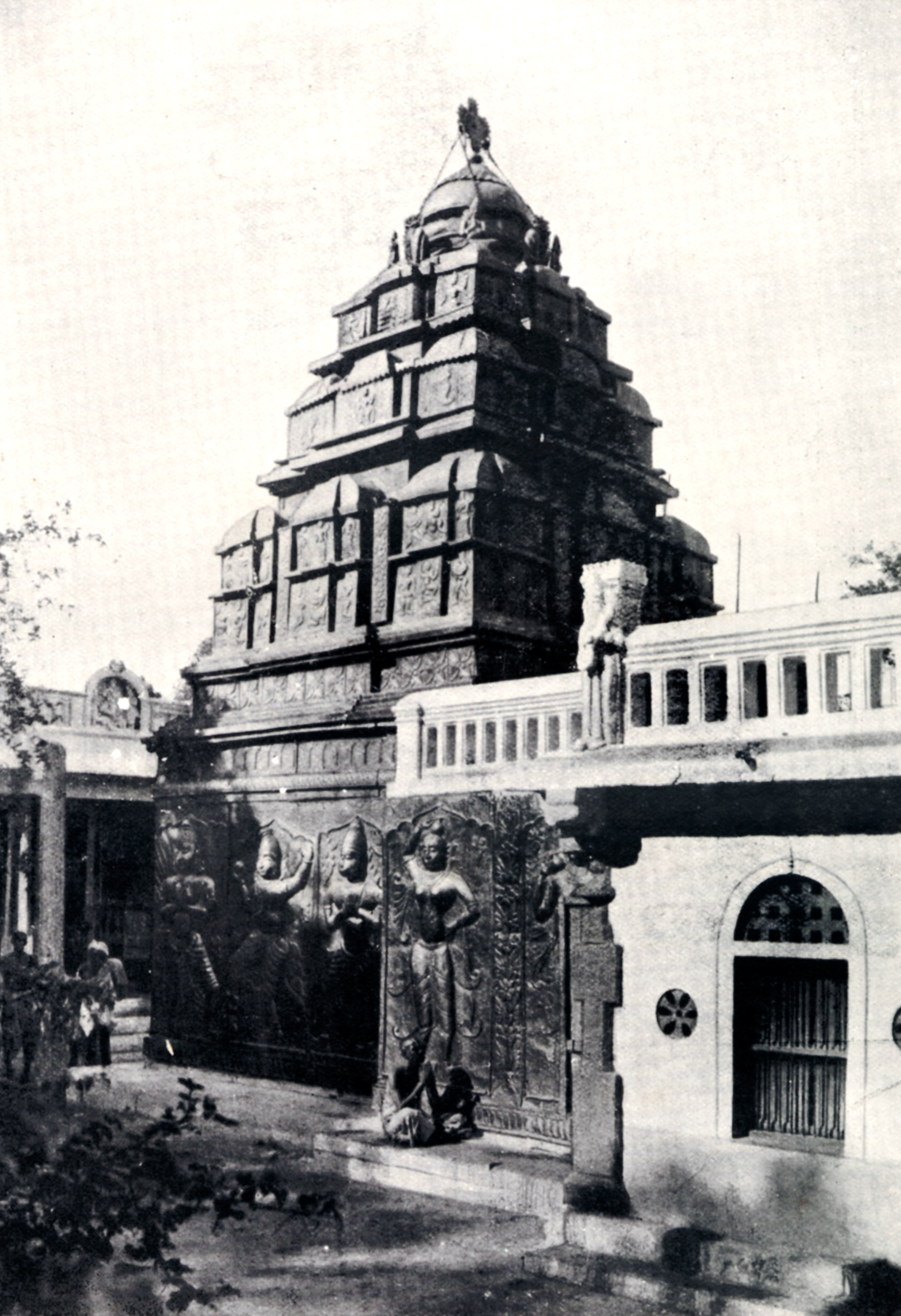
View of Maharaja Chandulal’s Temple as seen in 1929

As per legends, a saint returning from a pilgrimage to Tirumala stopped at Alwal. During his stay, the saint who was carrying an idol of Lord Balaji, sat meditating under a tamarind tree. Chandulal Bahadur, along with his family paid a visit to the saint to seek his blessings. The saint told Chandulal that Lord Venkateswara had appeared in his dreams and told him that a temple should be built at Alwal for devotees who could not afford to go to Tirumala. Chandulal built a small temple and installed the idol of Lord Venkateswara. The temple has been declared as an heritage structure.

== Poetry ==
Chandu Lal (who used the pen name "Shaadan" (شاداں) as a learned man, was a patron of Urdu poetry and literature. His patronage attracted Urdu poets to his court. He even invited poets from northern India like Zauq to Hyderabad State, although he refused, stating unwillingness to leave Delhi. Despite the responsibility of his prime ministerial office he used to regularly organize and attend Mushaira.

== See also ==
- Vitthal Sundar
- Prime Ministers of Hyderabad State

== Sources ==
- Qasemi, Sharif Husain (1990). "Čandū Laʿl Šādān". In Yarshater, Ehsan (ed.). Encyclopædia Iranica. Vol. IV/7: Calendars II–Cappadocia. London and New York: Routledge & Kegan Paul. pp. 756–757. ISBN 978-0-71009-130-7.
