= Syed Ali Bilgrami =

Indian scholar (1851–1911)

Shams-ul-Ulama Syed Ali Bilgrami FGS, FRAS
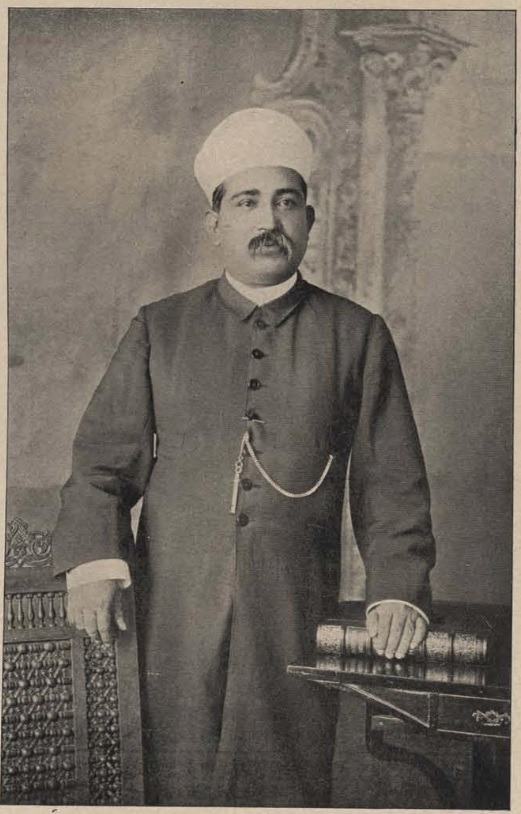
- Born: 1851
- Died: 1911 (aged 59–60); Hardoe
- Education: Patna College
- Relatives: Syed Hussain Bilgrami (brother); Zain Yar Jung (son-in-law); Sadath Ali Khan (grandson) (daughter Ruquia Lulu)

Shams-ul-Ulema Syed Ali Bilgrami (1851–1911) was an Indian scholar and linguist.

== Early life and education ==
Syed Ali was born in 1851, in a distinguished Sayyid family. His older brother was Syed Hussain.

During his childhood, he was educated in Arabic and Persian. After a period of study at the Canning College, he moved to the Patna College, from where he obtained a BA. He then joined the Thomson Civil Engineering College. Soon after, he visited Europe in 1876, in the suite of Salar Jung I. He joined the Royal School of Mines.

== Career ==
He entered the service of the Nizam of Hyderabad in 1879, and was appointed secretary in the Departments of Public Works, Railways and Mines. He served in Hyderabad State for many years until he retired from service in 1901.

In 1901, he settled in England. He was appointed a lecturer of Marathi at Cambridge University. For a short period of time, he also served as acting professor of Arabic and of Sanskrit.

In 1902, he was admitted to Lincoln's Inn, and called to the bar in 1906.

He returned to India due to ill health. In 1911, a Draft Constitution Committee was formed with the aim of converting the Muhammadan Anglo-Oriental College into a university, with Syed Ali as its secretary.

== Personal life ==
He was married. His daughter Ruqayya worked at Osmania University and married to Zain Yar Jung. His grandson, through Ruqayya was Sadath Ali Khan.

== Works ==
Syed Ali Bilgrami wrote in Urdu and English. His English works include Monographs on the Book of Kalila and Damna. Others include a translation of La Civilization des Arabes by Gustave Le Ron, as well as a translation of the Atharva Veda.
