= Omar Khalidi =

Indian-American Muslim scholar (1953–2010)

- Born: 1953; Hyderabad, India
- Died: 29 November 2010 (aged 56–57); Boston, USA
- Citizenship: Indian, USA

Academic background
- Education: Madrassa-e-Aaaliyah, Wichita State University; Harvard University; University of Wales Lampeter

Academic work
- Era: Modern era
- Main interests: Minority groups rights, military history
- Influenced: Sociology of politics, ethnic groups, nationalism

Omar Khalidi (1953 – 29 November 2010), born in Hyderabad, India, was a Muslim scholar, a staff member of MIT in the US, and an author.

== Early life and education ==
Khalidi was born in 1953 in Hyderabad, India. He was of Hadhrami descent.

== Career ==
He is referred to by one commentator as the "Chronicler of Hyderabad and as a champion of minority rights". He was considered an international relations builder.

== Scholar ==
His best known book is Hyderabad after the fall (book)|Hyderabad: After the Fall published in 1990.

=== Media contribution ===
Khalidi served as a regional Vice-President of American Federation of Muslims of Indian Origin, and was an active participant in the various activities of all other Indian Muslim organisations in the USA and Canada. His articles were published regularly in the MetroWest Daily News and he was an active columnist for various other journals, writing for the Economic and Political Weekly, The Outlook, India Abroad, Two Circles and other print and internet media.

=== Books ===
His books include:

Published Year	Book Name	Publisher
1981	The British Residents at the Court of the Nizams of Hyderabad	Hyderabad Historical Society.
1985	Hyderabad State Under the Nizams, 1724–1948: A Bibliography of Monographic and Periodical Literature	Hyderabad Historical Society.
1987	Deccan Under the Sultans, 1296–1724: A Bibliography of Monographic and Periodical Literature	Hyderabad Historical Society.
1988	African Diaspora in India: The Case of the Habashis of Deccan	Hamdard National Foundation.
1988	Hyderabad After the Fall	Hyderabad Historical Society.
1990	Indian Muslims in North America	South Asia Press.
1991	Factors in Muslim Electability to Lok Sabha	Harvard University Press.
1991	Memoirs of Cyril Jones: People, Society, and Railways in Hyderabad	Manohar Publications.
1992	Shama-e-Faroozan: Chand Ilmi Aur Adabi Shakhsiyatoon Ke Halaat-e-Zindagi Aur Karname	Azmi and Sons.
1994	Memoirs of Sidney Cotton	South Asia Press.
1995	Islamic Literature in the Deccani Languages: Kannada, Marathi, & Telugu	Hyderabad Historical Society.
1997	Hadhrami Role in the Politics and Society of Colonial India, 1750–1950	in Freitag and Clearance-Smith: Hadhrami Scholar, Traders and Statesmen of the Indian Ocean, 1750–1960. Brill Publisher, the Netherlands.
1998	Subsequent-e-Hyderabad: Chashm Deed Aur Muasir Tahreeron Par Mushtamil Manzar Aur Pesh Manzar (Edited with Dr. Muinuddin Aqil)	All India Majlis Tameer-e-Millat.
1999	Romance of the Golconda Diamonds	Mapin Publishing.
1999	Approaches to Mosque Design in North America	MIT.
1999	The Architecture and Campus Planning of Osmania University	MIT.
1999	American Architecture of Islamic Inspiration	MIT.
2003	A Guide to Arabic, Persian, Turkish, and Urdu Manuscript Libraries in India	Middle East Librarians Association.
2003	Khaki and Ethnic Violence in India: Army, Police, and Paramilitary Forces During Communal Riots	Three Essays Press.
2004	Between Muslim Nationalists and Nationalist Muslims: Maududi’s Thoughts on Indian Muslims	Institute of Objective Studies.
2004	The British Residency in Hyderabad: An Outpost of the Raj (1779–1948)	British Association for Cemeteries in South Asia.
2006	An Indian Passage to Europe: The Travels of Fath Nawaz Jang	Oxford University Press.
2006	Muslims in the Deccan: A Historical Survey	Global Media Publications.
2006	Muslims in Indian Economy	Three Essays Collective.
2006	Khaki and Ethnic Violence in India-2	Three Essays Collective.
2006	A Guide to Architecture in Hyderabad, Deccan, India	Three Essays Collective.

== Death ==
Khalidi died on 29 November 2010, in a train accident at Kendall Square, MBTA station in Cambridge, Massachusetts. His family published a statement in the Arab News on 30 November 2010: Khalidi drove in his car to the MIT campus and was probably trying to catch a train to buy medicine at the next station. He was diabetic, and it seems his sugar level had reached abnormal levels and he was hit by a train in Boston, United States His funeral prayers were held at the Islamic Society of Boston Cultural Center in Roxbury.

He was survived by his wife Nigar Khalidi and his daughter Aliya.

== See also ==
- Hyderabadi Muslims
- Golkonda
- Hyderabad State
- India
- Muslim culture of Hyderabad
- History of Hyderabad for a history of the city of Hyderabad.
- Hyderabad (India) for the city.
- Muhammad Hamidullah
