= Mir Taher Ali Khan =

Indian linguistic scholar

Sahebzada Nawab Mir Taher Ali Khan (1904 – 1981), also known by his pen name "Muslim", was a distinguished linguistic scholar and professor in European languages from the city of Hyderabad in India. A member of the Hyderabad nobility, he was also an advisor to the eldest son of the last Nizam of Hyderabad (Prince Azam Jah) and worked at Bella Vista Palace. He was proficient in English, French, German, Russian, Spanish, Italian, Arabic, Turkish and Persian apart from Urdu which was his mother tongue. In fact, he got a doctorate in philology from Germany. Anybody who studied any of these languages in the sixties and seventies should have come into contact with this polyglotte. He was a connoisseur of ghazals, and a poet in Urdu and Persian, and would regularly attend the mushairas conducted in the old city of Hyderabad.
