= Masood Ali Khan =

Masood Ali Khan, also known as M.A. Khan, (born 15 March 1947]) is an Indian scholar, historian and a writer on Islamic history, culture, and religion. He is currently working as acting director of the Indian Council of Social Science Research, Southern Regional Centre, Osmania University, Hyderabad, India. He writes on social problems of Indian Muslims, Indian diaspora, sociology of migration, and Urdu press and journalism. He was born to a Hyderabadi Muslim family.

== Books ==
Khan has written books and articles in research journals, has supervised and reviewed half a dozen books and contributed about 100 articles in Urdu on social problems of Indian Muslims. He has presented research papers in the United States, UK, Canada, France, Turkey and Malaysia. He served as a consultant to research projects commissioned by the Indian Council of Social Science Research and the Indian Council of Historical Research. Some of his books include:

- Encyclopedia of world geography
- Cultural Sociology of India
- Encyclopaedia of Islam
- Encyclopaedia of Sufism (12 volume set)
- International encyclopaedia of librarianship
- The expansion of Islam
- The Islamic Fundamentalism
- Minorities in India
- The Quranic studies
- Mystics and mysticism in Islam
- Islam in modern India
- Social work and social policy (concepts and methods)
- Religious doctrine of Islam
- Islam in the Arabic world
- Islam (birth and origin)
- Islam (rise and growth)
- Life and times of Prophet Muhammad
- Women in Islam
- Islamic laws
- Islam in the modern world
- Traditions in Islam
- History and sociology in India
- The methods of social research
- Women and human rights
- Perspectives on Indo-Pak relations

== See also ==
- Hyderabadi Muslims
- Muhammad Hamidullah
