= Sahib Husayni =

Indian Sufi saint of the Qadiri order (1805–1880)

Sayyid Sāhib Ḥusayni
- Portrait of Sayyid Sāhib Ḥusayni
- Title: Qādiri ,

Personal life
- Born: 1805 CE (1219 AH) in Tekmal
- Died: 9 January 1880 CE (26 Muharram 1297 AH) in Tekmal
- Era: Islamic golden age
- Main interest: Sufism
- Occupation: Sufi and Muslim Scholar

Religious life
- Religion: Islam
- Jurisprudence: Sunni Sufi
- Creed: Qadiriyyah

Muslim leader
- Influenced by: Shah Muhammad Maroof Shahidullah Farooqui Chisti Qadiri

Sayyid Sāhib Ḥusayni (1805–9 January 1880) was a famous Sufi saint from Hyderabad State, India and had a great influence over spiritual developments in the Deccan area. He belonged to Qadiri Order, and was a great proponent of the concept of Wahdat al-Shuhood.

Sahib Ḥusayni was a murid (disciple) of the noted Sufi saint of Hyderabad, Shah Muhammad Maroof Shahidullah Farooqui Chisti Qadiri, who also belonged to the Qadiri Order.

== Biography ==
As per the family tree preserved in the family records, Sayyid Sahib Ḥusayni was a direct descendant of Muhammad through his daughter Fatimah and Ali ibn Abi Talib. The thirteenth in line from their descent was the famous Sufi Shaikh Abdul Qadir Gilani, who founded the Qadiri Order and Sayyid Sahib Ḥusayni is his direct descendant. Sayyid Sahib Ḥusayni belongs to the forty-first generation after Fatimah.

He was born Sayyid Sahib Ḥusayni in Tekmal in 1805. His father was Sayyid Abdur Razzaq who was also initiated into the Qadiri Order. This was during the period of the Nizam Mir Akbar Ali Khan Sikander Jah, Asaf Jah III of Hyderabad State.

Sahib Ḥusayni moved to Hyderabad city at the age of 14 to pursue his higher education and remained there for five years despite financial pressures. He was determined to acquire the knowledge of religious and worldly sciences. In 1824, he was forced to return to Tekmal due to illness and death of his father. That is when he realised that he had not been able to acquire the knowledge of spiritual awareness from his father who was very advanced in these matters.

Sayyid Sahib Ḥusayni lamented this for a long time. Eventually he claims to have had dreams in 1825 which his father appeared and advised him to become the disciple of Shah Muhammad Maroof Shahidullah Farooqui Chisti Qadiri, who was a famous Sufi of his times in Hyderabad. Therefore, he sought out this great Sufi, and became his disciple the following year in 1826. The same year, Shah Muhammad Maroof Shahidullah Farooqui Chisti Qadiri appointed Sayyid Sahib Ḥusayni as his "khalifa" (successor). Having acquired this status, Sahib Husayni returned home to Tekmal.

During the upcoming years, Shah Muhammad Maroof Shahidullah Farooqui Chisti Qadiri visited his khalifah Sayyid Sahib Ḥusayni a number of times in Tekmal. During one such visit in 1831, he also granted the title of "sajjadah" to Sayyid Sahib Ḥusayni

In 1833, Shah Muhammad Maroof Shahidullah Farooqui Chisti Qadiri visited Tekmal again, and proclaimed that he would die in that town, and be buried there. A place for his grave was determined. He came again the following year in 1834 and expired and is buried in Tekmal according to his will. His death occurred on 2 Sha'aban 1249 Hijri. Twenty one years later in 1854, Sayyid Sahib Ḥusayni had a mausoleum constructed over the tomb of his master.

Sayyid Sahib Ḥusayni died in Tekmal in the year 1880 and his buried there. He left behind 5 sons and one daughter as follows:

- Sayyid Ahmad Badshah Qadiri (who became his successor), 1833–1907
- Sayyid Maroof Badshah Qadiri, died 1910
- Sayyid Yasin Badshah Qadiri, died 1914
- Sayyid Muhyi-uddin Badshah Qadiri
- Sayyid Abdul Qadir Badshah Qadiri
- Sahibni Bi (daughter) who was married to Khwaja Husayni

== Development activities ==
Sayyid Sahib Husayni is remembered for the number of development works he initiated in and around Tekmal. Among the projects he undertook, the following ones are of key importance:

- Establishment of Madrasah-e-Husayniya in 1827. This complex was funded out of his own money, and has continued to be the most important institution to impart education in Tekmal. This institution was considered to be one of the prime educational institutions in the State of Hyderabad, and its graduates were in great demand.
- Establishment of the Tekmal Mosque in 1827. It is one of the largest mosques in the district.
- Digging of sweet water wells in different parts of Tekmal region for the benefit of the common people.

== His works ==
Sayyid Sahib Ḥusayni wrote a number of books on aspects of Sufism.

His other famous works are the following books in Persian and Urdu languages:

- Masnawi Shahid-ul-Askar – This book is a commentary on book Khatimah written by Khwaja Banda Nawaz Gesudaraz
- Shawahid-i Husayni – This book covers a number of subjects. It has chapters on the Islamic creed, Islamic jurisprudence, issues of Sufism, guidance on the Sufi path, worship, day-to-day affairs, and methods of entering into the remembrance of Allah.
- Shahid-ul-Wujud – This book was originally written in Persian and translated into Urdu by Prof. Syed Ataullah Husayni Karachi, 1986. It covers aspects of Sufi thought.
- Nukat-i Shahid – This book covers answers to questions raised by his disciples among other subjects.
- Maktub-i Husayni – This is a compilation of his letters.
- Farhang-i Husayni – This is a primer on Persian grammar and language, and it has been used for decades in many parts of Hyderabad State for the teaching of Persian language. This was the first book he wrote. It was written during the years 1827 and 1831.

== Ancestry ==
Sayyid Sahib Ḥusayni is a direct descendant of Muhammad. His ancestors moved to India and eventually to Tekmal.

Mausoleum of his Sufi master Shah Muhammad Maroof Shahidullah Qadiri at Tekmal.

== See also ==
- Sufi Saints of South Asia

== Bibliography ==
- Kazi Zulkader Siddiqui, Genealogy of Hyderabadi Families, 2020
- Syed Ahmed Quadri, History of Takemal Dargah, Hyderabad, 1977
- Syed Shah Azam Ali Soofi Quadri, Muqaddas Tekmal, Hyderabad, 1985
- Syed Ahmed Quadri, Shajar-i Ghawsiya Tekmal mein, Hyderabad, 1977
- Syed Ahmed Quadri, A New Lease of Life to Tekmal, Hyderabad, 1982
- Syed Ahmed Quadri, Karamat o Halat, Hyderabad, 1978
- Syed Maroof Badshah Quadri,Malfuz-e-Husayni, Hyderabad, c. 1890
- Syed Maroof Badshah Quadri,Karamat-e-Husayni, Hyderabad, c. 1895
- Syed Maroof Badshah Quadri,Asrar-e-Husayni, Hyderabad, c. 1898
- Syed Ghulam Jilani Quadri (of Medak), Tadhkirah-e-Husayni, Hyderabad, c. 1890
- Shah, Husayn Ali, Karamat-e-Husayni, Hyderabad, c. 1900
