= Sayed Mehboob Shah Qadri =

Indian social reformer

Sayed Mehboob Shah Qadri, popularly known as Sayedbhai, is an Indian social reformer from Pune. He was awarded the Padma Shri, the fourth highest civilian award of India, for his work in social services in 2020.

== Biography ==
At the age of four, Qadri's family moved to Pune from his native city Hyderabad. He had a brother and four sisters. He started working when he was 13. When he was 20, the divorce of her sister prompted him to work for divorced women. He met social reformer Hamid Dalwai and co-founded Muslim Satyashodhak Mandal, an organisation promoting social reforms in Muslims, on 22 March 1970. The organisation rehabilitates Muslim women divorced by their husbands through triple talaq, an Islamic form of divorce. It provides financial support, legal assistance and vocational training to divorced women. It has rehabilitated more than ten thousand women over the fifty years. It also awards Hamid Dalwai Smruti Puraskar to a social worker every year.

== Recognition ==
Qadri was awarded the Padma Shri, the fourth highest civilian award of India, for his work in social services in 2020.
