= Mir Mohtesham Ali Khan =

Indian bodybuilder

- Professional bodybuilder

Personal info
- Born: Hyderabad, Andhra Pradesh (now in Telangana), India

Best statistics
- Height: 6 ft 2 in (1.88 m)
- Weight: Contest: 200 lb (91 kg) Off season: 215 lb (98 kg)

Professional (Pro) career
- Best win: Mr. World 2007 (Silver Medal); 2007–10

Mir Mohtesham Ali Khan is a professional bodybuilder. He earned multiple national and international titles. The highest title he won was Silver medal in Mr. World Body Building Championship, in the heavyweight category (90+ kg).

== Early life ==
He was born in Hyderabad, India. He is the son of Mir Abul Mani Khan and Afsar Begum, Mohtesham studied at Aliya High School and Shadan College before completing his engineering degree in the Indo-British Academy.

He was recruited into the South Central Railway under the sports quota. Mohtesham was recently appointed the youngest coach by the Indian Body Builders Federation (IBBF) and won four medals in different categories at the Las Vegas 2010 Musclemania contest.

== Bodybuilding career ==
Mohtesham began bodybuilding in 1994, at age 14.

He won the Silver medal at the Musclemania World Tour competition 2008. Initially, Mohtesham got a Bronze in the Musclemania championship, of USA. He was awarded the Silver medal following a dope test in which his Chinese counterpart tested positive. Titles include:

- Mr. World (Silver Medalist) 2008
- Indian Body Building Captain (2008 and 2009)
- Mr.Universe VIth place
- Mr. India (2 Times)
- Mr.South India (3 Times)
- Mr.South Central Railway (8 Times)
- Mr. Andhra Pradesh (9 Times)
- Mr. Hyderabad (11 Times)

He was also the captain of the 14-member Indian team that participated in the Musclemania championship 2010. Mohtesham is the first body builder from Telangana to be selected as captain.

== Training ==
=== Diet ===
Mohtesham's daily diet includes 30 egg whites, 1 kg chicken breasts, 12 oranges, 200gm green salad, 1 cup of sweet corn, 150 gm oatmeal and 2 to 4 chapatis.

=== Daily Exercise ===
The daily routine event is split into two sessions. The morning (5-10) session is for smaller muscles like biceps, triceps, neck, calf and abdomen while the evening (5 hr) session is for chest, shoulder, thigh and back.

=== Vital statistics ===
- Height 6' 2"
- Weight 98 kg
