= Sulaiman Areeb =

Indian poet

Sulaiman Areeb (5 April 1922 - 7 September 1972) was an Indian poet from Aurangabad.

== Life ==
Areeb was of Hadhrami Arab Muslim ancestry. His forebears migrated from the Hadramaut to the city of Hyderabad to work under the Nizam of Hyderabad. His father Sulaiman bin Abd al-Razzaq was a commissioned officer in the Hyderabad State Forces. He was married twice, the second time to Safia Begum, who herself was an Urdu teacher and writer.

He started his literary career at an early age. Initially, he wrote essays and short stories but later turned to poetry. He became known after the independence of India.

He was editor and publisher of Saba (The Breeze), an Urdu literary magazine established in 1955. It played an important role in popularizing modern literary trends and concepts.

Areeb was an active member of the Communist Party of India (CPI) and champion of the Progressive Writers Movement. He strongly supported the Telangana Peasants' Revolt along with other progressive Urdu writers of Hyderabad in order to give equality and civil rights to the native Hindu population and end the discrimination and oppression perpetrated by the Muslims.

His poems have been translated into other languages, including English.

== Work and contribution ==
- Pas-e-Gareban (Publication Hyderabad Anjuman Taraqqi Urdu 1961)
- Hyderabad Ke Sha'ir Vol II
