= Syed Abdul Latif (writer) =

Indian writer

- Born: Hyderabad, Telangana, India
- Occupations: Writer, scholar
- Known for: writings on Islamic culture and Urdu literature
- Awards: Padma Bhushan (1970)

Syed Abdul Latif was an Indian writer of English literature. He was the president of Institute of Indo-.Middle East Cultural Studies and Academy of Islamic Studies, Hyderabad and was the author of a number of books on Islamic culture and Urdu literature, among other topics.

== Work ==
His works included The Mind Al-Qurʼan Builds, Basic Concepts of the Quran, The Opening Chapter of the Quran, and An Outline of the Cultural History of India. The Government of India awarded him Padma Bhushan, the third highest Indian civilian award, in 1970. A trust in his honor, Dr. Syed Abdul Latif's Trust for Quranic and other Cultural Studies, has published several books on Islamic culture.

== See also ==
- Mirza Ghalib
