= Sadikshah Qadri =

Personal life
- Born: 10 June 1918
- Died: 3 September 1978 (aged 60)
- Resting place: Samadhi in Pashan

Religious life
- Religion: Islam, Hinduism
- Philosophy: Bhakti Yoga, Sufism, Jnana Yoga, Karma Yoga

Sadikshah Qadri (10 June 1918 – 3 September 1978) was an Indian Sufi saint and yogi of Pashan, a suburb located 15 kilometres from the city of Pune.
