= Kazi Zainul Abedin =

- Kazi Zainul Abedin in 1936 as 1st Taluqdar of Nizamabad
- Born: 8 December 1892; Parbhani, Hyderabad Deccan
- Died: May 1962 (aged 69); Mirpurkhas, Pakistan
- Other name: Abid (pen name for poetry)
- Citizenship: Pakistani
- Occupations: Poet, government servant
- Known for: Poetry, literature
- Spouses: Sahibni Begum; Zohra Begum
- Relatives: Sayyid Sahib Husayni, Kazi Zulkader Siddiqui, Kazi Uzair

Kazi Mohammed Zainul Abedin (Urdu: قاضى ﻣﺤﻤﺪ ﺯﻳﻦ ﺍﻟﻌﺎﺑﺪﻳﻦ) (8 December 1892 – 23 May 1962) was an Urdu poet and an officer in the Government of the Nizam of Hyderabad. He was also the last Kazi of Udgir under the Hyderabad State.

== Ancestry ==
Kazi Zainul Abedin was born in Parbhani on 8 December 1892. He was the only son of Kazi Mohammed Badruddin Hussain and Rahimunnisa Begam.

His lineage traces back to the first Rashidun Caliph Abu Bakr. He was also a direct descendant of the Sufi Baha-ud-din Zakariya Multani (1160–1267). One of the great-grandsons of Baha-ud-din Zakariya Multani, i.e. Shaykh Nizamuddin, moved to the Deccan in South India during the reign of Sultan Muhammad bin Tughluq around the year 1343. Subsequently, this branch of the family settled down in Hyderabad for over six centuries.

Kazi Zainul Abedin's ancestors were given the title of "Kazi", i.e. judge and administrators of the various towns that were located west of the city of Hyderabad – like Qandahar, Udgir, Parbhani, etc. He was the last of the series of Kazis of Udgir in District Bidar, Hyderabad State.

== Education ==
Kazi Zainul Abedin acquired his basic education in Arabic, Persian and English, following the Dars-i-Nizami. He was the first person in the entire family to have ever learnt the English language, which was considered a great asset in India which was then governed by the British. During his time, there was a general opposition against learning the English language in the literary circles of the Muslims of Hyderabad. He countered this opposition to acquire knowledge of the Western sciences.

He then completed his Matriculation from University of Bombay during 1910–1912. It is reported that he used to be ill most of the time during this period. Therefore, he reverted to Hyderabad and gained admission at the Nizam College, from where he completed his Intermediate in 1915.

== Career in the Government of Hyderabad ==
Upon graduation from Nizam College in 1915, he sat for the Hyderabad Civil Service (H.C.S.) examination, and came first in the competition. He entered the HCS in 1916.

He is one of the earliest officers of the coveted Hyderabad Civil Service and eventually rose up to the rank of a Secretary (or Nazim) in the government of the Nizam of Hyderabad State. His eldest son Kazi Abdur Rasheed also followed in his footsteps and joined the Hyderabad Civil Service in 1946, two years before the fall of Hyderabad State to Indian armed forces.

After entering the civil service, his first posting was for revenue training in Akola and Amravati. In subsequent years, he passed the departmental examination of Central Provinces and Berar, and stood first in Berar in the Revenue Higher Examination. He then passed the Judicial Higher examination with credit, and the Accounts Higher and Survey Higher exams as well. Amongst the vernacular languages, he gained proficiency in Marathi, and passed the Marathi Written Test as well.

During his professional career, he held the following positions:

- Additional Madadgar-e-Mal at Aurangabad (1327F)
- 3rd Taluqdar at Beed
- Assistant Settlement Superintendent at Warangal
- Famine Camp Officer at Ambad and Aurangabad
- Ballarpur Kazipet Railway construction
- Assistant Settlement Superintendent at Warangal
- 3rd Taluqdar at Udgir and Jalna in 1921
- Munsif and Magistrate at Andole (Medak), and Qandhar (Nanded)
- Officiating Additional District Judge at Nanded
- Assistant Subedar at Aurangabad in 1929–30
- Special Officer at Nizamsagar and Borlum, Nizamabad
- Officiating Special 1st Taluqdar, Nizamsagar District
- 2nd Taluqdar at Nizamabad
- Officiating 1st Taluqdar at Beed
- Assistant Revenue Secretary at Hyderabad
- 1st Taluqdar at Asifabad
- Special Officer, Forest Department
- Officiating Deputy Revenue Secretary at Hyderabad
- Special Duty at Revenue Secretariat, Hyderabad, 1935
- 1st Taluqdar at Nizamabad, 1939
- Nazim-e-Abkari, Revenue Department.

== Kazi of Udgir ==
Kazi Zainul Abedin was the last of the officiating Kazis of Udgir under the Hyderabad State. It was a culmination of centuries of family tradition. His ancestors had held this position for nearly 600 years. With the loss of Hyderabad State to Indian forces in 1948, he had to abandon his position along with his vast land holdings and move to Pakistan.

== Migration to Pakistan ==
The fall of Hyderabad State to the invading Indian forces in 1948 had a devastating impact on most of the noble families of Hyderabad. Many of them migrated to Pakistan, Gulf States, or Europe. Abedin also decided to make his move to seek safety for his family. He moved first to Bombay and then took a passenger ship to the port city of Karachi at the end of 1948.

Thus, a year after the creation of Pakistan, Abedin moved to Pakistan and settled down in Mirpurkhas, Sindh in 1948. He had lost all of his vast estate in Hyderabad and Udgir along with most of his belongings. He had to start his life afresh in his old age, after having led a very successful life. The government of Pakistan partly compensated him out of the evacuee properties left behind by those Hindus who had migrated to India. He was given nearly 1,000 acres (4.0 km^{2}) of land in Mirpurkhas along with a flour mill and a printing press.

For the next several years, he struggled to establish himself. He spent the rest of his years at Mirpurkhas in developing agricultural farms and social work in that area. Most of the area of the province of Sindh was backward. The British had not paid enough attention towards the development of these towns and villages. It was an uphill task to work towards development projects and help in alleviating poverty in the region.

Abedin died on 23 May 1962 and was buried on his farms in Mirpurkhas.

== Family ==
Kazi Zainul Abedin was married first to Sahibni Begum (popularly known as Pasha Begum) in the year 1919. She was the great granddaughter of the famous Sufi of Tekmal Sayyid Sahib Husayni. They had two sons (Kazi Abdur Rasheed and Kazi Abdul Qayum), and four daughters (Razia Begum, Aliya Begum, Humaira Begum, and Abida Begum). His wife Sahibni Begum died at a young age in 1927, after birth of Abida Begum.

Since his children were young, Kazi Zainul Abedin decided to get married again. He married Zohra Begum, who was the daughter of Kazi Ahmed Muneeruddin, the Kazi of Parbhani, and a niece of his first wife. They had one daughter (Zakiya Begum), and three sons (Kazi Saeeduddin Masood, Kazi Badruddin Sayeed, and Kazi Mazharuddin Tariq).

His grandsons include Kazi Vicaruddin, Kazi Taqiuddin Adil, Kazi Zulkader Siddiqui, Kazi Abdul Muktadir and Kazi Uzair.

== Poetry ==
Kazi Zainul Abedin was a poet in his own right, and has published his collection of poems (diwan) as well. He used to write under the pen-name (takhallus) of Abid.

Many of his poems and short couplets are engraved on buildings, monuments and projects in Hyderabad State that he inaugurated or established. Often, his couplets would depict the year of establishment of that particular building or monument through literary forms. He was famous for using the Arabic letters that had a numerical value to determine an actual date through names and poetic couplets.

He named his children and grandchildren in a manner that the same Arabic letters within the name would add up to the year of birth.

== Publications ==
Kazi Zainul Abedin has authored a number of articles and books on poetry, literature, history, religion, and ethics.

Some of his books that have been published are as follows:

- "On Splendour of Ajanta Caves".
- "Diwan-e-Abid” – collection of his poetry

== See also ==
- List of Pakistanis
- Sayyid Sahib Husayni

== Footnotes ==
=== Works cited ===
- Siddiqui, Akbar, Mashaheer-e-Qandahar, Hyderabad, 1936
- Siddiqui, Kazi Zulkader, Genealogy of Hyderabadi Families, KZS Books, 2020
- Hyderabad Civil Service Association Souvenir, issued to its members on the occasion of the Silver Jubilee of HEH The Nizam VII’s reign of Hyderabad, 1935
