= Tekmal =

- Location in Telangana, India Tekmal (India)
- Coordinates: 17.97°N 78.04°E
- Country: India
- State: Telangana
- District: Medak
- Elevation: 455 m (1,493 ft)

Population (2008)
  - Total: 39,164

Languages
  - Official: Telugu, Urdu
- Time zone: UTC+5:30 (IST)
- Postal code: 502302
- Vehicle registration: TG 35
- Website: telangana.gov.in

Tekmal is a village, and Mandal in Medak District in Telangana, India. It is 140 km to the north of Hyderabad.

== Geography ==
Tekmal is located near Jogipet at 17.97°N 78.04°E. It has an average elevation of 455 metres (1496 feet).
