= Sayyid Ahmedullah Qadri =

Indian politician

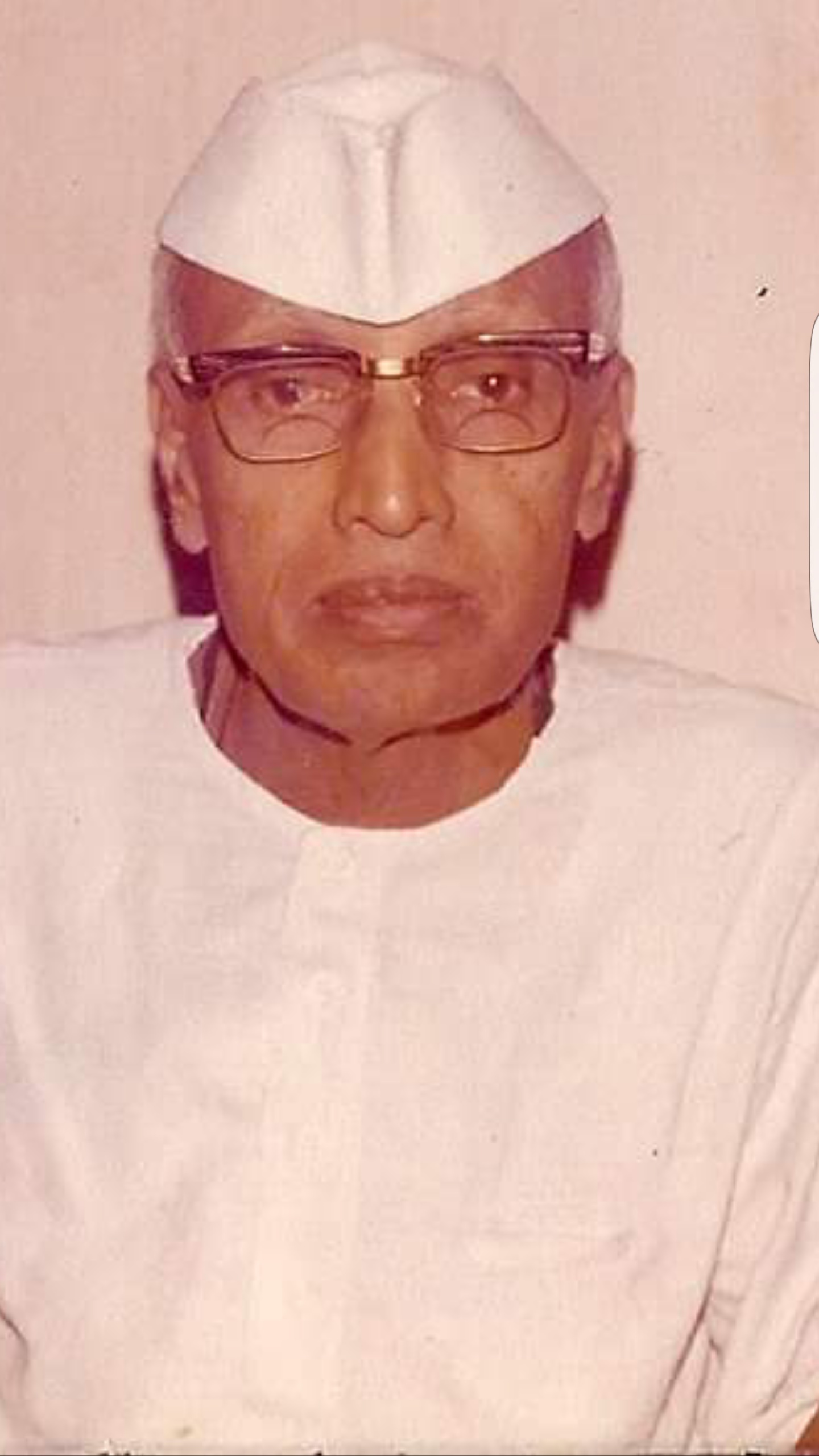
- Born: 9 August 1909; Hyderabad, Hyderabad State, British India
- Died: 5 October 1985 (aged 76); Hyderabad, Andhra Pradesh, India
- Occupations: Poet, journalist, writer, translator, literary citic, educationist and politician
- Known for: One nation theory, United India
- Notable work: Tanqid-i-Qamus-ul-Mashahir
- Political party: Indian National Congress
- Spouse: Sayyida Shahzadi Begum
- Parent: Sayyid Shamsullah Qadri (Father)
- Awards: Padma Shri in 1966

Sayyid Ahmedullah Qadri (9 August 1909 – 5 October 1985), known as Lisan-ul-Mulk, was a writer, author, critic, editor-in-chief, Indian independence activist, Indian politician and an acclaimed figure of Hyderabad, India. He was president of Lutfuddaulah Oriental Research Institute Hyderabad, president of Hyderabad Journalist Association, member of State Library Council.

Qadri was awarded civilian award Padma Shri in 1966 by the government of India for his work in literature and education. He was also a member of Andhra Pradesh State Legislative Council and chairman of Andhra Pradesh state Hajj Committee. Further he was founder and editor-in-chief of the Urdu daily newspaper Saltanat and Paisa Akhbar; prior to that he was editor in Tarikh Publications, which was founded by his father since 1929.

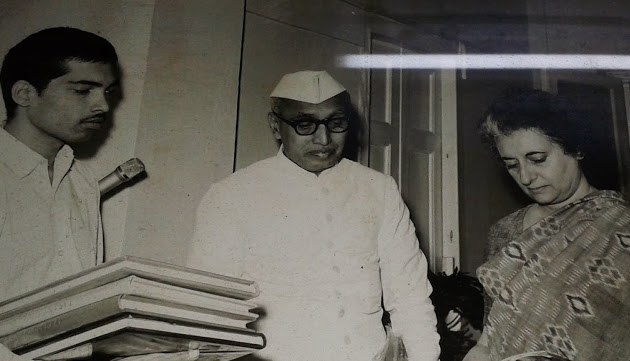
Padamshri Sayyid AhmedUllah Qadri (M.L.C) With then Prime Minister Indira Gandhi.

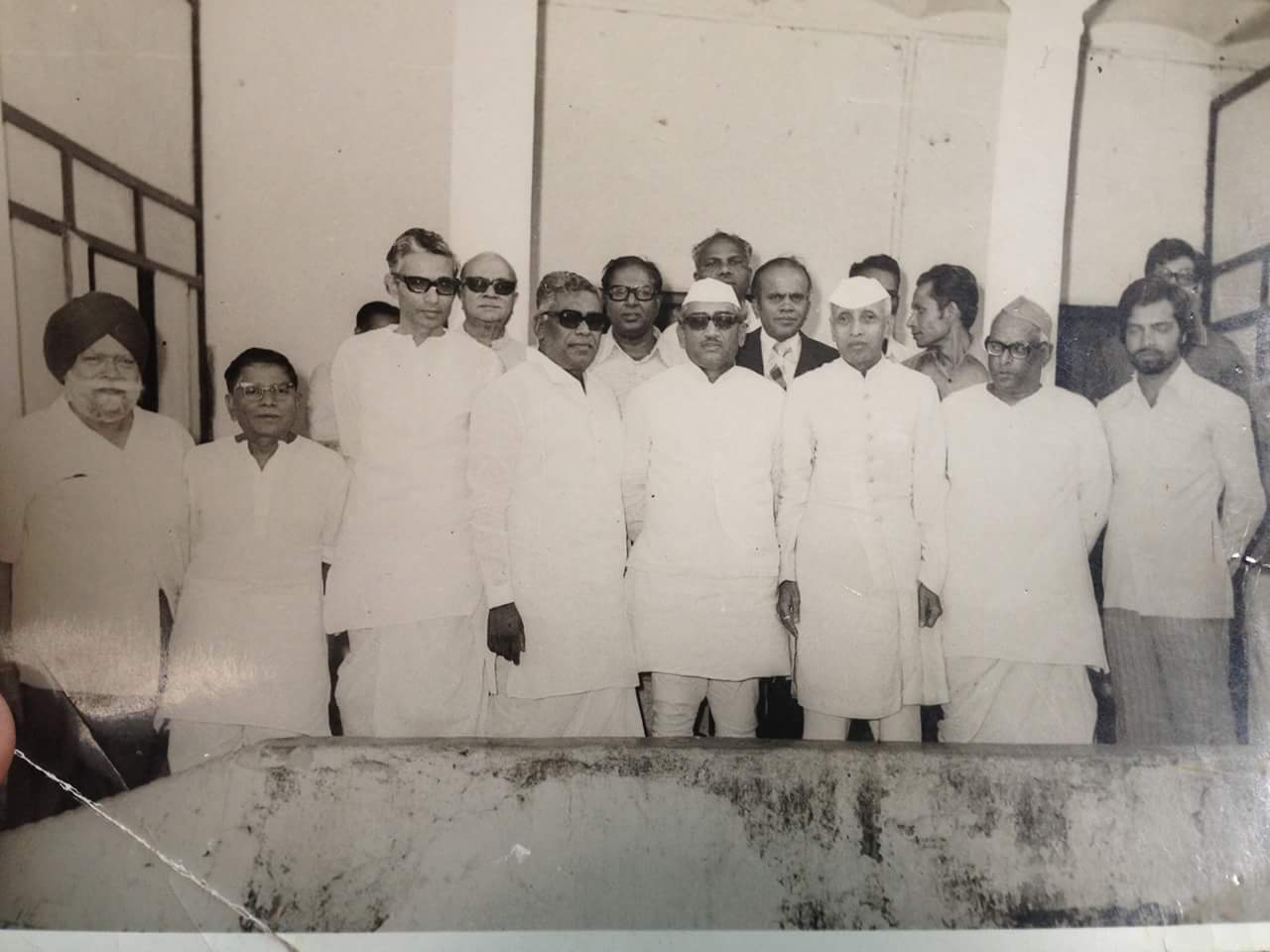
Qadri, With then Chief Minister of U.P Hemvati Nandan Bahuguna and other Notables

== Early life ==
Qadri was born in Hyderabad State on 9 August 1909 to Shamsullah Qadri and Mahboob Begum Qadri in an academic family that was well known in literary circles. He was the eldest son. He had two younger brothers Imdadullah Qadri and Saadullah Qadri. His father was an author. and was the First Researcher of Deccaniyat

In 1946, Qadri was the first Journalist of Hyderabad State to write in favor of one nation theory in Urdu News Daily Saltanat.

== Works ==
- Muhamid e Osman
- Tanqid-i-Qamus-ul-Mashahir : 1934
- Mir Hasan Dehelvi : 1931
- Qamus-ul-Mashahir : 1933
- Naveed e Massarat : 1934
- Usman-Namah : Literary and historical miscellany 16 May 1934
- Mazamir (Kalaam-e-Majmua): 1935
- Memoirs of Chand Bibi: The Princess of Ahmadnagar 1939
- Savaneh chand Bibi
- Azeem mujahid e Azadi Pandit Jawaharlal Nehru 1942
- Fateh Azadi 1947
- Hind Nama : 15 August 1949
- Jawahar Nama 1950
- Hyderabad Nama 1953
- Andhra Nama : 24 October 1958
- Nazr-e-Aqeedat 1966
- Bahadur Nama : a humble tribute in 62 stanzas to Shri Lal Bahadur Shastri, March 1965.
- Tarana-e-Iqhlaas : a humble tribute in 52 stanzas 1968
- Muguam-e-Ghalib : 1969
- Paayam e Gandhi ( Message of Gandhi ) 100 stanzas 24 December 1969 released by Khan Abdul Ghaffar Khan.
- Indira Nama 1970
- Priyadarshini Gatha 1971
- Indira Sumanjali 1972
- Qisa e Sanjan 1973
- 25 years of India's progress 1973

== See also ==
- List of Indian writers
