= Sikander Jah, Asaf Jah III =

Nizam of Hyderabad from 1803 to 1829

Sikander Jah Mir Akbar Ali Khan Siddiqi
- Nizam-ul-Mulk
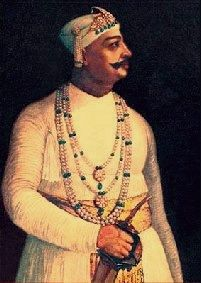
- Portrait of Sikander Jah

3rd Nizam of Hyderabad State
- Reign: 6 August 1803 – 21 May 1829
- Predecessor: Nizam Ali Khan
- Successor: Nasir-ud-Daulah
- Born: Mir Akbar Ali Khan Siddiqi; 11 November 1768; Chowmahalla Palace (Khilwat), Hyderabad, Hyderabad State (now in Telangana, India)
- Died: 21 May 1829 (aged 61); Hyderabad, Hyderabad State (now in Telangana, India)
- Burial: Mecca Masjid, Hyderabad, Hyderabad State (now in Telangana, India)
- Spouse: Jahan Parwar Begum; Fazilat-un-Nisa Begum
- Issue: Nasir-ud-Daulah; Samsam-ud-Daulah Mir Bashir ud-Din Ali Khan; Mubarez-ud-Daulah; Mir Tafazul Ali Khan Saif-ul-Mulk; Jamal-un-Nisa Begum; Kamal-un-Nisa Begum; Sultan-un-Nisa Begum; Namdar-un-Nisa Begum; Hashmat-un-Nisa Begum
Regnal name
- Nawab Mir Akbar Ali Khan Siddiqi Bahadur, Sikander Jah, Asaf Jah III
- Father: Nizam Ali Khan Asaf Jah II
- Mother: Tinat-un-Nisa Begum

Sikander Jah, Asaf Jah III Mir Akbar Ali Khan Siddiqi (11 November 1768 – 21 May 1829), was the 3rd Nizam of Hyderabad, India from 1803 to 1829. He was born in Chowmahalla Palace in the Khilwath, the second son of Asaf Jah II and Tahniat un-nisa Begum.

== Family ==
Consorts

One of his wives was Jahan Parwar Begum, also known as Hajji Begum. She was the daughter of Azim ul-Umara also known as Ma'ali Mian and Farzand Begum. She was the granddaughter of Aristu Jah, from whom she inherited Purani Haveli (lit. "Old mansion"), and the niece of Munir ul-Mulk. She was the mother of Mir Tafazzul Ali Khan, also known as Mir Badsha, and Namdar-un-Nisa Begum. She died on 21 May 1853. Another wife was Fazilat-un-nisa Begum also known as Chandni Begum. She was the mother of Nasir-ud-Daulah and Mubarez-ud-Daulah.

Daughters

- Jamal-un-Nisa Begum (died 22 March 1855, buried near her husband), married to Rafi-ud-Daulah, the brother of Safdar-ud-Daulah, the Nizam of Surat;
- Kamal-un-Nisa Begum, married to Mir Moin-un-Din Husain Khan, Ghazanfar Jung, Imtiaz-ud-Daulah;
- A daughter, married on 25 May 1821 to the son of Zafar-Yab Jung;
- Sultan-un-Nisa Begum, married on 25 December 1830 to Mohammed Sultan-ud-din Khan, Sabqat Jang, Muhtasham-ud-Daula, son of Nawab Shams-ul-Umara Bahadur;
- Namdar-un-Nisa Begum, married on 15 August 1839 to Mir Abdul Qasim Sohrab Jang Moin-ud-Daulah, a relative of Mir Alam;
- Hashmat-un-Nisa Begum, married to Shams ul-Umara, Vikar ul-Umara, Amir-i-Kabir, Iqtidar ul-Mulk, Iqtidar ud-Daulah, Nawab Abul Khair Khan Bahadur;

== Official name ==
His original names were Sikandar Jah, Asaf ul-Mulk, Asad ud-Daula, Walashan Nawab Mir Akbar 'Ali Khan Siddiqi Bahadur, Asad Jang. He was officially known as Asaf Jah III, Nizam ul-Mulk, Nizam ud-Daula, Mir Akbar 'Ali Khan Siddiqi Bahadur, Faulad Jang, Nizam of Hyderabad.

== Military expansion ==
During his reign, a British cantonment was established near Hyderabad and the area was christened after him as Secunderabad. His son Samsamadaula (Mir Basheeruddin Ali Khan) was Defence Adviser to his brother, Nasir ud Daula, and nephew, Afzal ud daula. But he did not have any pact with the British for maintaining the contingent. The state was in a financial mess during his reign.

=== Sikh Regiment ===
Upon the recommendation of Maharaja Chandu Lal, a Punjabi Khatri and influential dignitary at the Nizam's court. 1200+ Sikh soldiers joined the Nizam's army. Around 1830, Maharaja Ranjit Singh sent 150 more men under a Sardar Chanda Singh, for the construction of Gurdwara Takht Sachkhand Sri Hazur Sahib Abichalnagar at Nanded.

== Building of temple ==
Sikander Jah not only built the Rambagh temple in Attapur, Hyderabad but also attended the inauguration ceremony proving again the communal harmony that existed between the Muslim Asaf Jahi rulers and their Hindu subjects in Hyderabad. The Nizam also granted a Jagir to the temple priest for the temple's maintenance.

== See also ==
- Kingdom of Hyderabad
- Nizam

== Bibliography ==
- Rao, Ekbote Gopal (1954). The Chronology of Modern Hyderabad, 1720-1890, (PDF). Central Records Office Hyderabad Government.

Sikander Jah, Asaf Jah III Asaf Jahi dynasty
Preceded by Ali Khan Asaf Jah II	Nizam of Hyderabad; 1803–1829	Succeeded by Nasir-ud-dawlah, Asif Jah IV
