= James Stuart Fraser =

General James Stuart Fraser
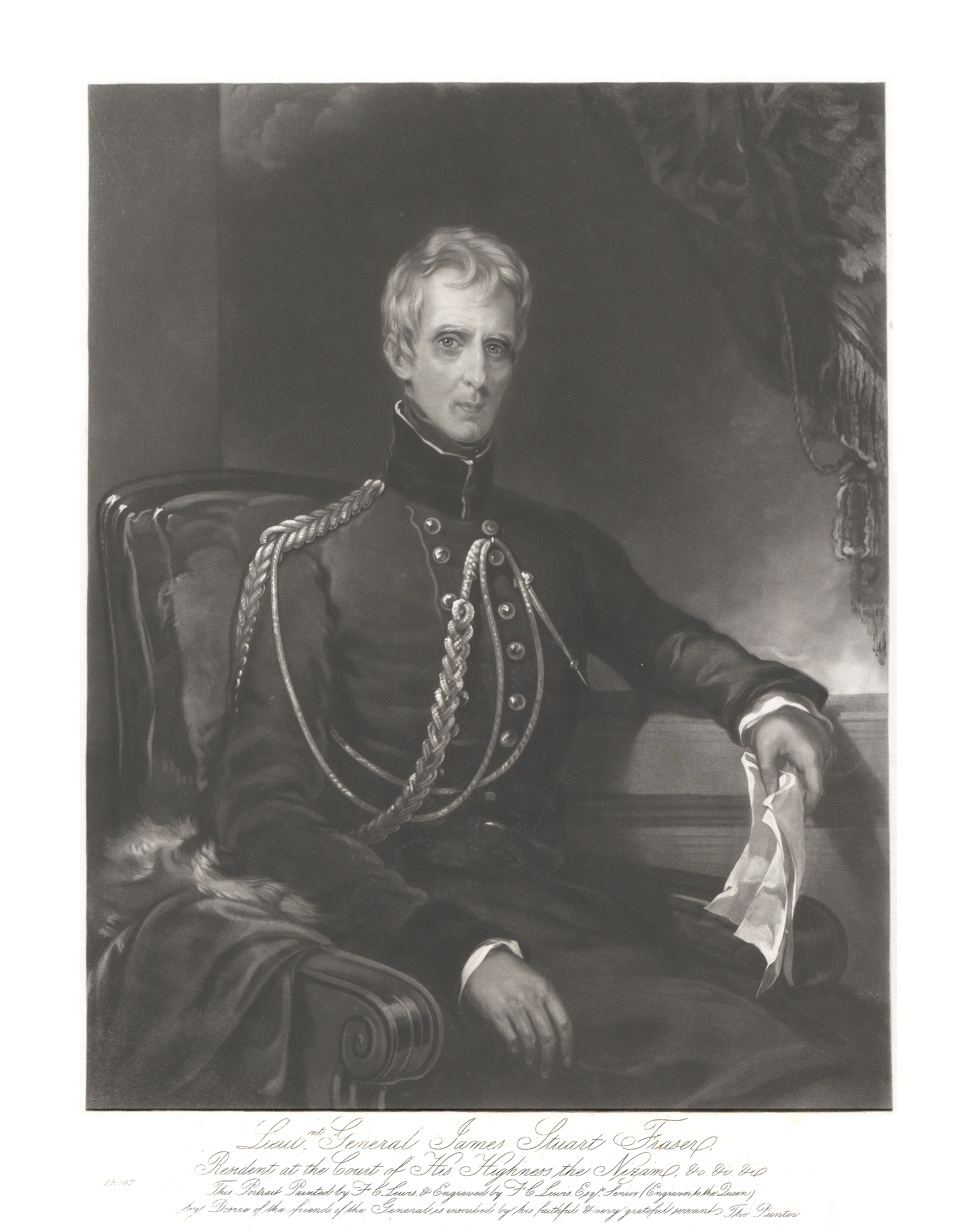
- Born: 1 July 1783 Edinburgh, Scotland
- Died: 22 August 1869 (aged 86) Twickenham Park, Middlesex, England

General James Stuart Fraser (1 July 1783 – 22 August 1869) was a British officer in the Madras Army in India. He was involved in the Coorg War of 1834 and the town of Kushalnagar was for sometime named after him as Fraserpet.

James was born at Edinburgh, the youngest son of Colonel Charles Fraser belonging to the Clan Fraser of Lovat, a naval officer who later joined the Madras army who died at Masulipatnam on 5 May 1795. James was one of six sons and three daughters through his wife Isabella Hook.

James went to school at Ham, Surrey before joining Glasgow University where he showed a talent in languages and astronomy. Joining as a cadet, he went to India in 1799 and became a lieutenant in the 18th Madras native infantry by December 1800 before becoming an aide-de-camp to Sir George Barlow. His knowledge of French led him to be involved in discussions and negotiations with the French in Pondicherry. While posted at Pondicherry, he married Henrietta James at Cuddalore on 18 May 1826.

In 1828 he was deputed to Mahé and made a special agent. In 1834 he saw action in the Coorg War and was appointed resident at Mysore and commissioner of Coorg on 6 June 1834. Coorg was administered from Mercara most of the year but during the monsoon, the office was shifted west to Kushalnagar which went for a period by the name of Fraserpet. He became a major-general by June 1838, considered a rapid rise for that time.

From the end of 1839 he served as Resident at Hyderabad in the Nizam's kingdom. This period was a difficult one and disputes with Lord Dalhousie led him to resign in 1852 and return to England. Fraser became blind towards the end of his life and died at Twickenham Park on 22 August 1869.
