= Afzal-ud-Daulah =

Nizam of Hyderabad from 1857 to 1869

Afzal ad-Dawlah GCSI
- Āṣaf Jāh V Niẓāmu ʾl Mulk; Afḍalu ʾl Daūlah
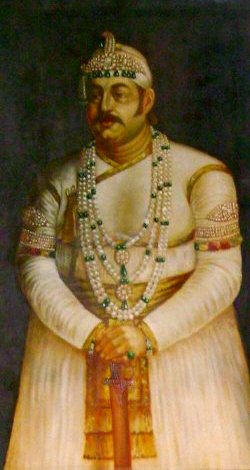
- Portrait of Asaf Jah V

5th Nizam of Hyderabad State
- Reign: 16 May 1857 – 26 February 1869
- Predecessor: Nasir-ud-dawlah, Asaf Jah IV
- Successor: Mir Mahboob Ali Khan, Asaf Jah VI
- Born: 11 October 1827; Gufran Manzil, Hyderabad State, British India
- Died: 26 February 1869 (aged 41); Hyderabad, British India
- Burial: Makkah Masjid, Hyderabad
- Spouse: Mahbub Begum; Hussaini Begum; Allah Rakhi Begum
- Issue: Mir Mahboob Ali Khan Siddiqi, Asaf Jah VI; Hussain-un-Nisa Begum; Jahandar-un-Nisa Begum; Parvarish-un-Nisa Begum; Siraj-un-Nisa Begum
Names
- Afzal ad-Dawlah, Asaf Jah V Mir Tahniyat Ali Khan Siddiqi
- House: Asaf Jahi
- Father: Nasir-ud-dawlah, Asaf Jah IV
- Mother: Dilawar-un-Nisa Begum
- Religion: Sunni Islam

Afzal ad-Dawlah, Asaf Jah V Mir Tahniyat Ali Khan Siddiqi (11 October 1827 – 26 February 1869) was the fifth Nizam of Hyderabad, India, from 1857 to 1869.

== Realm ==
Asaf Jah V's realm was divided into five subahs and sixteen districts; each subah was headed by a Subedar, Each Fort by a Qiladar and each district by a Taluqdar.

== Developmental reforms ==
=== Hyderabad Medical School ===
He set up the Hyderabad Medical School (HMS) in 1846 which later came to be known as Osmania Medical College.

=== Rubath for pilgrims of Hyderabad State ===
Nizam's Rubathis an accommodation building in city of Mecca, in Saudi Arabia, purchased by the 5th Nizam for the people of Hyderabad State travelling for their Holy pilgrimage (Hajj). It initially consisted of 42 buildings, but with the expansion of the Grand Mosque, only three buildings remain.

=== Other reforms ===
Other reforms during his reign, by his Prime Minister Salar Jung, included the establishment of a governmental central treasury in 1855.

Asaf Jah V reformed the Hyderabad revenue and judicial systems, instituted a postal service and constructed the first rail and telegraph networks. In 1861 he was awarded the Star of India.

During the regime of the Nizam V- Mir Tahniyath Ali Khan Siddiqi (Afzal-ud-Dawlah), Dar-ul-Uloom, the first regular educational institution of Hyderabad, was set up in 1854.

== Personal life ==
Asaf Jah V was the eldest son of Nasir-ud-dawlah, Asaf Jah IV (Mir Farqunda Ali Khan) and his wife Dilawar-un-Nisa Begum (buried in Makkah Masjid, Hyderabad).

Consorts He was married three times, firstly to Mahbub Begum, secondly to Hussaini Begum, and thirdly to Allah Rakhi Begum.

Sons

- A son (7 June 1858 – 23 September 1858) – with Mahbub Begum;
- Hifazat Ali Khan (2 May 1860 – 8 September 1861, buried near the tomb of Barhana Shah) – with Hussaini Begum;
- Mahboob Ali Khan (17 August 1866 – 29 August 1911) – with Allah Rakhi Begum;

Daughters

- Hussain-un-Nisa Begum, married on 29 May 1859 to Khurshid Jah Muhammad Muhi-ud-Din Khan Bahadur Tegh Jang;
- Parvarish-un-Nnisa Begum, married on 28 November 1869 to Nawab Bashir ud-Daulah Asman Jah Bahadur, son of Sultan-ud-Din Khan;
- Siraj-un-Nisa Begum, betrothed on 15 November 1877 and married on 19 January 1879 to Vazier Ali Pasha;
- Jahandar-un-Nisa Begum, married to Iqbal-ud-Daulah Viqar-ul-Umara;

== Death ==
He died in Hyderabad on 26 February 1869, after a reign of just 12 years and was buried at the Mecca Masjid mosque.

== Style and titles ==
His Highness Sir Nizam-ul-Mulk, Afzal ad-Dawlah, Nawab Farooqi Mir Tahniat Ali Khan Bahadur, Asaf Jah V, GCSI, Nizam of Hyderabad.

== See also ==
- Nasir-ud-dawlah, Asaf Jah IV
- Mahboob Ali Khan, Asaf Jah VI
- Kingdom of Hyderabad

== Bibliography ==
- Rao, Ekbote Gopal (1954). The Chronology of Modern Hyderabad, 1720-1890. Central Records Office Hyderabad Government.

Afzal-ud-Daulah Asaf Jahi dynasty
Preceded by Nasir-ud-dawlah, Asaf Jah IV	Nizam of Hyderabad; 1857–1869	Succeeded by Mahbub Ali Khan Siddiqi, Asaf Jah VI
