= Sayyid Shamsullah Qadri =

Indian writer (1885–1953)

Shams ul Muriqeen Sayyid Shamsullah Qadri
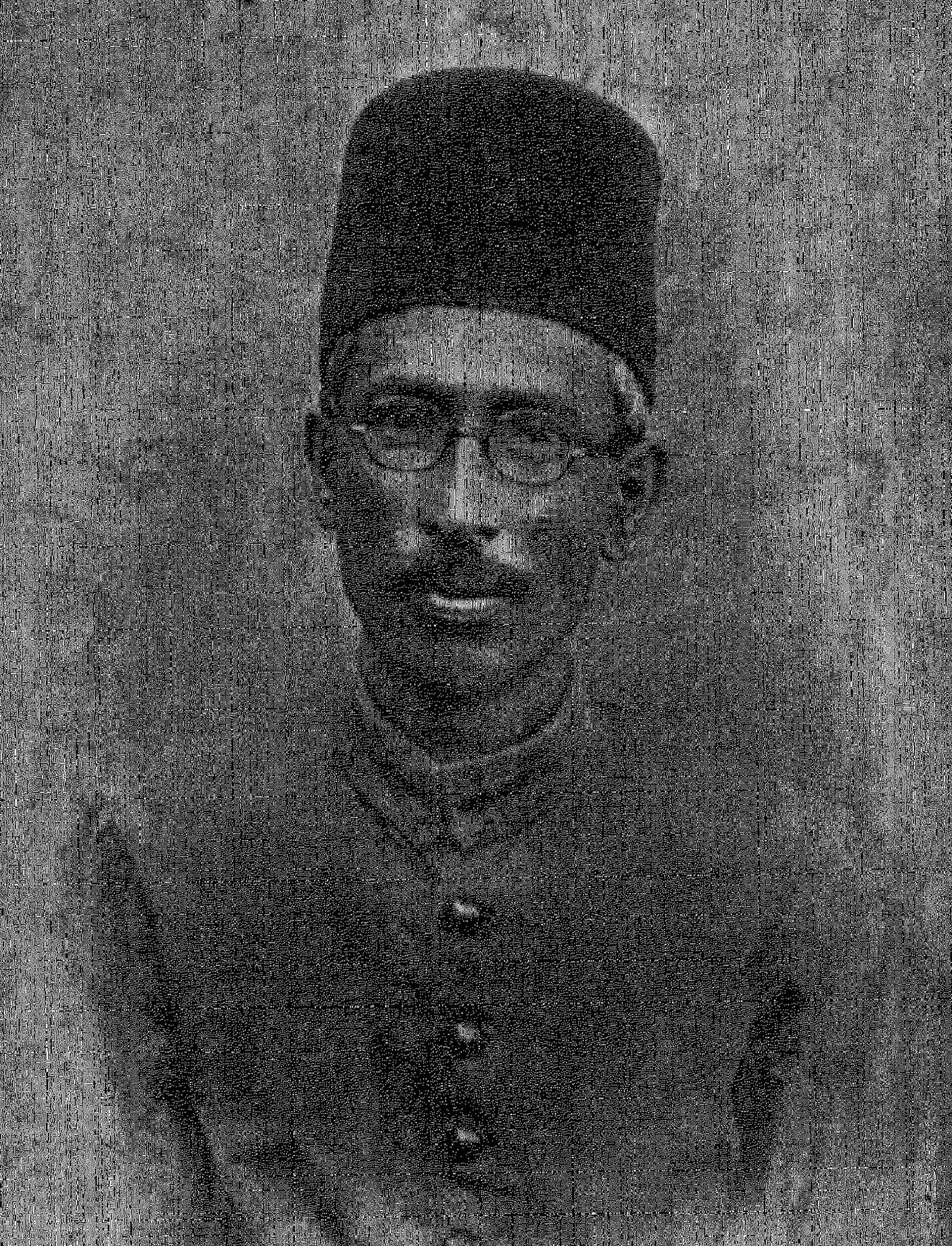
- A portrait of Hakeem Shams Qadri
- Born: 24 November 1885; Hyderabad, Deccan
- Died: 22 October 1953 (aged 67); Hyderabad, Andhra Pradesh, India
- Occupations: Urdu Scholar, Writer, Author, Historian and Archaeologist
- Known for: First Researcher of Deccaniyat
- Notable work: Urdu-i-qadim, Moʼarrikhīn-i Hind, Salāṭīn-i-Misr, Malībār, Ās̲ārulkirām, tārīkh-i-taraqqī-yiʻulūm va funūn, A history of the Portuguese[sic] in Malabar : the original Arabic text of Tuhfat-ul-mujahideen Ed., Makhtūtāt-i tārīkhī, Sikka Jaat Shahan Awadh, Tijarat Arab Qabl ISLAM, Nizam-ut-Tawarikh (A general history of Iran), Moheem Arcord :Siege of Arcot in 1751 Era.
- Spouse: Sayyida Mahboob Begum
- Children: Sayyida Shahinsha Begum, Sayyid Ahmedullah Qadri, Sayyid Imdadullah Qadri, Sayyid Saadullah Qadri, Sayyid Asadullah Qadri.

Shamsul Morakheen' Allama Hakeem Sayyid Shamsullah Qadri (24 November 1885 – 22 October 1953) was an author and scholar born in Hyderabad Deccan. He edited the journal Tarikh and wrote a history of Urdu literature, Urdu E Qadim (1925). He was an Honorary Member of the Societe de l'Histoire de l'Inde Francaise and a member of the Royal Asiatic Society of Great Britain and Ireland since 1913.

== Biography ==
Sayyid Shamsullah Qadri was born in Lal Bagh, Hyderabad State on 5 November 1885 to Sayyid Zulfekharullah Shah Qadri and his wife Sayyida Mahboob Begum. He had one daughter and four sons: Sayyida Shahinsha Begum, Padmashri Sayyid Ahmedullah Qadri, Sayyid Imdadullah Qadri, Sayyid Saadullah Qadri and Sayyid Asadullah Qadri.
