= Kashmiri Marsiya =

Islamic literary genre

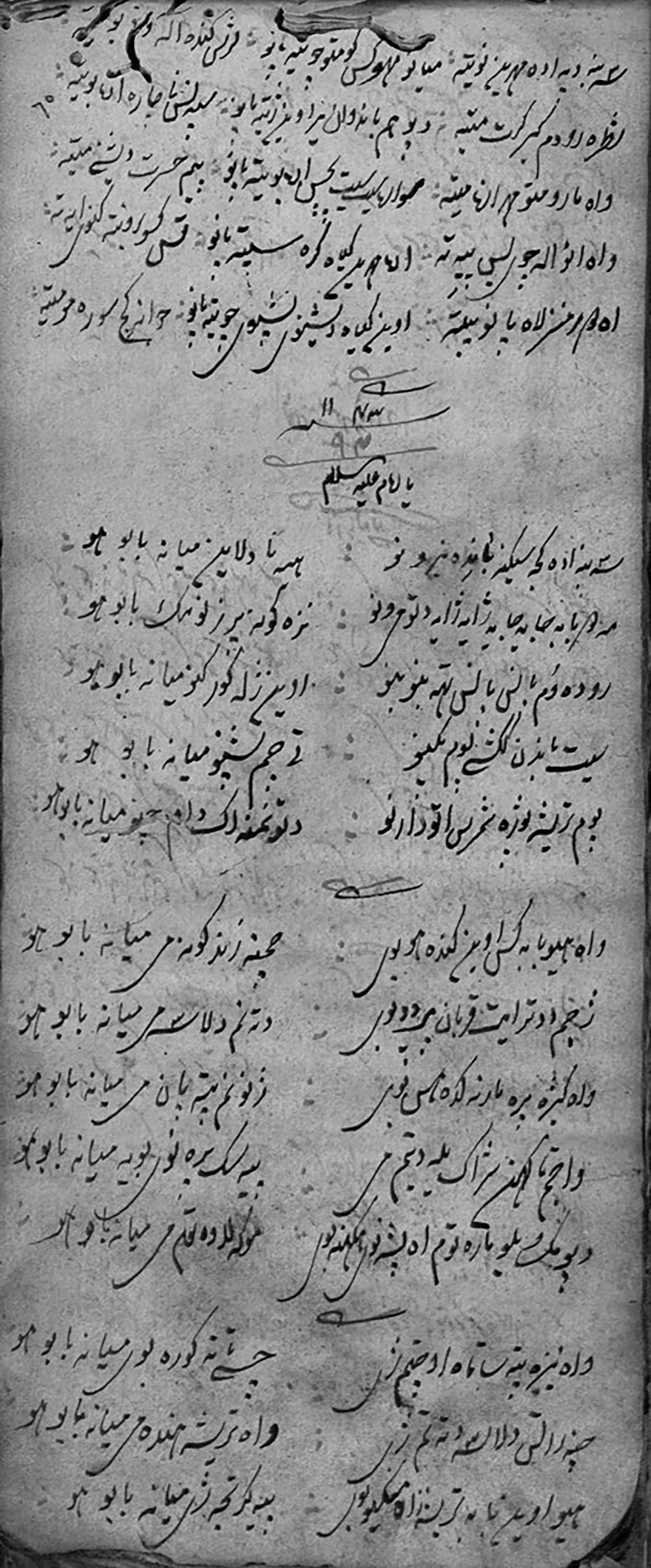
Compilation of Kashmiri Marsiya, biyaz copied in 1730, Srinagar

The Kashmiri Marsiya (Kạ̄shir Marsī کٲشِر مَرثی) is a commemorative and devotional literary genre that closely resembles an elegiac poem, which is primarily used to mourn the martyrdom of Husayn ibn Ali at the Battle of Karbala. Marsiya is a loan word in the Kashmiri language, borrowed from the Persian word marsiya (مَرْثِیَه), which is itself derived from the Arabic word rithā’ (رثاء). Unlike the Arabic and Persian marsiya, the Kashmiri marsiya goes beyond the constraints and conventions of an elegiac poem. In its classical form, the marsiya assumes the shape of an elaborate prose that imitates the rhythmic prose associated with the Quran. The writer of a marsiya is referred to as an author (musanif) rather than a poet ("shair").

== History ==
=== Initial reception ===
The oldest trace of a marsiya in Kashmiri language dates to the 15th century CE and comprises a short, loose elegy composed on the death of a Sufi, Nund Rishi (d. 842AH/ 1438CE), by his women disciple, Sham Bibi (d. 1446). The first elegies written in Kashmiri to commemorate Husyan's martyrdom also date from the same period in works composed between the 15th and 16th centuries. These include marsiya written by two poets from the Musavi family, Qasim bin Yusuf Din Shah, and his nephew Hakim Din Shah in and around 811- 850 AH (1409-1446CE), during the Shahmiri Sultanate (1339-1561CE). Another work that survives is of Ahmad, a poet who hailed from Ahmadpora, a Shia centre of learning in medieval Kashmir.

Modern researchers have characterised this period commencing with the rule of Sultan Sikandar (r. 1389-1413 CE) and ending with the demise of the short-lived Shia Chak Sultanate (1561–1586 CE), as the first stage in the development of Kashmiri marsiya. Significantly contemporary medieval texts originating from within Kashmiri Shia circles make no mention of Muharram assemblies to commemorate the martyrdom of Husayn ibn Ali, or of traditions linked with the writing of marsiya in Kashmiri. This includes both hagiographical works (tazkira's) as well as political histories (tarikh's) of the region authored by Shia writers.

Aside from a few anonymous works, the names of the following poets who composed marsiya in this period survive:

Kashmiri Marsiya Writers ( 15th–16th century)
A	H	Q
Ahmad	Hakim bin Musa ibn Yusuf Din Shah	Qasim ibn Yusuf Din Shah

=== Development ===
The development of the Kashmiri marsiya coincides with Mughal (1586–1753 CE) and Afghan rule (1753–1819 CE) in Kashmir. This period saw the consolidation of Persian, both as the court language, as well as the preferred language of the urban elite, completely eclipsing native Kashmiri. Many Persian poets who arrived at the Mughal court from Persianate lands, made Kashmir their home, settling down in the capital city, Srinagar. Some, including two poet laureates ( malik-u shoura) at the imperial court are buried in the cemetery of poets (Kashmiri: Mazar-i Shoura or Mazar-e-Shura) located on the foothills of Takht-i Suleiman, Srinagar. With the official promotion of Persian, the vernacular Kashmiri went through a period of steady decline. This is also witnessed in the marsiya written during this time. Ahmadpora in North Kashmir served as a major nucleus for marsiya writing during this period, with many sayyids from the Rizvi family following this tradition. Some of the prominent poets who composed marsiya during this time include:

Kashmiri Marsiya Writers ( 17th-mid 18th century)
A	M	Q
Aqa Sayyid Mahmud Tabrizi	Mir Sayyid Muhammad Abbas	Qazi Ahmad Ali
B	Mir Sayyid Muhammad Jafar	Qazi Ahmad Din
Baba Muhammad Jawad	Mirza Jawad Ali Khan Kaani	S
H	Mirza Jaza-al Lah	Sayyid Fakhir
Hassan Khan ibn Muhammad Taqi	Muhammad Yahya ibn Ahmad Khan	Sayyid Jafar Najafi
K	Muhammad Azam	Sayyid Mir Arab Shah
Khawja Muhammad Fazil	Mulla Abul Hakim Sateh	Sayyid Mir Muhammad Abbas
Khawja Hassi Bhat Nadan	Mulla Ahmad Nishapuri	Sayyid Mir Sharf-al Din Rizvi
Khawja Muhammad Tabrizi	Mulla Ibrahim Munjim	Sayyid Amir-al Din Zakhir
M	Mulla Muhammad Mahdi	Sayyid Saleh Rizvi
Mir Ahmad Ali Tusi	Mulla Rehman	U
Mir Arab Shah Rizvi	Musa Khan ibn Muhammad Taqi al-Haeri	Ustad Muhammad Jafer
Mir Saif ibn Mulla Khalil Munjim		

=== Emergence of Muqam Bandh Marsiya ===
The beginning of the nineteenth century CE marked the revival of the Kashmiri language, though Persian continued as a court language till 1889 CE. During the late eighteenth century through the nineteenth century CE, a new form of writing marsiya in Kashmiri emerged, signifying a major evolutionary phase in this literary genre. Literary critics refer to this period as the age of classical marsiya writing or muqam bandh marsiya (مقام بند مرثیہ). The marsiya that emerged during this period is structured around four fixed stations known as muqam, which define the thematic content. Each muqam, in turn, completes a stanza—chyir ( چھیر)with a parallel internal structure.

Two writers from North Kashmir are credited with this innovation: Qazi Ahmad Ali (d. 1800 approx.) and Khwaja Hasan Mir (d. 1826 CE). Qazi Ahmad Ali, originally a Sunni from Varmul (Baramulla), converted to Shi’ism and formalized the muqams within the marsiya. He was a senior contemporary of Khwaja Husayn Mir, a cultivator residing in the village of Habak. Husayn Mir, popularly known as Hussi Boii (حُسی بوئ), significantly popularized the new form of marsiya among the urban elite of Srinagar. He also made innovations to the internal structure of the marsiya. Additionally, he introduced the poets of the Mulla family in Srinagar, who were accustomed to composing in Persian, to this new form of Kashmiri marsiya. Over the next two generations, the Mulla family produced successive marsiya writers.

The earliest composers of Kashmiri marsiya in the Mulla family include Mulla Hakim Muhammad Azim(1803-1852CE), Mulla Munshi Muhammad Yusuf(1798–1885 CE) and Mulla Munshi Shah Muhammad (d. 1850 approx.). Hakim Azim and Munshi Yusuf played pivotal roles in enhancing the poetic beauty of marsiya, transcending the constraints of its elegiac form. In an epistle written to Khan Bahadur Sayyid Rajib Ali Khan (d. 1869), Azim highlights how he envisaged Marsiya as a symbol of Shia identity, and also his own role in reshaping the literary contours of this genre:

Having sent that for such a long time at an adverse fate, I necessarily intended to bring out the shinning pearls of its sad contents, which I had spun together in new ways, and arrange it on the lines of a Kashmiri Marsiya.

During the nineteenth century, alongside Srinagar, another notable centre for marsiya writing emerged in the village of Gund Khwaja Qasim, under the stewardship of Khwaja Muhammad Baqir Gundi (d.~1834CE). The tradition was greatly advanced by his son, Khawja Abdullah, and a student Mirza Aboul Qasim (d. ~ 1853CE). The works of Mirza Aboul Qasim would achieve great public acclaim, and he remains the most prolific and popular marsiya writer to date.

During the first half of the 19th century, many Kashmiri Marsiya writers left for Faizabad and Lucknow, seeking patronage at the court of the Shia rulers of Awadh. These include Munshi Qasim, Munshi Shah Muhammad, Khwaja Abdullah, Munshi Safdar and Mirza Aboul Qasim. Oral traditions preserved amongst the Kashmiri Shia community maintain that Munshi Safdar was a close confidante of the last king of Awadh, Wajid Ali Shah(r. 1847–1856), and was poisoned due to court intrigue.

Some of the main marsiya writers from this period are:

Kashmiri Marsiya Writers ( 19th-mid 20th century)
H	M	M
Hakim Ghulam Rasul	Mulla Hakim Muhammad Azim (1803–1852)	Munshi Ahmad Ali Ghazi (1853–1923)
K	Mulla Hakim Muhammad Jawad (1891–1946)	Munshi Muhammad Safdar (~ d. 1850's)
Khwaja Abdullah Gundi	Mulla Munshi Haider (1872–1941)	S
Khwaja Husayn Mir (~d. 1820-30's)	Mulla Munshi Hasan Ali (1866–1933)	Sayyid Muhammad Rizvi
Khwaja Muhammad Baqir Gundi	Mulla Munshi Ihsan-al Lah (1838–1925)	Sayyid Mustafa Rizvi
Khwaja Muhammad Daim	Mulla Munshi Muhammad Abbas (1869–1944)	
M	Mulla Munshi Muhammad Ali (1829–1902)	
Mirza Aboul Qasim (~ d. 1853)	Mulla Munshi Muhammad Qasim (~d. 1840-50's)	
Moulvi Abdullah Ansari	Mulla Munshi Muhammad Sadiq (1897–1972)	
Mulla Hakim Abdullah (d. 1887)	Mulla Munshi Muhammad Yusuf (1798–1885)	
Mulla Hakim Habib-al Lah (1852–1904)	Mulla Munshi Mustafa Ali (1814–1889)	
Mulla Hakim Hasan Ali (1870–1915)	Mulla Munshi Shah Muhammad (~d. 1850's)	

In the post-Independence period, the tradition of writing marsiya was greatly reduced, with most poets engaging in composing in the easier, shorter genre of nauha. Some writers who have produced marsiya that are recited publicly include, Sayyid Aboul Hassan Zigum, Sayyid Anis Kazmi and Sayyid Muhammad Chatergami.

The main writers from this time are:

Kashmiri Marsiya Writers (mid 20th century- onwards)
A	S	Z
Aga Sayyid Abbas Musavi	Sayyid Akbar Hashmi	Zulfiqar Qasmi
Aga Sayyid Aboul Hasan Zigum	Sayyid Anis Kazmi	
G	Sayyid Asad-ul Lah Safvi	
Ghulam Husayn Khaksar Gulam Ahmad Dilgeer	Sayyid Muhammad Chatergami	
M	Sayyid Sami-ul Lah Jalali	
Moulvi Muhammad Yusuf		

== Structure ==
According to Hakim Ghulam Safdar Hamdani, Kashmiri marsiya evolved from a native tradition used to mourn the death of a family member, known as vān (وان). Expressed in the vernacular, vān in its original form does not assume a poetic structure, nor does it seem to have been consigned to text. This is a view generally held by most writers who have looked into the evolution of marsiya. The arrival of Muslim preachers in Kashmir during the fourteenth and fifteenth centuries resulted in the gradual introduction of practices and traditions prevalent in the Islamic world into Kashmiri society, including that of marsiya. A surviving marsiya from this period starts with a verse in Persian followed by its translation in Kashmiri in the same meter.

In its classical form, the marsiya is divided into four thematic sections: hamd (حمد), na’at (نعت), madah or maqabat (منقبت), and dard (درد). Sometimes, a marsiya may also include a small section of supplications (dua), but this is very rare. The elegiac content is limited to the last section, dard. While hamd and na’at are based on a single chyir (stanza), madah sometimes includes multiple chyir. The dard section of the marsiya comprises twelve to fourteen chyir, though this can sometimes extend up to nineteen. Each chyir is further divided into verses of varying length, based on the nature of sound: ascending or descending in which they are recited. This recital quality of the verse also defines its metrical pattern, wazn (Kashmiri: وزن ). Based on the wazn, verses in each chyir are classified as barkhast, dounbala, gat, kreikh, puot-gat and nishast. Each component retains a different qafiya (rhyming pattern) and radif (refrain word) which gets repeated in subsequent chyir.

Unlike marsiya in Arabic, Persian or Urdu, the classical Kashmiri marsiya is nearer to the tradition of masnavi, with each marsiya composed under a specific title (Kashmiri: unwan). The title of a marsiya, dictates the writer's choice and selection of words, phrases, metaphors, and other literary devices. Similarly, much like in Persian masnavi, the initial section of a Kashmiri marsiya includes introductory and body paragraphs (chyir) in praise of Allah (hamd), in praise of Prophet Muhammad (na’at), his family the Ahl-i Bayt (madah) before proceeding to the elegiac section (dard). In his marsiya with the title 'Dar' (The Door), Hakim Azim starts by invoking Allah in these verse:

Yā Allāh Humēsha soun dāb jurm-o khatā

Choun bāb jūd-o 'atā

(transl.) O Lord! Our ways are of incessant crimes and transgressions

Yet we arrive at your threshold, of generosity and benevolence

== Title (unwan) ==
A marsiya is composed keeping in consideration the title (unwan), which is adopted for it. The unwan serves as the framed plot for the marsiya which is then elaborated in the various thematic sections of the work. Some major titles under which marsiya have been composed include:

Category	Title	Category	Title	Category	Title	Category	Title	Category	Title
Religious subjects	Allah-o Akbar	Crafts & Profession	Ahangiri	Innate objects	Aayena	Body parts	Bazoo	Emotions & Acts	Dosti
Religious subjects	Asul-i Din	Crafts & Profession	Hikmat	Innate objects	Aftab	Body parts	Chashm	Emotions & Acts	Duzhdi
Religious subjects	Faro-I Din	Crafts & Profession	Insha	Innate objects	Angushtri	Body parts	Dast	Emotions & Acts	Hasad
Religious subjects	Hajj	Crafts & Profession	Kakazgiri	Innate objects	Biyaz	Body parts	Dil	Emotions & Acts	Haya
Religious subjects	Hamd-o Sipas	Crafts & Profession	Kar	Innate objects	Chirag	Body parts	Dimag	Emotions & Acts	Jahalat
Religious subjects	Imammat	Crafts & Profession	Kimiya	Innate objects	Gouhar	Body parts	Gosh	Emotions & Acts	Khamoshi
Religious subjects	Jihad	Crafts & Profession	Naqashi	Innate objects	Hina	Body parts	Jism	Emotions & Acts	Khayal
Religious subjects	Kaaba	Crafts & Profession	Padshahi	Innate objects	Jahaz	Body parts	Mou	Emotions & Acts	Riya
Religious subjects	Karbala	Crafts & Profession	Qazi	Innate objects	Kishti	Body parts	Nakhun	Emotions & Acts	Sabr
Religious subjects	Miraj	Crafts & Profession	Rangrezi	Innate objects	Kuh	Body parts	Pusht	Emotions & Acts	Sharafat
Religious subjects	Nimaz	Crafts & Profession	Sahafi	Innate objects	Lal	Body parts	Qafas	Emotions & Acts	Tifli
Religious subjects	Paigambiri	Crafts & Profession	Sarafi	Innate objects	Libas	Body parts	Rou	Emotions & Acts	Ulfat
Religious subjects	Quran	Crafts & Profession	Saudagiri	Innate objects	Mashk	Body parts	Zuban	Historical Personalities	Dara
Religious subjects	Ramzan	Crafts & Profession	Waaz	Innate objects	Namak	Nature	Aab	Historical Personalities	Issa
Religious subjects	Sajda	Crafts & Profession	Zamindari	Innate objects	Sang	Nature	Bahar	Historical Personalities	Jamshed
Religious subjects	Shan-i Allah	Crafts & Profession	Zamindari	Innate objects	Satoon	Nature	Gul-i Lala	Historical Personalities	Musa
Religious subjects	Wahdat	Crafts & Profession	Zamindari	Innate objects	Tasbih	Nature	Hamesh-i Bahar	Historical Personalities	Sikandiri
Religious subjects	Wahdat	Crafts & Profession	Zamindari	Innate objects	Tasbih	Nature	Nargis	Historical Personalities	Yusuf

== Translations ==
The grammatical structure of Kashmiri language; the heavy dependence on idiomatic expressions and the contextual nuances with multiple layers of meaning that form the essence of a successful Kashmiri marsiya are invariably lost in attempts at translation even in languages such as Urdu. Still, there have been attempts with limited success at translation in Urdu, starting with the 1960s and 1970s. An English translation of the marsiya, Kitab (The Book), seeks to capture the spirit of some of the main verses:

Kitab (The Book) hamd

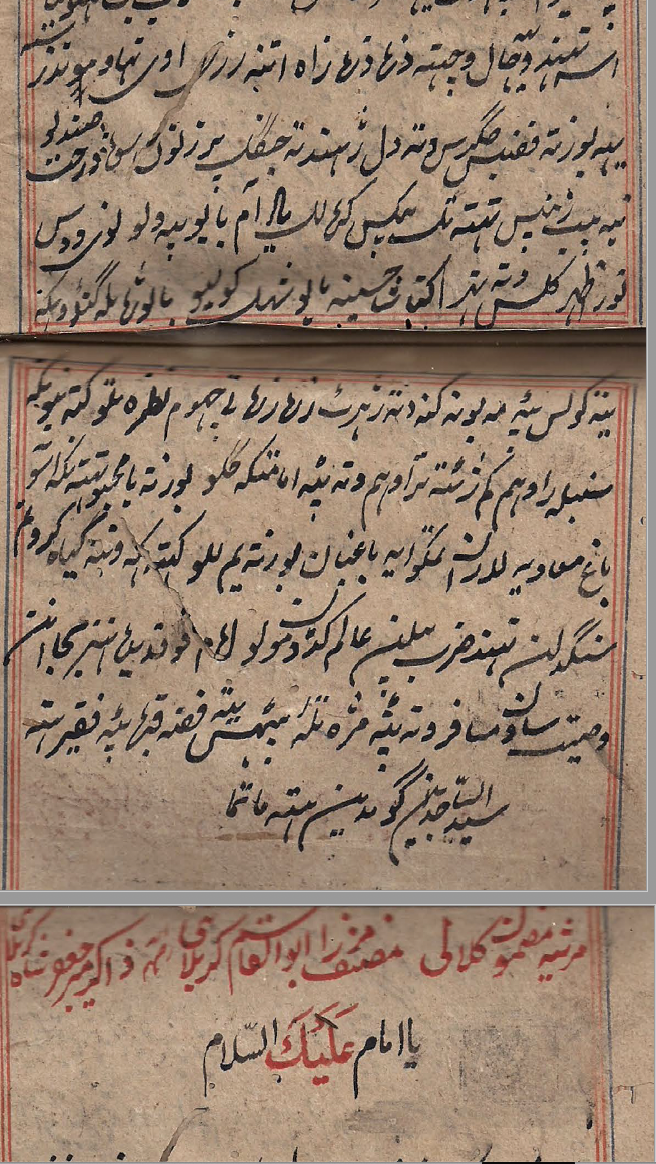
A biyaz of Kashmiri Marsiya compiled in Calcutta, 1283AH/ 1866CE

Lord! Bestow thy grace that I may pen thy book of eulogy.

Accept my offering of shukur, so I may commence my learning.

And, the light of thy essence may dawn in the gloom of my ignorance,

so that I may remember anew that eternal pledge of allegiance.

Men learned listening of thy attributes fall into veils of despair.

Oh! That one may grasp but an atom of thy creation, thy purpose.

Even the Prophet, that eloquent tongue, read la ohsee there instead.

What disrespect then, that tongue-tied I, may extol thy creation.

The universe itself is a whirl teaching thy essence.

The moon outshining the stars in perpetual motion-lighting thy creation: teaching.

And yet men at the nadir of life glaze at that page of enlightenment: first and still unread.

na’at

The page of thy messengers was sealed, when for his last message,

the Lord from the seminary of creation choose Muhammed, The Seal of Prophets.

to correct, to complete his teachings.

Angels and spirits salute:

“Praise the teacher who made the sun re-read its course, split the moon, a sign to learned men.

The un-lettered who opened the pages of God's testament.

All learners, aspirers cried, no knowledge that knows not he".

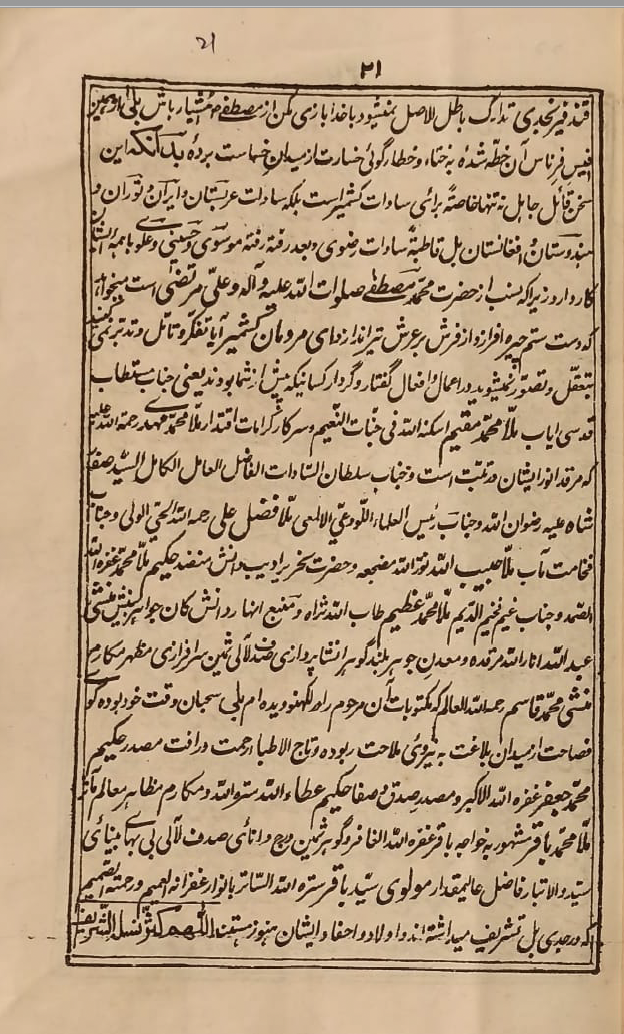
Mention of Kashmiri Marsiya writers in a 19th century work, Risala Saif al Saram

What can I then extol his grace whose eulogy is in the Quran itself.

He for whose sake, Ibrahim, Adam nay, the universe itself

was created from the uncreated self!

manqabat

In the name of Allah, the merciful, the compassionate.

Lo! I praise Ali, the door of all knowledge, all essence.

The one who cleaved, truth from untruth.

The Spirit of Islam, keeper of the Prophet's Garden, his helper.

Verily, they are the two who from the Lord received knowledge in its essence.

If all the leaves and flowers were penned in his praise

still would remain un-written, unread, his nobility, his grace.

For the Prophet and Gabriel praised him as the Lord had praised himself.

He was the speaking Quran raised on the Prophet's shoulder.

Whose pulpit was out of the grasp of the sky and heaven.

What then, can I say of that martyr?

Come let us raise the cry of salutations, heavens are his who but pens a line in his praise.

dard

Oh! What calamity, what times? What befell the Imam?

Look how the Kufi's, bookless, repaid the Prophet for his teachings.

How they honour him? How they respect his sanctity?

Look how the heads of his children's

Are raised on lances; offerings of Shumr to Yazid.

With the Quran around his neck Husayn had approached Ibn Saad at Karbala.

“Oh, tyrant! I am the sage ever ready for the death,

but know you not, that Quran was revealed to us.

Surely the world knows of it or have you not read the Sura Muhammed?

My Grandfather had preached in his sermons time and time again

Oh! Muslims I leave but two gifts with you, the Book and my Family

maintain their sanctity always for they represent me.

Lo! Today you are forsaking the Prophet's teaching,

how then will you face him tomorrow in mehshar?

Lo! But which religion asks of you to kill me?

From which book of the law do you issue my death warrant".

Alas! What had fate written for Zainab?

To re-live, re-read, recite the woes of Muharram!

Alas! her night, her days spent in anguish, in fear, in lament!

When the day would dawn in the dark dungeon

she would remember anew her nephews, her lost children,

and cry:

“Wake! The time for lessons has come it honors you nought to dwell in slumber.

The teacher is in waiting, go and pay your salutations,

Or, if with Grandfather you are studying, tell him then of Umar-i Saad

his tyranny, his acts of terror.

Alas! What fate? What destiny? I am left to lament, my family; my burden,

my arms tied; my back broken.

Oh! but that I could see,

Ali Akbar opening his book, Asghar; stammering in his lessons.

Alas! The Prophet's progeny rendered desolate.

Alas! Eighteen brothers of Zainab, slaughtered under the sword.

== Textual record ==
So far around five hundred marsiya written during the nineteenth century have been collected and published. These have been mapped from manuscripts, known as biyaz, which have been copied in not only Kashmir but also in major cities of colonial India, including Amritsar, Lucknow, Faizabad, Calcutta and in far-off Kabul (Afghanistan). According to Shafi Shauq, Kashmiri marsiya literature is the oldest genre within Kashmiri literature that has been consigned to a preserved written form:

[...] Within Kashmiri language, marsiya's are the first with a written literature.

The oldest compilation of marsiya literature in Kashmir in a manuscript form (biyaz) dates back to 1725, when Kashmir was under Mughal rule. Other biyaz compiled during the 18th century include those written in 1769 and 1794. Of the marsiya written, more than a hundred are still recited in public mourning ceremonies across Kashmir.

== Marsiya as a performance ==
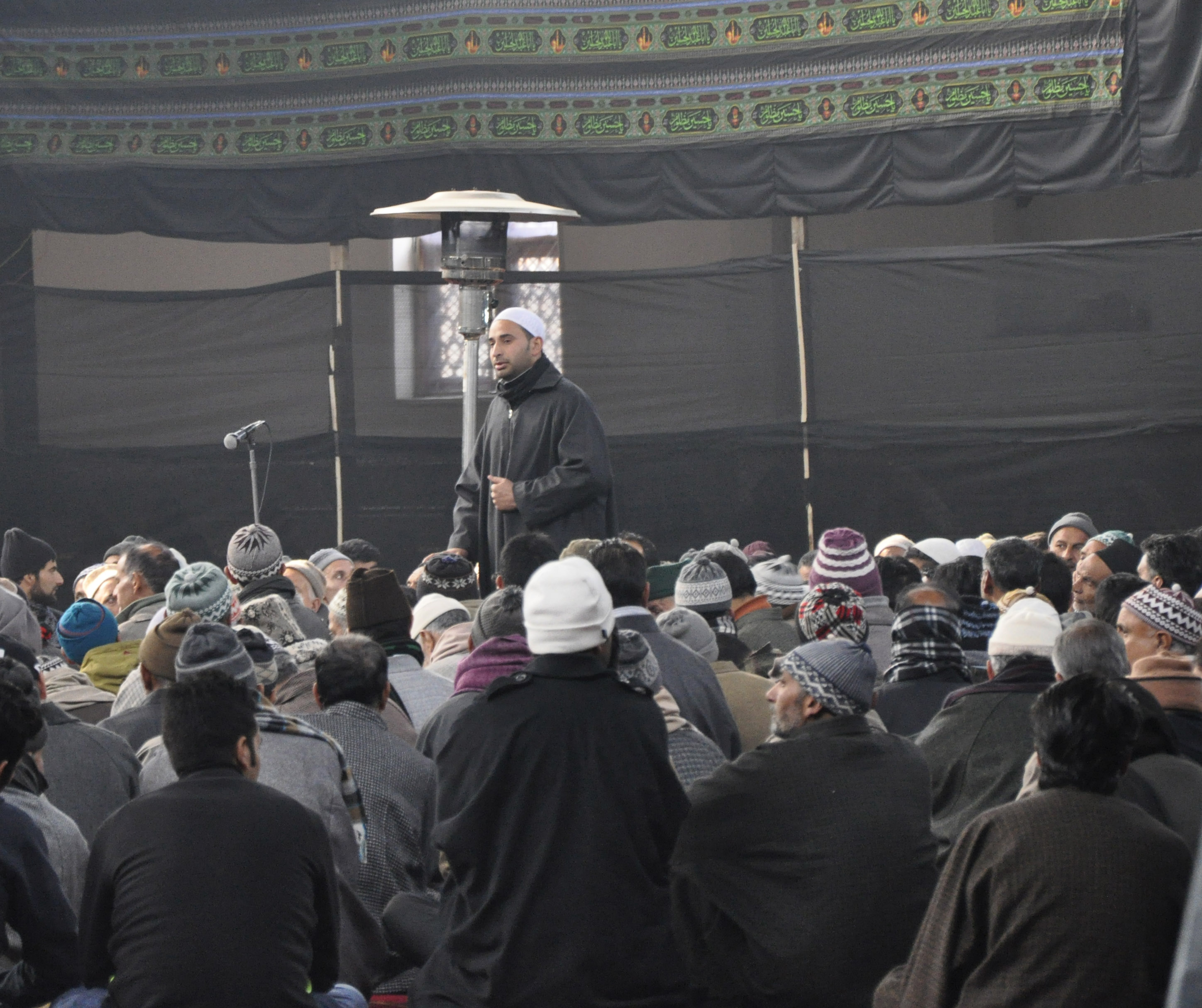
Performance of marsiya at Marak Imambada, Zadibal, Srinagar.

Marsiya in Kashmir manifests as public performances, primarily recited during mourning assemblies [Kashmiri: majlis ] held within an imambada. After composing a marsiya, the musanif hands it over to the zakir, whose responsibility is to recite it in the public. Historically, the musanif refrains from reciting his work, this is the role of the zakir. The role of a zakir is hereditary, with the right to recite any assigned marsiya being passed down from father to son.

Within the imambada, both men and women collectively recite the marsiya. Typically, the imambada is a two-story space, with women occupying the upper floor, physically and visually separated from the men by latticework screens or curtains. This follows the Muslim practice of women's seclusion (purdah), which is rigorously followed in a majlis. The primary reciter, known as a zakir, receives assistance from a group of 7 or 12 men sitting in a circle called the daireh. These men are referred to as paskhwans.

The congregation forms multiple concentric circles, radiating outward from the daireh, with the zakir moving from one end of the congregation to another. The same practice is followed in marsiya performed at homes. A jug of water and soil of Karbala (Kashmiri: khak, or khak-i shifa) is kept in the middle of the daireh on a cloth spread. One of the earliest descriptions of the performance of a Kashmiri marsiya is recorded in Sughra Humayun Mirza's travelogue about Kashmir in 1928. The travelogue describes the performance in the main imambada of Srinagar, Marak, in these words:

In Srinagar there is a moḥala Zadibal where many Muslims live, and there are many Shiʿi in this moḥala. The majlis happens here. Sayyid Shāh Jalālī is a big jāgirdār and zamindār and the father-in-law ^{[i]} of his son is trader of pearls [. . .]. All of us went to Jalālī Ṣahibs place [. . .]. After lunch we went to the imāmbāda which is near his house. The majlis starts at six in the morning and continues till six in the evening. The majlis is read in the Kashmiri language and the imāmbāda is very large. There are buildings on all four sides, in the middle there is a lower ceiling supported on thirty-five columns, under which the majlis takes place [. . .]. The buildings on the four sides are two storied, the upper floor is in wood and has delicate wooden jālīs (screens). It is here (behind the jālīs) that women sit and listen to the majlis. The lower and the central floor is used by men. From morning till evening whoever desires, may come and be a part of the majlis. When men enter the majlis they remove their coats and turbans. All the men in the congregations were bareheaded. The marṣiya khwanī adopted here is distinct from that in the entire world [. . .]. In the end, Moulvi Imdād ʿAli Ṣahib of Lahore did marṣiya khwanī (recitation of elegies commemorating Ḥusayn b. Ali's martyrdom). He stood up and said that today, I will recite a marṣiya in Urdu, because Sayyid Hemayun Mīrzā Ṣahib who has arrived in Kashmir from Hyderabad is present with us in majlis.
