= Abu Turab =

Title attributed to Ali ibn Abi Talib

Abū Turāb (Arabic: أبو تراب, lit. 'Father of Dust'), is a title attributed to Ali ibn Abi Talib, the fourth Muslim Caliph, who is seen by Shia Muslims as the first of their Imams. According to Islamic tradition the Arabic title "Abu Turab" was given to Ali ibn Abi Talib by Muhammad, when he found Ali sleeping while covered with dust.

Sahih Muslim Vol. 1 mentions a story in which the Islamic prophet Muhammad saw Ali sleeping in the Medina mosque, while he was covered in dust. Muhammad then woke him up by saying, "Get up, Abu Turab". Abu Turab's title refers to this incident.

According to Sunni beliefs: Abd Allah ibn Maslamah al-Qa'nabi said, Abd al-Aziz ibn Abi Hazim said, on the authority of his father Abu Hazim, in Sahih al-Bukhari:

A man came to Sahl bin Sa`d and said, "This is so-and-so," meaning the Governor of Medina, "He is calling `Ali bad names near the pulpit." Sahl asked, "What is he saying?" He (i.e. the man) replied, "He calls him (i.e. `Ali) Abu Turab." Sahl laughed and said, "By Allah, none but the Prophet (ﷺ) called him by this name and no name was dearer to `Ali than this." So I asked Sahl to tell me more, saying, "O Abu `Abbas! How (was this name given to `Ali)?" Sahl said, "`Ali went to Fatima and then came out and slept in the Mosque. The Prophet (ﷺ) asked Fatima, "Where is your cousin?" She said, "In the Mosque." The Prophet (ﷺ) went to him and found that his (i.e. `Ali's) covering sheet had slipped of his back and dust had soiled his back. The Prophet (ﷺ) started wiping the dust off his back and said twice, "Get up! O Abu Turab (i.e. O. man with the dust).

— Sahih al-Bukhari 3703

According to Vaglieri this title might have been given to him by his enemies, and fictitious narrations have emerged in the following centuries to give this title an honorable appearance.

The earliest non-Islamic source where this nickname for ʿAli b. Abī Ṭālib appears is in George of Reshʿaina in 680 AD.

== See also ==
- Ali
- Shia view of Ali
- Sunni view of Ali
