= Mulla Hakim Muhammad Azim =

Kashmiri Poet, physician and courtier

Mulla Hakim Muhammad Azim-al Din
- Kashmiri Poet (Marsiya Nigar)
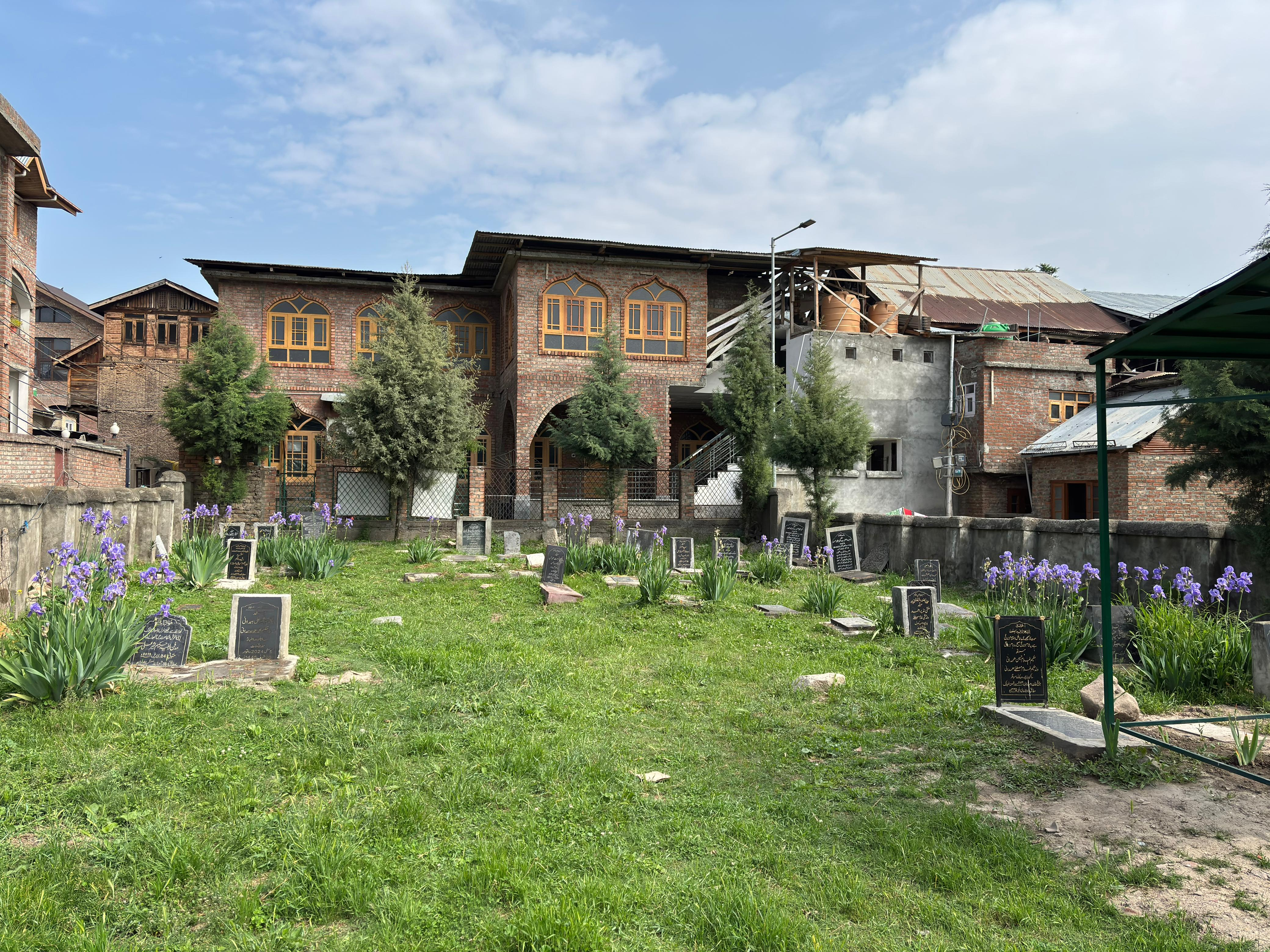
- Cemetery of Poets, Sringar (early 19th century CE)
- Native name: مُلا حکیٖم مُحمد عظیٖم الدیٖن (عظیم صٲب)
- Born: 1 August 1804; Babapora, Srinagar, Kashmir
- Died: 23 June 1853 (aged 48); Babapora, Srinagar
- Buried: Mulla Maqbara, Hassanabad, Srinagar
- Residence: Srinagar, Lahore, Amritsar, Jammu
- Issue: Mulla Hakim Abdul Rahim; Mulla Hakim Muhammad Muqim
- Parents: Mulla Hakim Muhammad Javad
- Occupation: Chief Royal Physician (Shahi Hakīm); Custodian of Sericulture (Darogha i Abri Resham)

Mulla Hakim Muhammad Azim-al Din (Kashmiri: مُلا حکیٖم مُحمد عظیٖم الدیٖن); 1220–1269 AH / 1805–1852/63 CE) was a Kashmiri polymath, physician, philosopher, astronomer, a polyglot who wrote both in Kashmiri and Persian, and a courtier, who is widely regarded amongst the foremost Kashmiri Marsiya writers. One of the leading personalities of the Kashmiri Shia community and Kashmir itself in the nineteenth century, Azim is also known in history as Mulla Azim, Hakim Azim and Hakim Azim Kashmiri. He served as the Chief Physician at the court of Maharaja Gulab Singh (r. 1846–1857), the first Dogra ruler of Kashmir. Before this, he held positions at the court of Maharaja Ranjit Singh in Lahore and under Shaykh Ghulam-Mohyi-al Din, the Sikh governor of Kashmir. A prodigious talent, he began composing marsiya (elegiac poetry mourning the martyrdom of Imam Hussayn) at a young age. By the age of twenty-five, he had already written notable works such as Qafas ("Cage"). Among his celebrated marsiya are Kitab ("Book"), Baradari ("Brotherhood"), Musa ("Moses"), Peeri ("Oldness"), Sarafi (“Money Changer”), Rau (“Face”)and Chah (“Well”) which reflect his poetic depth and thematic range. He is remembered as the poet who was largely responsible for transforming the Kashmiri marsiya from a simple elegy into an intellectual and artistic feat unsurpassed in Kashmiri language. His legacy endures in Kashmir, particularly among the Shia population, where his marsiya remain a vital part of Muharram observances. On his death, he was buried at his ancestral graveyard, Mulla Maqbara, located in Hassanabad, Srinagar.

== Life ==
=== Early life and education ===
Azim was born in 1219 AH (1804 CE) into a prominent Shia family, the Mulla Hamdani lineage, in the Babapora mohalla of Srinagar. The family traces its lineage from Mulla Muhammad Said-al Din Hamdani (مُلا سعید الدین ہمدانی) also known as Mulla Said, the first mutawali (custodian) of Khanqah-i Maulla at Srinagar. This neighbourhood had been established by his ancestors, who first arrived in Kashmir during the fifteenth century alongside the Persian Sufi saint Mir Muhammad Hamdani. Azim's forebear, Mulla Said-ud-Din Hamdani, served as the first custodian of the Khanqah-i Maulla, the principal hospice of the Hamdani order in Srinagar. His great-grandfather, Mulla Abdul Ghani ibn Abi Talib Hamdani (d. 1755), was a distinguished Shia jurist who, in 1749, completed the first Persian translation of Sharāʾiʿ al-Islām, a foundational text in Shia jurisprudence authored by al-Muhaqqiq al-Hilli (d. 1277 CE).

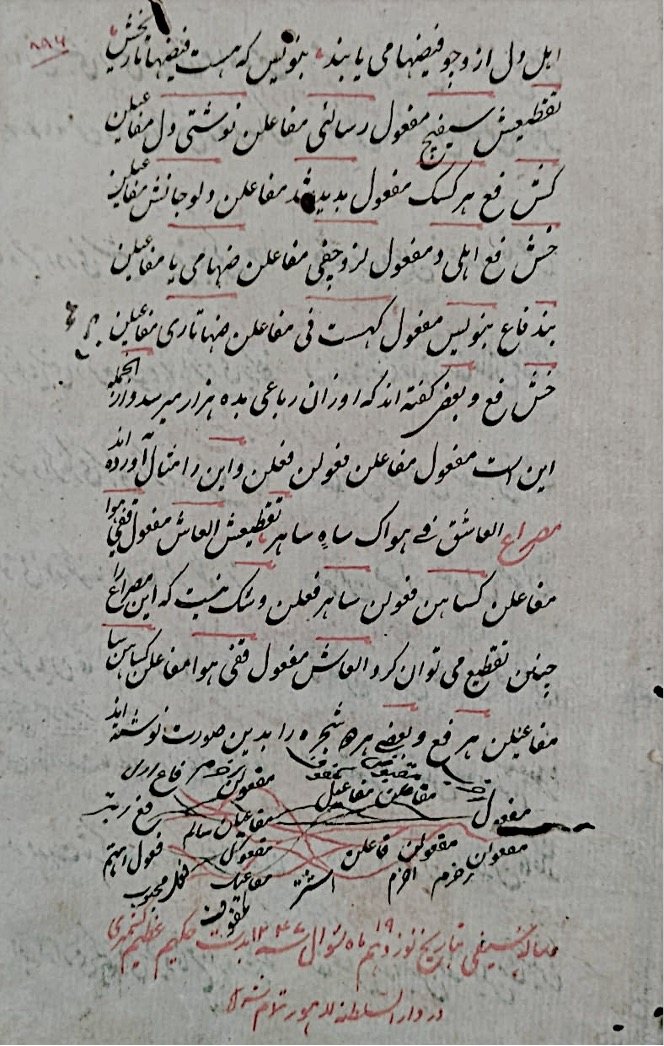
Risala-i Safi copied by Azim at Lahore

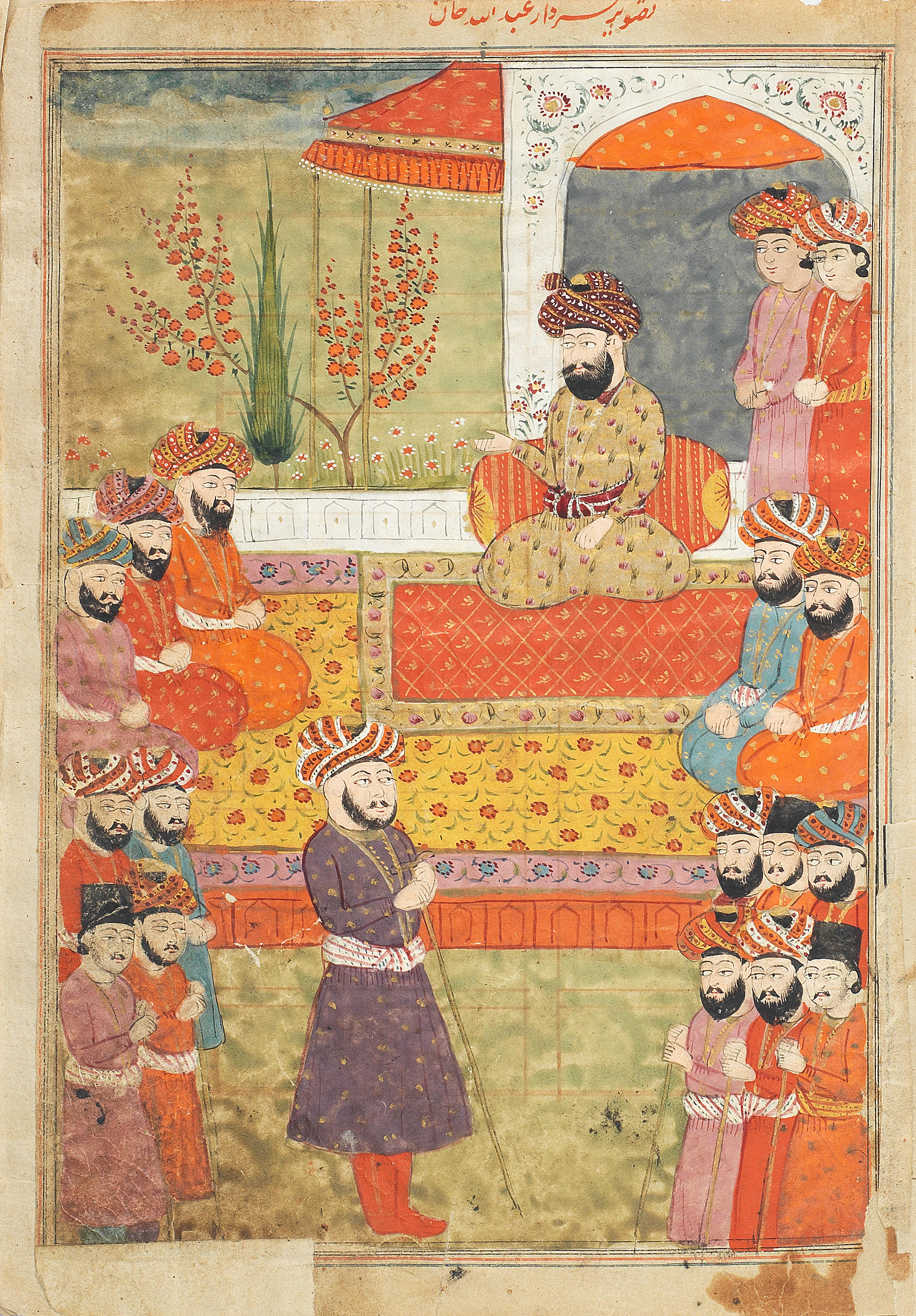
Abdullah Khan holding durbar in Srinagar

Azim was one of seven male siblings. His father, Hakim Mulla Muhammad Javad, held the position of Chief Physician at the court of Sardar Abdullah Khan Barakzai, the Afghan governor of Kashmir (r. 1795–1807). Due to Abdullah Khan's anti-Shia policies, Javad distanced himself from the governor and aligned with the royal army dispatched by Afghan king Zaman Shah Durrani under Mukhtar al-Dawla to depose Abdullah Khan. It is believed that Hakim Javad died during or shortly after these tumultuous events. Not much is known about Azim's teachers but the early part of his education would have been undertaken at home with family elders. Maqbool Sajid mentions that Azim studied under Mulla Muhammad Muqim, a distinguished Shia scholar from Nabdipora in Srinagar, but this is in no way certain. At the age of 27, we find Azim was already associated with the court of Maharaja Ranjit Singha at Lahore. It was at Lahore that in 1832, he completed his copy of Risala-i-Safi, a work on Persian prosody written in 896 AH/ 1464 CE by the poet Saifi Bukhari. The manuscript is indicative of Azim's masterly grasp on the subject, as can be seen in the way he has expanded on the original text. In addition to Kashmiri, Persian, Arabic, Azim was also well versed in Urdu, Punjabi and Dogri. During his stay at Lahore, Azim also visited Amritsar, where he had two books on Arabic grammar and rhetoric copied: Risala-i Kafi and Risala-i Zinjani. The author of Tazkira-i Khushnavisan-i Kashmir, lists Azim amongst calligraphers of nineteenth century, and writes about him:

Mulla Muhammad Azim Kashmir in addition to his command over grammar and rhetoric was also well versed with the knowledge of medicine. Probably he was employed in Amritsar, where he also used to give lessons in Arabic.

Well versed in all traditional medieval Islamic sciences, Azim was known during his life as the Bu-Ali Sina (Avicenna) of his time. A poet, physician, scholar, courtier well versed in philosophy, calligraphy, astrology, numerology, he had a penchant for knowledge and men of knowledge. Almost half a century after his death, Allama Sayyid Baqir Rizvi remembered Azim in his description of the prominent Shia figures of Kashmir with these words:

‘The one with the dignified countenance Mulla Muhammad Azim may Allah Bless his soul’.

== Career ==
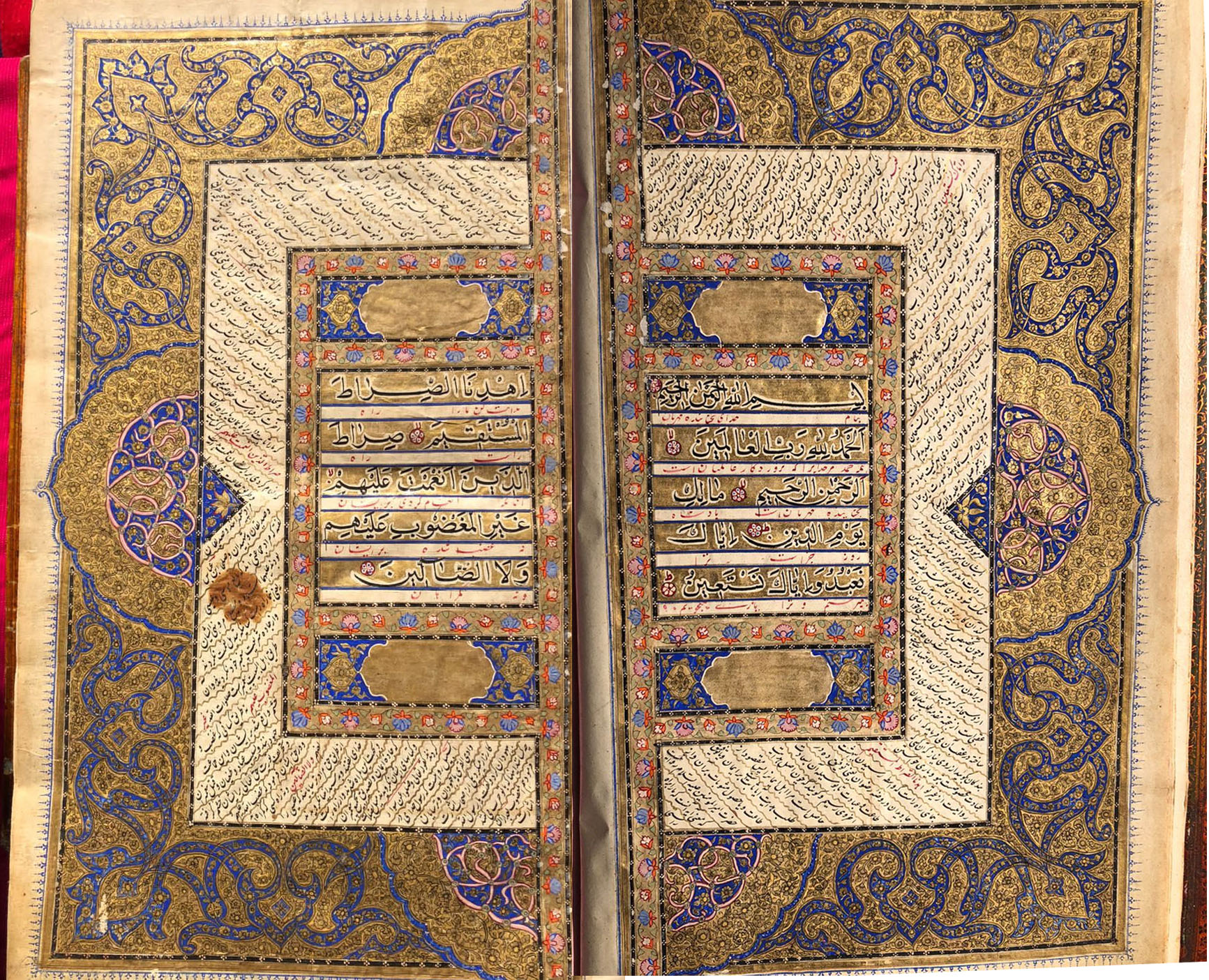
Quran commissioned by Azim in 1851

=== Chief Royal Physician and Courtier ===
Mirza Saif-al Din the author of Akhbarat writes, that Azim was one of the few jagirdar of Kashmir whose name was registered in a special diwan at Lahore, and whose land holdings were left undisturbed by Gulab Singh on assuming the control of Kashmir in 1847. Earlier, the Sikh governor of Kashmir, Shaykh Ghulam-Muhy-al Din had entrusted Azim with settling the political affairs in Gilgit after its conquest by the Sikh army in 1843. The governor had ample trust in Azim's wisdom, and was of the opinion that there was no one else at the court as, ‘mʿūtabar (reliable), danā (prudent), and fahmida (intelligent) as ʿAẕim’.

A multi-faceted personality, Hakim Azim was also responsible for organising the silk industry in Kashmir, which witnessed a boom under his supervision. In this regards, GMD Sufi notes,

In 1855 two years before Maharaja Gulab Singhs death, there was an outbreak of a silkworm disease in Europe. Two Italian experts obtained from Kashmir 25,000 ounces of seed in 1860 which registers improvement in the industry. Maharaja Gulab Singh had entrusted silk production to his Chief Physician, Hakim Azim.

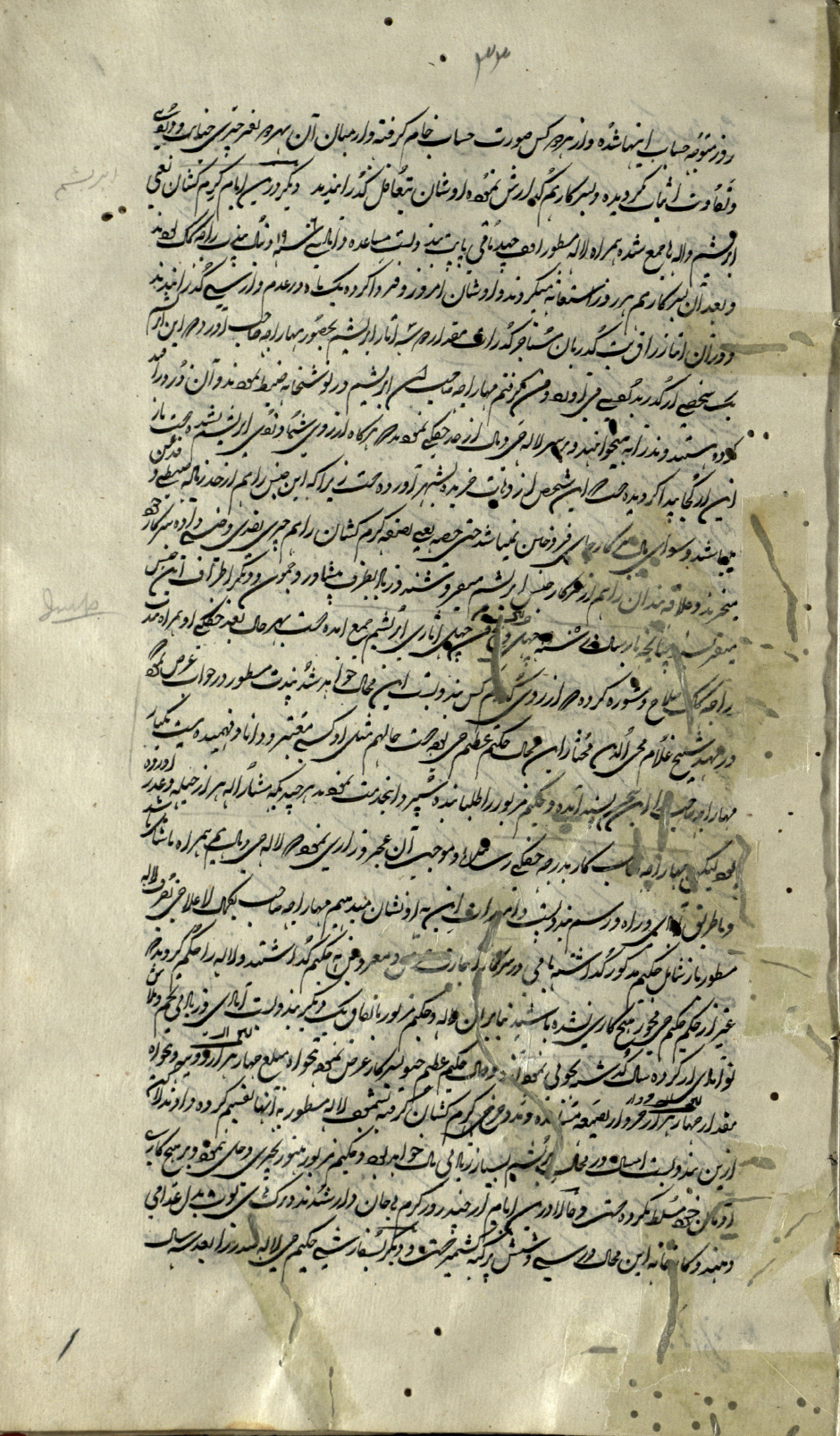
Mirza Saif's on Azim at the Sikh court

In his account, Mirza Saif mentions that Azim had also managed the Sericulture industry for the Sikh subedar, Shaykh Ghulam Mohyi-al Din. Pandit Raj Kak Dhar who was serving as the Daroga-Dagh-i Shawl (Custodian of the Shawl Industry), suggested Azim's name to Maharaja Gulab Singh for reviving the silk industry. Though initially Azim declined Gulab Singh order, he was finally forced to take own the additional duty of Daroga-i Abi Resham (Custodian of Sericulture).

It was on Azim's advice that Mulla Fazal Ansari (d. 1263AH /1846CE), a Shia scholar from a village in North Kashmir, relocated to Srinagar settling down in Khanqah-i Sokhta. During medieval period the area had served as the centre of Shia activities in the city, centred around the Khanqah of Baba Khalil, a leading Shia scholar, respected by the Chak Sultans. After the khanqah was burnt down in Shia-Sunni riot, most of the Shia population migrated from this neighbourhood. During the 19th century the area had emerged as the family seat of the powerful Hindu Dhar family, headed by Raj Kak Dhar, who served both the Sikh and Dogra court. Azim used his courtly ties with Raj Kak, to facilitate the relocation of the Ansari's. When a Shia-Sunni riot broke in the city in 1831, the house of the Mulla Fazal was also burnt and the family found refuge with the Dhar family.

In 1852, an Iranian scholar, Sayyid Ibrahim Qazvini arrived in Srinagar and started preaching in the Imambara Zadibal. His teaching became popular amongst the Shia working classes and enraged many wealthy Shia karkhana owners who were involved in the lucrative Kashmir shawl trade. These traders approached Azim and accused Qazvini of being critical of Shia faith. Convinced of the charges, Azim had Qazvini banished from Kashmir. Later on when Azim came to know about the actual facts, he was deeply grieved and would always recall the event with great sorrow.

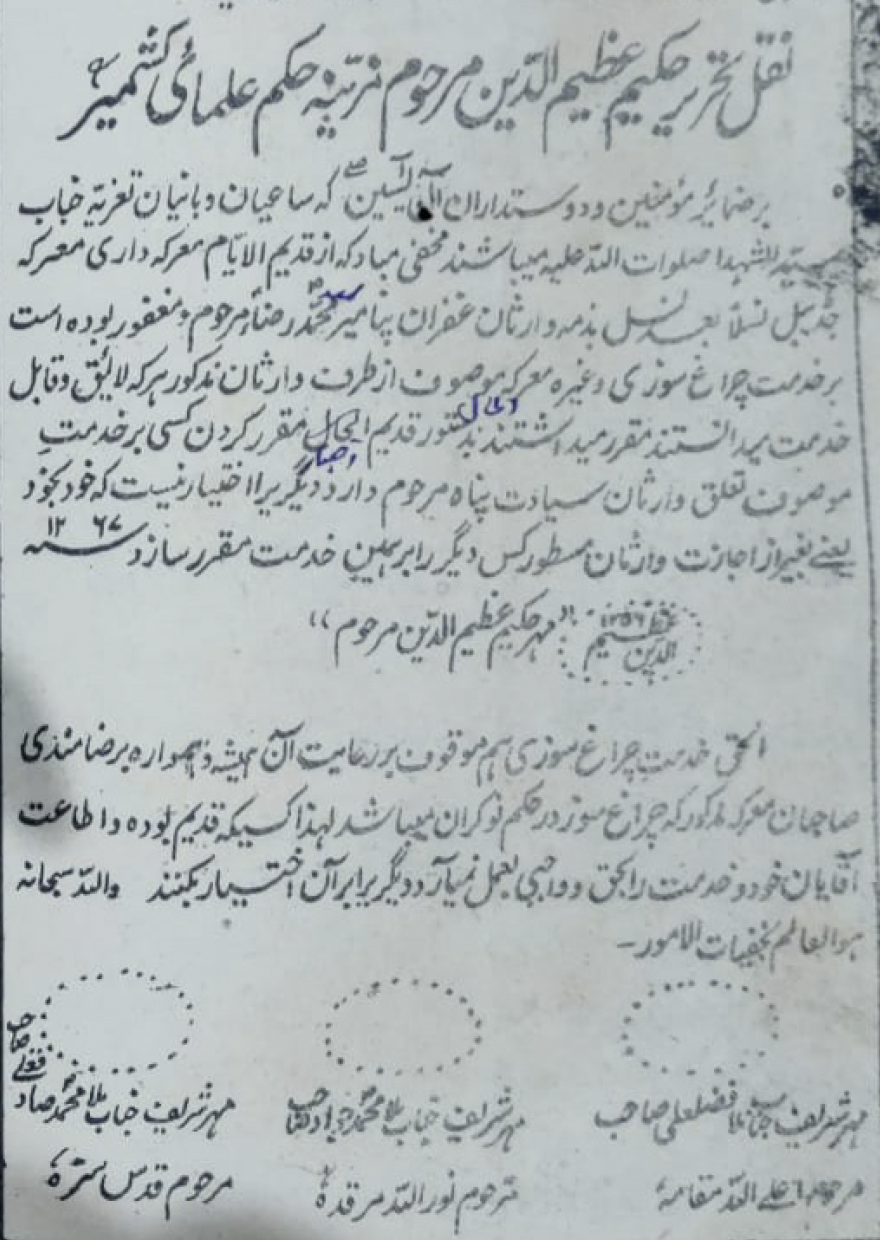
Azim's verdict on Imambara Zadibal

In 1850, when the Kashmiri Shia community was divided on the custodianship of Marak, the historic imambada at Zadibal. This issue would in later decades result in a deep rift within the Kashmiri Shia community, dividing it in two groups. Azim was asked by the Shia ulema to intervene and give his judgemen.t In his verdict, Azim supported the claim of the Marakdar family who had served as the traditional custodians of the imambada:

Since old times, the Mʿārakdarī (looking after Mʿārak) of Mʿārak -i Zadibal (the imāmbāda) from generation to generation has been the responsibility of the descendants of the marhum-o magfur (the forgiven on him Allah’s mercy is bestowed) Mīr Muhammad Razā, may he be forgiven, for carrying the service of burning lights (chirag-i sozī), etc. In the said Mʿārak, the descendants of the above mentioned have fulfilled their responsibility with competence. For the moment, they are retained in their old authority [. . .] no one has the authority, on his own without the permission of the descendants of the fore mentioned to appoint someone else to this responsibility.

Oral traditions accuse Azim of having persecuted, Aga Sayyid Mehdi Mousavi (d. 1309AH / 1892 CE), a religious scholar, on his return to Kashmir. Mehdi was seen as a leading supporter of the claim of Marakdar family, and would repeatedly clash with ulema of Ansari family who were backed by Azim. Maqbool Sajid in his research rejects this view based on the fact Azim predeceased Mehdi's return to Srinagar by twenty-seven years.

=== Revival of Shiism in Kashmir ===
Sameer Hamdani is of the opinion that Azim was a pivotal figure involved in the revival of Shiism and Shia symbols in Kashmir. His short life spans across the Sikh and early Dogra rule in Kashmir, which also mark the reorganisation of Shia community life in Kashmir. As the leading Shia figure in both Sikh and Dogra durbar, he used his influence for the advancement and safeguarding of the community which had suffered extensively under the earlier Afghan regime. The relocation of the Ansari family proved to be consequential in this revival of intellectual and religious traditions in the city. As Sameer Hamdani writes:

Given the geographical distance between Kashmir and the hawza's in Iran and Iraq, Azim saw the scholars of the Ansari dynasty as the natural choice of circumventing the near -impossible possibility of approaching the hawzas in the shrine cities for direction in the day-to-day life of the community.

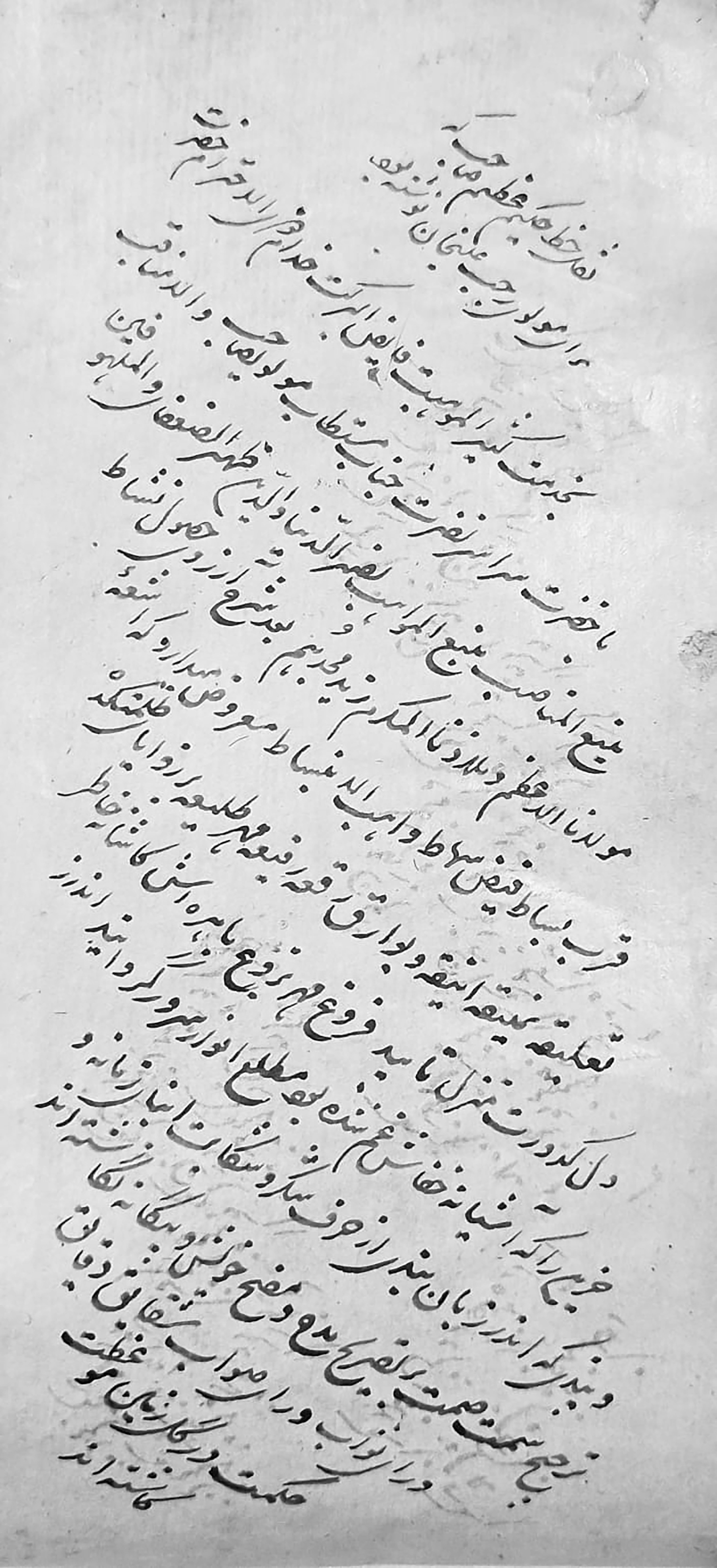
Hakim Azim's letter to Khan Bahadur Sayyid Rajab Ali Khan Naqvi

In doing so, Azim was following the pattern adopted by Khan Bahadur Sayyid Rajab Ali Khan Naqvi, whose close association with the British colonial authority had resulted in a Shia revival in Punjab. Azim was intimately connected with Rajab Ali and in one of his letters to him he writes about his efforts to popularize the commemoration of Imam Husayn's martyrdom in Kashmir.

A major activity for this revival was the devotion that Azim gave to development of Kashmiri marsiya. Given its popular appeal, marsiya served as the most important tool for dissimulation of Shia thought and history in the nineteenth century. Simultaneously with public enactment of marsiya at Imambara Zadibal, Azim in co-operation with other community elite was successful in remaking of this space as the central symbol of Shia revival in Kashmir.

== Azim and Kashmiri Marsiya ==
In the early nineteenth century, Khwaja Hassan Mir, a poet from rural Kashmir, introduced Azim and his two cousins, Munshi Muhammed Yusuf and Munshi Shah Muhammad, to the craft of Kashmiri marsiya (Kạ̄shir Marsī کٲشِر مَرثی) writing. This was a pivotal encounter, described in folklore as a "serendipitous act". Azim wholeheartedly embraced this art form, and his letter to Rajab Ali Khan reveals his deep passion for harnessing marsiya as a powerful medium for Shia awakening:

Having sent that for such a long time at an adverse fate, I necessarily intended to bring out the shinning pearls of its sad contents, which I had spun together in new ways, and arrange it on the lines of a Kashmiri Marsiya.

Azims's remarkable skill and talent in transforming a literary form—previously rooted in oral folk traditions—establish him as a foundational figure in the development of the structured marsiya tradition (maqam bandh marsiya). Recited across the length and breadth of the valley in majalis these marsiya mark a high point of Kashmiri literature.A contemporary researcher, Maqbool Sajid, credits Azim for introducing the elements of portraiture (sarapa nigari), narrative-description of events (vaqah navisi) and imagery (manzar nigari) in Kashmiri marsiya, thus dramatically affecting the overall context. This experimentation widened the scope of individual artistic expression beyond the limits of the elegiac and religious temper of this genre. Azim was also responsible for transforming the marsiya into a highly intellectualized literary genre with the use of elaborate metaphors and images, often suggesting multiple readings and meanings. Given his interests in politics and revival of Shia identity, we also find references to significant political events in his poetry. One of his marsiya, Qafas (“Cage”) is set within the background of Shia-Sunni riot of 1831 in which many Shia lost their lives and property:

O Master! you are our guardian

fortify our souls,

for our wings are clipped, flights aborted.

…..

Secure us under your wings,

we are devoted to you, do not abandon us

O you with a phoenix wing.

We are caught in the talons of a tyrant,

like an innocent dove in a hawk's,

there's no refuge for us except you,

redeem us, O Master!

It is said that in one of his marsiya, Sheer (“Milk”), Azim is said to have mocked some of his senior contemporaries from rural Kashmir. In Kitab (Book), one of the most highly regarded Kashmiri marsiya, composed by Azim in 1253 AH/1837 CE, his command over the language remains unsurpassed:

Lord! Bestow thy grace that I may pen thy book of eulogy.

Accept my offering of shukur, so I may commence my learning.

And, the light of thy essence may dawn in the gloom of my ignorance,

so that I may remember anew that eternal pledge of allegiance.

Men learned listening of thy attributes fall into veils of despair.

Oh! That one may grasp but an atom of thy creation, thy purpose.

Even the Prophet, that eloquent tongue, read la ohsee there instead.

What disrespect then, that tongue-tied I, may extol thy creation.

The universe itself is a whirl teaching thy essence.

The moon outshining the stars in perpetual motion-lighting thy creation: teaching.

And yet men at the nadir of life glaze at that page of enlightenment: first and still unread.

..........

The page of thy messengers was sealed, when for his last message,

the Lord from the seminary of creation choose Muhammed, The Seal of Prophets.

to correct, to complete his teachings.

Angels and spirits salute:

“Praise the teacher who made the sun re-read its course, split the moon, a sign to learned men.

The un-lettered who opened the pages of God’s testament.

All learners, aspirers cried, no knowledge that knows not he”.

What can I then extol his grace whose eulogy is in the Quran itself.

He for whose sake, Ibrahim, Adam nay, the universe itself

was created from the uncreated self!

............

In the name of Allah, the merciful, the compassionate.

Lo! I praise Ali, the door of all knowledge, all essence.

The one who cleaved, truth from untruth.

The Spirit of Islam, keeper of the Prophet's Garden, his helper.

Verily, they are the two who from the Lord received knowledge in its essence.

If all the leaves and flowers were penned in his praise

still would remain un-written, unread, his nobility, his grace.

For the Prophet and Gabriel praised him as the Lord had praised himself.

He was the speaking Quran raised on the Prophet's shoulder.

Whose pulpit was out of the grasp of the sky and heaven.

What then, can I say of that martyr?

Come let us raise the cry of salutations, heavens are his who but pens a line in his praise.

..............

Oh! What calamity, what times? What befell the Imam?

Look how the Kufi's, bookless, repaid the Prophet for his teachings.

How they honour him? How they respect his sanctity?

Look how the heads of his children's

Are raised on lances; offerings of Shumr to Yazid.

With the Quran around his neck Husayn had approached Ibn Saad at Karbala.

“Oh, tyrant! I am the sage ever ready for the death,

but know you not, that Quran was revealed to us.

Surely the world knows of it or have you not read the Sura Muhammed?

My Grandfather had preached in his sermons time and time again

Oh! Muslims I leave but two gifts with you, the Book and my Family

maintain their sanctity always for they represent me.

Lo! Today you are forsaking the Prophet’s teaching,

how then will you face him tomorrow in mehshar?

Lo! But which religion asks of you to kill me?

From which book of the law do you issue my death warrant”.

Alas! What had fate written for Zainab?

To re-live, re-read, recite the woes of Muharram!

Alas! her night, her days spent in anguish, in fear, in lament!

When the day would dawn in the dark dungeon

she would remember anew her nephews, her lost children,

and cry:

“Wake! The time for lessons has come it honors you nought to dwell in slumber.

The teacher is in waiting, go and pay your salutations,

Or, if with Grandfather you are studying, tell him then of Umar-i Saad

his tyranny, his acts of terror.

Alas! What fate? What destiny? I am left to lament, my family; my burden,

my arms tied; my back broken.

Oh! but that I could see,

Ali Akbar opening his book, Asghar; stammering in his lessons.

Alas! The Prophet’s progeny rendered desolate.

Alas! Eighteen brothers of Zainab, slaughtered under the sword.

One of Azim’s most famous marsiya remains Baradari (Brotherhood). Verses from this marsiya are invariably recited in the Ashura procession, especially in the procession accompanying the Zuljinah. These include Lady Zainab’s lament on the martyrdom of Imam Husayn:

And then Zainab wept,

Oh, leader of my tribe,

May I be your sacrifice;

None remains here to mourn you,

Shall I not call out to Abbas?

“Come, wash your brother; do not let the waterskin fall, yet”.

When the wayfarers see you in this state on the road,

Will they not be moved to grief?

Will they not ask,

"Who is this dead traveler—poor and alone?

Unaware of the ways of life?

Did he not have a son?

To bury him?

To mourn him in his death."

=== Marsiya written by Azim ===
The total number of marsiya written by Azim vary from twenty four to twenty eight. In addition he also wrote a number of shorter dirges including van, ravana, vazn-i doum and vabandh. Some scholars are of the opinion that Azim wrote those marsiya jointly with his second cousin, Mulla Munshi Muhammad Yusuf. The main marsiya written by Azim include:

Title of the Marisya
| Aftab آفتاب | Darakht-i Touba درخت طوبی | Khaliq al Kalam خالق الکلام | Mar مار | Qafas قفس | Sarafi صرافئ | Zangir زنجیر |
| Baradari برادری | Hawa ہوا | Khawab خواب | Musa موسی | Rau رو | Sher شیر | Laskhar لشکر |
| Chah چاہ | Kassa کا سہ | Kitab کتاب | Namak نمک | Sal o Mah سال ہ ماہ | Shir شیر | Kheema خیمہ |
| Dar در | Khakh خاک | Koh کوہ | Peeri پیری | Sar سر | Tasbih تسبیح | Safar سفر |

== Anecdotes ==
It is related that while he was in Lahore, the Azim developed a likening for astrology and a renowned astrologer of the city offered to teach him against payment of money for each class. After attending a couple of lessons, Azim ceased his classes. One day he came across the astrologer in the streets of Lahore, who enquired from him as to why he had ceased attending the classes. Azim replied that after studying a few lessons he simply did not feel the need for attending any more classes. Incensed by this reply, the astrologer asked him to solve certain astrological problems, and immediately Azim kneeled and drew the required sketch there itself on the dusty street. Displeased and angry the astrologer remarked that if he had known that the Azim was blessed with this intelligent, he would not even have taught him those few lessons.

GMD Sufi, in his book, Kashir, writes about Hakim Azim:

Hakim Muhammad Jawad’s son, Hakim Mohammad Azim, rose to the position of the chief physician of the Maharaja Ranjit Singh at Lahore. The hakim was a great scholar of Arabic and a poet. Like his father, there is a curious tradition about him also. It is said that, while going on a boat, he saw a man bathing at a ghat on the river, and perceived that he was suffering from a certain disease of which the man himself seemed quite ignorant. The hakim stopped his boat, and warned the man that he would have serious trouble if he did not immediately rub fresh cow-dung on his body, and then sit in the sun till the cow-dung dried up completely, and fell of his body. The man obeyed the hakim, and when the dried cow dung fell of his body, it was found full of lice.

While travelling from Jammu to Srinagar, the Azim's entourage once camped at Sular, Dooru-Shahabad a halting place on the route. Here Azim met a Sunni astrologer, Ayatollah (Aya Baba). Impressed by the astrologers’ knowledge, Azim bought him home, to reside and teach his son Hakim Abdul Rahim, saying,

It is a disgrace that such a knowledgeable man should be lost in the dusts of obscurity.

The incident highlights Azim's ecumenical nature, patronising a Sunni man of knowledge at a time when the two communities were still torn apart by sectarian differences, misunderstandings and conflict.

== Death ==
Azim died at the age of forty-eight on Ramzan 19, 1269 AH (July 26, 1853). The date is significant in the Shia liturgical calendar as it marks the day when Imam Ali was assassinated. The funeral prayer was offered by Akhund Mulla Javad Ansari who was with Azim on his deathbed. Historians Mirza Saif and Hakim Safdar both note that Azim's death was unexpected, and deeply shocked Gulab Singh, though Azim himself was aware of his approaching death. According to Saif, upon learning of Azim's demise, Gulab Singh sent Shaykh Illahi Baksh, a senior Muslim court officer to Azim's home to offer his condolences. On his return to Srinagar, Gulab Singh honoured Azim's son, Hakim Abdul Rahim, in an open court session, and presented him with two Pashmina shawls. Additionally, Rahim was appointed to succeed his father as Chief Physician and Darogha-i Abi Resham. Azim was laid to rest in his family's ancestral graveyard in Hassanabad, a predominantly Shia neighbourhood of Srinagar, in vicinity of a mosque built by his father.
