= Mulla Hakim Habib-al Lah =

Kashmiri Poet, physician and courtier

- مُلا حکیٖم حبیب اللہ (حیبہ صٲب)
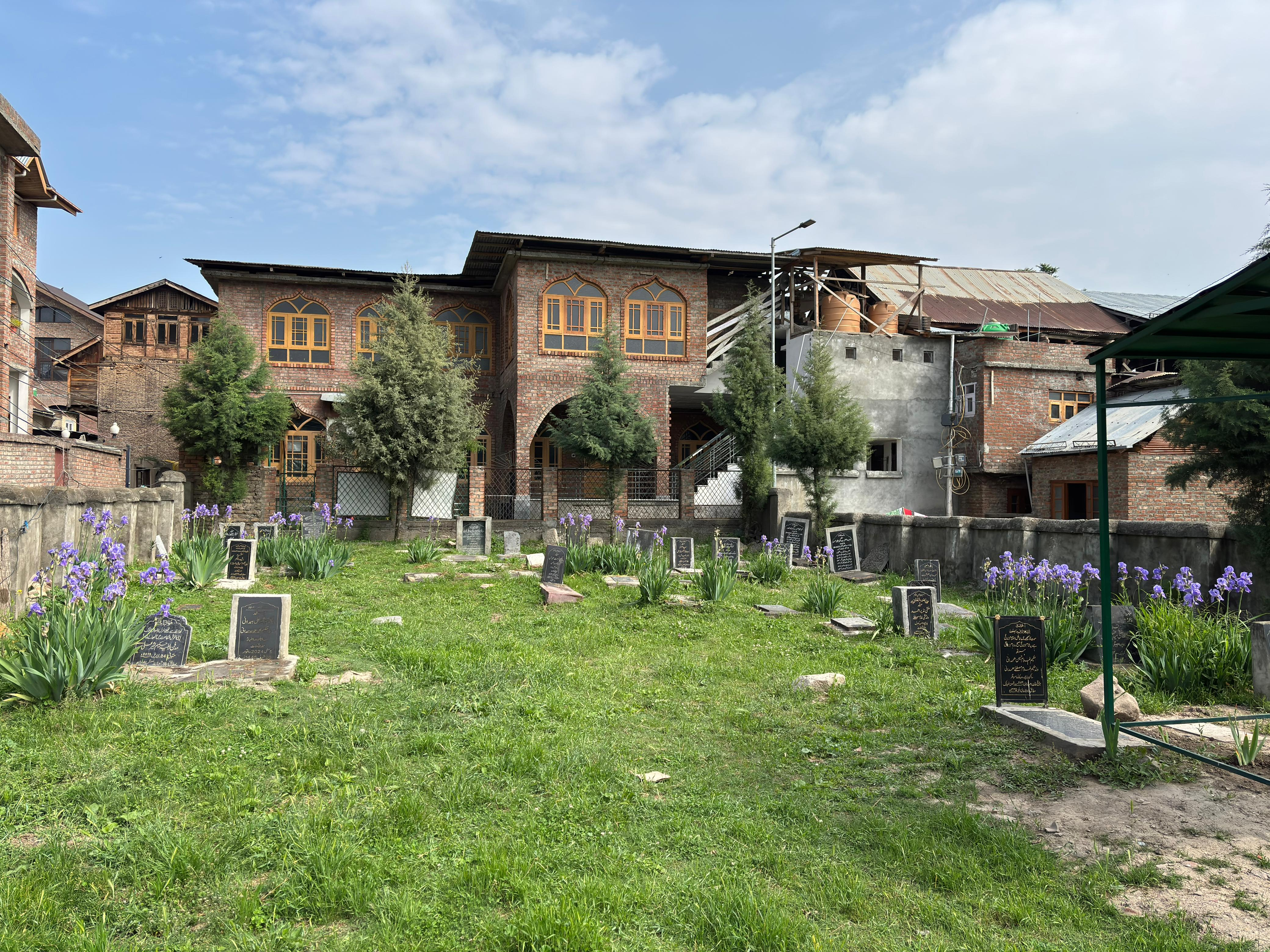
- Cemetery of Poets, Mulla Maqbara, Sringar (early 19th century CE)

Teacher Poet

Kashmiri Poet (Marsiya Nigar)

Personal details
- Born: 1 January 1851 Babapora, Srinagar, Kashmir
- Died: 1 January 1904 (aged 53) Babapora, Srinagar
- Resting place: Mulla Maqbara, Srinagar
- Parent: Mulla Hakim Abdul Rahim
- Occupation: Teacher

Mulla Hakim Habib-al Lah (مُلا حکیٖم حبیب اللہ) (1851–1904 CE ) was a Kashmiri poet who wrote in Kashmiri, Persian, and occasionally Urdu. A poet and teacher, he was deeply inclined towards mysticism and spent the last years of his life as a recluse, traditionally associated with qalandars. In the genre of Kashmiri muqam-bandh marsiya, he is considered one of the last major masters. Amongst his marsiya, Karbala, Shahadat, Hamesha Bahar, Kar and Yusuf are well known and recited across Kashmir. Habib-al Lah composed his poetry under the pen-name of Habib. In Kashmiri, he composed a shahr-i ashoub, Sehlab Nama (سیلاب نامئہ) which describes the devastation that took place in Kashmir during the great flood of 1903–4, and became quite popular. His other Kashmiri masnavi which satires rural life, Greist Nama, mirrors a similar work written earlier by Pir Maqbool Shah Kralwari. During his student days in Lahore, Habib also participated in poetical gatherings (mushairas) held in the city. His Persian poetry does not differ markedly from that of other contemporary poets of the Indian subcontinent who adhered to the Indian Style (sabk-e hindī). It reflects the nostalgic persistence of a literary tradition in a language that had largely ceased to be creatively vibrant.

On his death, Habib was buried at his ancestral graveyard, Mulla Maqbara, in Hassanabad, Srinagar.

== Life ==
=== Early life and education ===
Habib was born in 1851, into a prominent Mulla family, which traces its lineage from Mulla Muhammad Said-al Din Hamdani (مُلا سعید الدین ہمدانی) also known as Mulla Said, the first mutawali (custodian) of Khanqah-i Maulla at Srinagar. The family was initially based in the mohalla of Alauddinpora, before migrating to Babapora, Habba Kadal in the seventeenth century. Hakim Habib-al Lah was born at Babapora. After the commencement of Dogra rule in Kashmir, various members of the Mulla family came to occupy prominent positions in the court as royal physicians. Habib's father, Mulla Hakim Abdul Rahim was the Chief Physician and darogha-i abri resham (Custodian of Sericulture) in the court of Maharaja Gulab Singh. Rahim had succeeded to both these posts on the death of his father, Mulla Hakim Muhammad Azim, the leading Muslim jagirdar in Gulab Singh's court. In one of his Persian chronograms Habib himself records the year of his birth as 1268 AH (1851CE). The chronogram also highlights Habib's livelong devotion to Imam Ali who was also styled as Abu Turab (Father of Dust):

خاکِ پائے ابوتراب حبیب (transl. Habib, I am the dust beneath the feet of Abu Turab)

Not much is known about Habib's early life, but he was rendered an orphan at a young age. His mother passed away in 1294 AH (1867 CE) when Habib was sixteen years old. It is believed that his father had passed away much earlier, and Habib's education was looked after by his younger uncle, Mulla Hakim Muqim. Before his death at Kabul (Afghanistan) in 1298 AH (1880 CE), Muqim proved to be the main support in Habib's early life. In Srinagar, Habib studied under Maulana Moulvi Sadiq Ali Ansari (d. 1292 AH/ 1875 CE) and Mulla Munshi Mustafa Ali (1814–1889) Sadiq Ali was a prominent Shia scholar belonging to the reputed Ansari family. A theologian, he is said to have written many works of which only one survives in a manuscript form with the Oriental Library, Srinagar. Mustafa Ali was the Head Persian teacher at the State School Srinagar and one of the leading marsiya writers and calligraphers of nineteenth century Kashmir. After completing his education in Srinagar, Habib left for Lahore for further studies and lived in the city for some time. Habib began his journey as a poet composing in Persian, during his stay in Lahore and participated in many mushairas held in the city, including those presided by Maulana Altaf Hussain Hali. Only a few Persian qasidas,masnavis and ghazals he recited in Lahore, survive, which includes the verse:

بسکہ تیز زخم از گہوارہ خوردم چون حبیب

پنبہ زخم جگر از شیر مادر داشتم

His stay in the city, not only widened his literary horizons but also introduced him to English language. In some of his Persian poetry we occasionally come across English words and terms, indicating his familiarity with the language. A qasida that he recited during a mushaira held at Lahore includes reference to English names of medicine. We have no account of any other travel that Habib might have undertaken, but given that his father was serving in the Dogra court, it is possible that he would have also resided or visited Jammu during the annual winter departure of the court from Srinagar to Jammu (Durbar Move)

=== Marriage and life as recluse ===
Habib was married twice in his lifetime but there is no record of any surviving child from either of his marriages. According to Anees Kazmi, his first wife, Taj Begum, hailed from a Sayyid family of Anderkote and was the daughter of Sayyid Safdar Shah. Safdar Shah's mother was herself the daughter of the celebrated Kashmiri Shia scholar Mulla Abdullah Ansari, who died in Khairpur (present-day Pakistan) on account of his religious missionary work. Two of Mulla Abdullah Ansari's daughters married into Mulla family, while a third was wed to the renowned alim, Moulvi Haider Ali Ansari.In one of his most deeply moving mathnawis, Marg-i Zan (مرگ زن – “The Death of the Wife”), Habib recalls Taj Begum with profound tenderness and sorrow, though he refrains from naming her directly. Following Taj Begum's death, Habib married Kulsum Begum. This second marriage, however, turned out to be deeply unhappy and fraught with conflict. Exhausted by constant domestic discord, he began seeking solace in the city's tekyas: the Sufi hospices frequented by qalandars and wandering dervishes. During this period he also developed a dependence on opium, which gradually transformed his personality and demeanour.To the profound distress of his family and friends, Habib increasingly embraced the lifestyle of the qalandars: he took to wandering from tekya to tekya, often dishevelled and lost in mystical introspection. This radical shift in behaviour also marked the virtual end of his poetic career. Apart from the later works Sehlab Nama and the marsiya entitled Yusuf, he ceased composing poetry altogether and, for extended periods, even stopped speaking. His only reply to well-wishers and admirers was:

کافر مسکین نہ دنیا نہ دین Poor unbeliever; (gained) neither world nor religion (hereafter)

The vast majority of his poetic output was thus completed before 1308 AH (1890–91 CE). In a Perisan couplet, Habib complains about life with his second wife:

حبیب اللہ گرفتارم در زنداں کلثومہ

خدا وندا رہا یم کن از زنداں کلثومہ

(transl.) Habib-al Lah (the beloved of God) lies trapped in the prison of Kulsum

God give me release me from this dungeon of Kulsum

Simultaneously, his wife sold Habib's ancestral home and resettled near her parents' house in Shamswari, Srinagar. His in-laws also stopped Habib from moving out of his home, confining him to his room. His death is described in Aush ti Aab in these words:

On the day Habib passed away, a few relatives had come to visit him. Seeing his frail condition, they understood that his time was near. They quietly left the house to purchase a kafan (funeral shroud) and other necessary items for burial.When they returned a short while later, they found that Habib had breathed his last. Though no one had been present at the exact moment of his death, they discovered that his face directed toward the qibla [Kaaba], and the bed arranged exactly according to Islamic ritual requirements [...].

== Career ==
On his return to Srinagar, Habib opened a school (madrassa) where he used to impart teachings in Persian. Habib is said to have been a strict disciplinarian. A student of his, Hakim Akbar Ali recounts his school days in these words:

Hakim saheb [Habib] used to teach us Arabic and Persian, and also impart lessons in the same languages. He would explain the meaning and context of various [difficult] words and make us take notes. Once he was lecturing on the Arabic word "Yā Sīn", and suddenly asked his students if they could recite Sura Yā Sīn. All of us remained silent with our heads held low, as none of us had memorized it. Hakim saheb told us that, 'Tomorrow all of you should have memorized it'. All the students returned home and remained awake the whole night memorizing the sura. Next day everyone in the class had memorized it. He was a strict disciplinarian.

As the son and grandson of prominent jagirdars at the Dogra court, Habib's initial life was one of ease. But, it seems that he lost a large part of his family estate. In Sehlab Nama, he alludes to this loss of jagir.

== Persian and Kashmiri Poetry ==
Barring his Kashmiri marsiya's, most of Habib's poetry was lost in fire that burnt the ancestral library of the Mulla family in December, 1922.This included a biyaz in which Habib had compiled his Persian poetry. Only a few of his masnawis, ghazals and rubai's that he wrote in Persian survive. Amongst his Kashmir poetry only two small and half complete works survive, which have been reproduced in his kulliyat.

کران چھکھ آشنائ گہہ کرانی بے وفائی

کران چھکھ دون جدائ دون کران ملہ ژار عشقو

یہ کاژا بے نیازی ژے چھے نا عار عشقو

Now you make us fellow-travellers, now you make us betray;

Now you unite two wandering hearts, now you send them separate ways.

Such careless indifference, O my cruel love!

== Flood of 1903 and Sehlab Nama ==
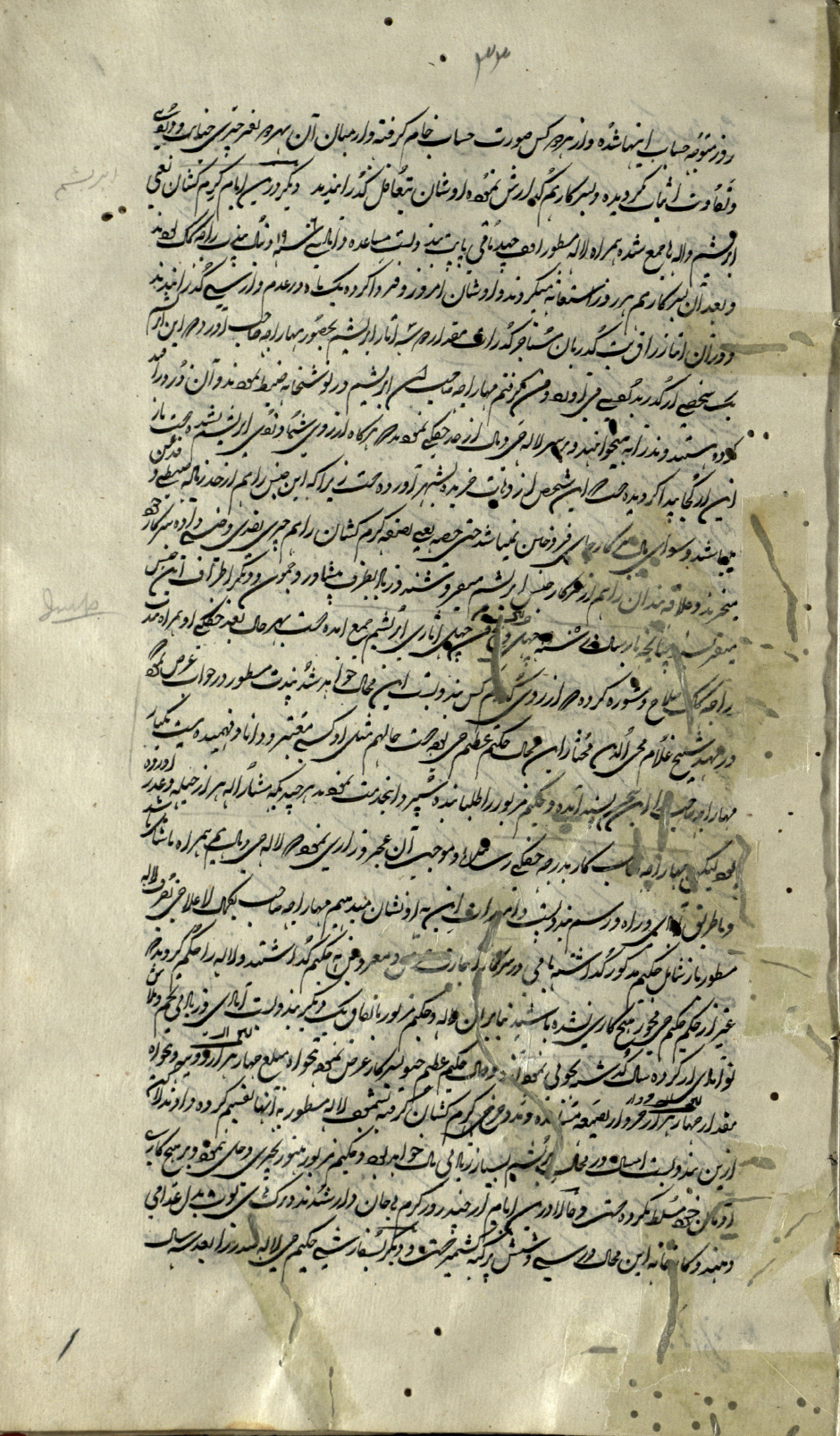
Mirza Saif's description of Habib's grandfather Azim at the Sikh court

One of the worst floods to inundate large sections of Kashmir Valley was the Great Flood of 1903, which occurred on 23–24 July 1903. The memory of this devastating flood is preserved in native Kashmiri memory through the saying 'saney shethuk selab' ('flood of the year 60'), referring to the year 1960 of the Bikrami (Hindu) calendar. Though Habib had by then abandoned poetry and embraced a life of seclusion, the catastrophe moved him deeply and inspired him to compose one of his finest Kashmiri mathnawi, a shahr-i ashob that vividly describes the devastation in the city of Srinagar. The Sehlab Nama opens with a popular refrain, that powerfully illustrates the widespread nature of the destruction :

سوکھہ موکھہ ویتھ آو آب قہار

گو کُنے کہنہ بل کھادن یار

(transl): Suddenly the Veth (Jhelum) found itself in a tempest, from Khanbal (north) to Khadinyar( south), it (Kashmir) was all one

== Habib and Kashmiri Marsiya (Kạ̄shir Marsī کٲشِر مَرثی) ==
According to the historian, Safdar Hamdani, the first marsiya Habib wrote was Khoof (Fear), خوف. Habib started writing marsiya, after his return to Srinagar. We do not know the exact date of his return, but copies of his marsiya are compiled in a biyaz written between the year 1294-1308 AH ( 1877-1890 CE)

The total number of marsiya written by Habib number fifteen . In addition he also wrote a number of shorter dirges including van, ravana, vazn-i doum and vabandh. The main marsiya written by Habib include:

Title of the Marisya
| Aab آب | Hamesha Bahar ہمیشہ بہار | Khoun خون | Shadat شہادت |
| Aatish آتش | Kar کار | Khishti کشتی | Tanour تنور |
| Chirag چراغ | Karbala کربلا | Mizan میزان | Yosuf یوسف |
| Dousti دوستی | Khoof خوف | Satoon ستون | |

== Publication ==
The first publication to include some of Habib's work is Aasun ti Gindun, a compilation of humorous and satirical works published in 1349AH (1930CE) by the Srinagar-based publishing house Ghulam Muhammad Nur Muhammad Tajiran-i Kutub. In addition to Sehlab Nama this compilation also included some of Habib's Persian poetry. This was followed by a compilation of all surviving works of Habib in Kashmiri and Persian undertaken by Anees Kazami and M Y Manzar for the Jammu & Kashmir Academy of Art, Culture and Languages which was published in 1981 as Kuliyat-i Hakim Habibullah. Earlier members of the Mulla family had published a few of Habib's Kashmiri marsiya in a two volume compilation, Kitab ul Bukah (کتاب البکا) in 1952 (vol. i) and 1978 (vol ii).

== Death ==
Habib died at the age of 53 in 1322 AH (1904 CE). He was laid to rest in his family's ancestral graveyard in Hassanabad, a predominantly Shia neighbourhood of Srinagar, in vicinity of a mosque built by his grandfather.
