= Turbah =

Ritualistic clay tablet in Shia Islam

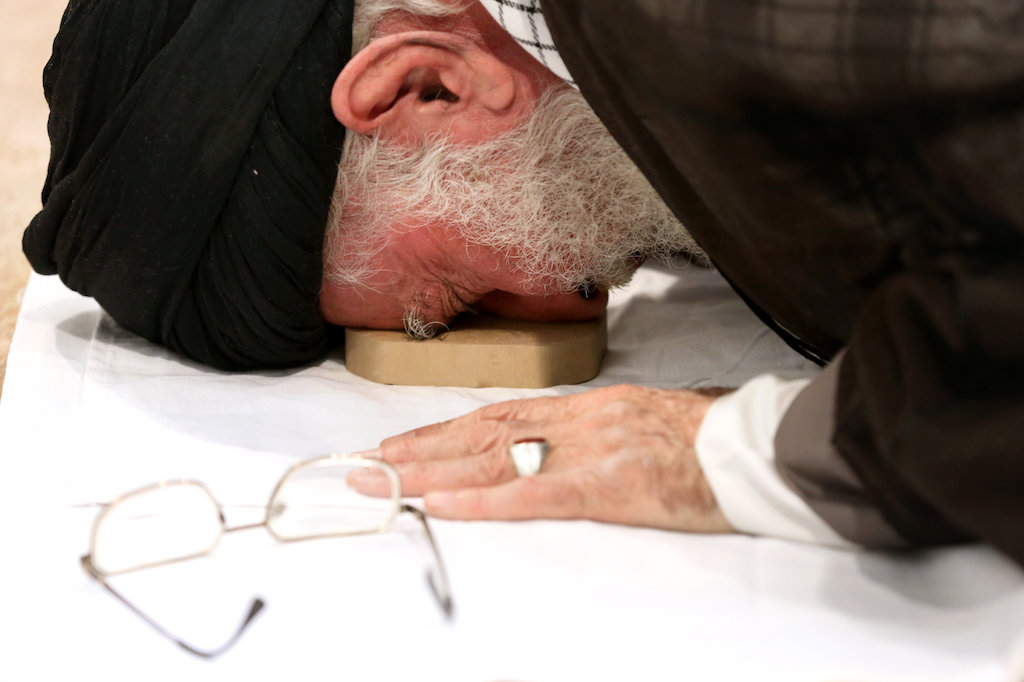
Ayatollah Ali Khamenei prays with a turbah in 2018

A turbah (Arabic: تربة, lit. 'soil'), or mohr (Persian: مهر, lit. 'seal'), also known as khāk-e shefā (Persian: خاکِ شِفا, lit. 'medicinal soil', also used in Urdu), sejde gāh (Persian: سجدہ گاہ, lit. 'place of prostration', also used in Urdu) or prayer stone, is a small piece of soil or clay, often a clay tablet, used during salah to symbolize Earth. The use of a turbah is recommended according to the Twelver branch of Shia Islam, a unique practice of the sect, and many ahadith mention the benefits of prostration upon soil or an alternative natural material. The most recommended soil is that of Karbala, the site of the martyrdom of Husayn ibn Ali; however, soil from anywhere may be used. In the absence of soil, plants or items made from these may be substituted. This provision has been extended to include paper.

Following instruction from the Quran, the Shia Imam Ja'far al-Sadiq stated that "prostration must be performed on pure earth or what grows on it, provided that it is not eaten or worn" (like leaves, wood, stone/marble so on). For example, prostration on paper is permissible because it is made of natural elements grown on earth.

== Muhammad and the use of the turbah ==
According to Abu Sa`id al-Khudri: “I saw Allah’s Apostle prostrating in mud and water and saw the mark of mud on his forehead.” Though Muhammad prayed on the ground, the hadith Sahih al-Bukhari states that Allah's Apostle also used to pray on Khumra (Arabic: خمرة), a kind of very small mat made of palm tree leaves, instead of carpet or cloth.

The idea of "absolute consideration" states that some kinds of soil, and thus some kinds of places, are better than others for prayer. For example, places, buildings, and structures related to Allah and Muhammad are held in the highest regard when it comes to places in which to hold prayer.

== Significance of Karbala ==
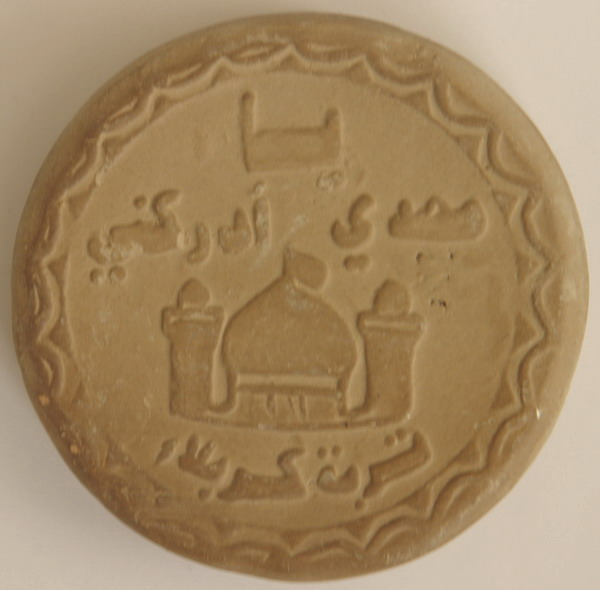
A Turbah Karbala, made from soil around Husayn ibn Ali's grave.

Karbala is especially important to Shiites because the martyrdom of Husayn ibn Ali is considered one of the major dividing lines between Muslims of the time. Husayn is important because of his relationship with Muhammad, and so the dust from Karbala is considered sacred.

To bring this revered material to others worldwide, Shi’a Muslims have made small tablets called mohr or turbah from the earth of Karbala. However, since it is an issue of honor and respect, Muslims are allowed to prostrate on other earthen materials.

== Significance and symbolism ==
A collection of turbahs at the Blue Mosque in Yerevan

Turbah (Arabic: تربة) has a primary meaning of 'dirt', 'earth' or 'soil', identified as the material Allah used to create the earth and humankind. Turbah also denotes any ground on which one prostrates oneself for prayer. Clean dirt or dust can be a substitute for someone who is performing ablutions in the absence of clean water, a practice known as tayammum.

Turbah is also found in the context of funerals because of death's association with dust, as a dead body returns to earth. Turba (or türbe in Turkish) is an Islamic funerary building in a variety of contexts.

== Sunni views ==
Many Sunnis, especially conservatives and fundamentalists, reject the use of turbah as bid’ah (Arabic: بدعة, lit. 'innovation'), noting that according to them, neither Muhammad nor his companions ever carried a clay tablet or similar item on which to place their foreheads while in prostration. They also note that many turbahs have inscribed invocations of revered Shiite figures, such as 'Ya Hussein' (Arabic: يا حسين, lit. 'O Hussein'), or 'Ya Zahra' (Arabic: يا زهرة, lit. 'O Zahra') which may be seen by them as the sin of Shirk (Arabic: شرك, lit. 'polytheism'). In Majmoo' al-Fatawa (Arabic: مجموع الفتاوى, lit. 'compilation of fatwas'), Ibn Taymiyyah, issued a fatwa that prayer on a turbah from the site of Imam Husayn's martyrdom (Karbala) is an innovation.

As a result, the turbah is highly stigmatized in most Muslim majority countries outside predominantly Shiite Iran, Azerbaijan, Bahrain, and Iraq.

== See also ==
- Türbe, an Ottoman-era mausoleum that has its etymological root in the Arabic word Turbah.
- Janamaz, Islamic prayer rug, also known as sajjadat in Arabic.
