= Sunni view of Ali =

Ali ibn Abi Talib was the cousin and son-in-law of the Islamic prophet Muhammad. Ali contributed significantly to Islam in its early years and was likely the first male to accept the teachings of Muhammad. In Sunni Islam, Ali is recognized as the fourth greatest companion, a major authority on the Quran and Islamic law, and the fountainhead of wisdom in Sunni spirituality. When Muhammad died in 632 CE, Ali had his own claims to leadership, perhaps in reference to Muhammad's announcement at the Ghadir Khumm, but he eventually accepted the temporal rule of the first three caliphs in the interest of Muslim unity. During this period, Ali is portrayed in Sunni sources as a trusted advisor of the first three caliphs, while their conflicts with Ali are neutralized or downplayed. Ali himself succeeded to the caliphate in 656 but his rule was immediately challenged by multiple pretenders and he was assassinated in 661.

As the fourth and final Rashidun caliph, Ali is held in a particularly high status in Sunni Islam, although this doctrinal reverence for Ali in Sunni Islam is a recent development for which the prominent traditionist Ahmad ibn Hanbal is likely to be credited. His hierarchy of companions places Ali below his predecessors but above those companions who fought against him, thus accommodating into Sunni doctrine the opposite sides of a moral conflict that has split the Muslim community ever since. Those prophetic sayings that elevate Ali above other companions have also been reinterpreted by Sunni scholars to uphold the Sunni hierarchy. By contrast, Shia Islam views Ali as the rightful religious and temporal successor of Muhammad and views the predecessors of Ali as usurpers of his rights.

== Background ==
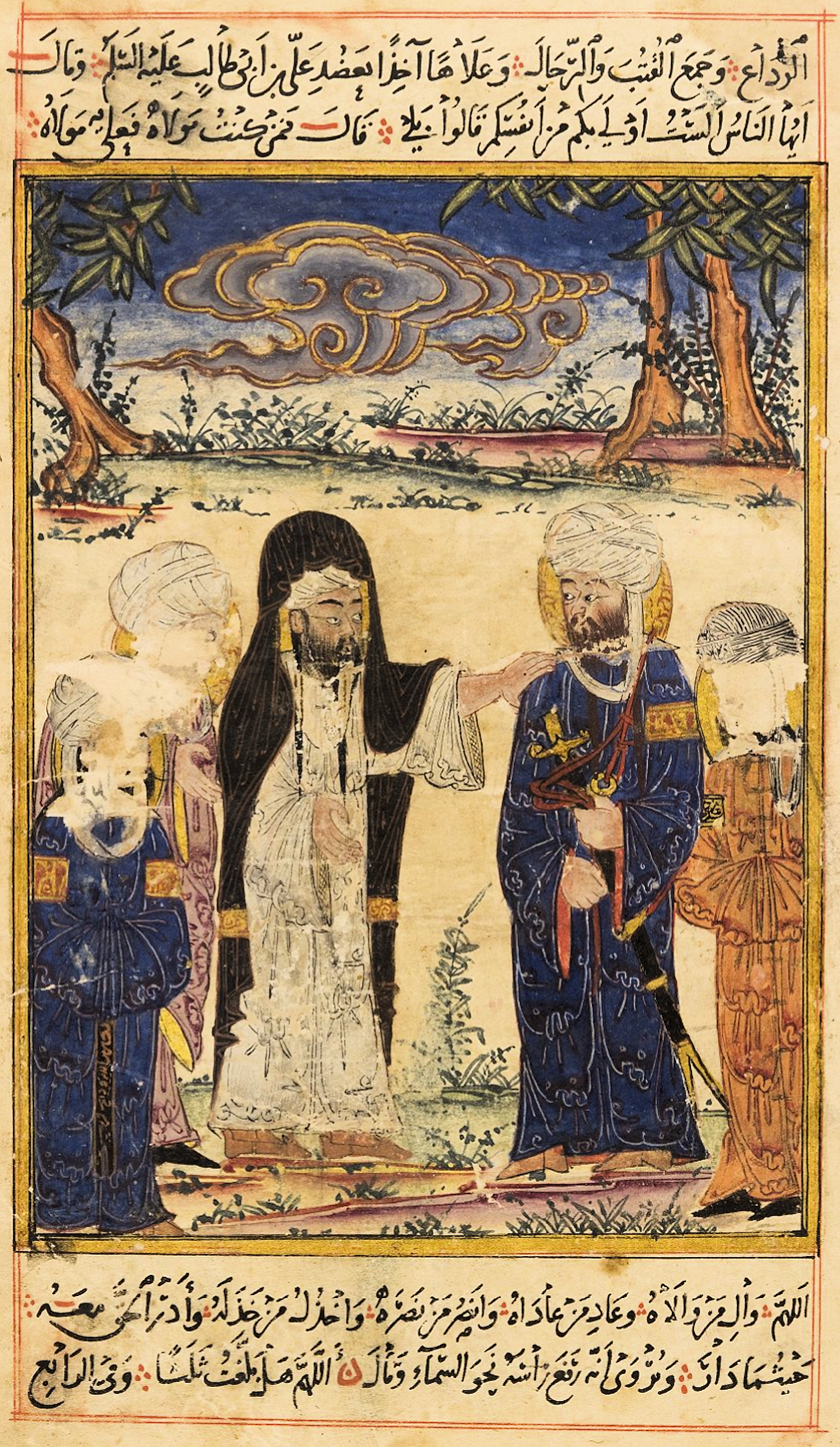
The Investiture of Ali at Ghadir Khumm in the fourteenth-century Ilkhanid copy of Chronology of Ancient Nations, illustrated by Ibn al-Kutbi

As the cousin and son-in-law of the Islamic prophet Muhammad, Ali ibn Abi Talib was likely the first male to profess Islam. He significantly contributed to Muhammad's cause inside and outside the battlefield. After his death in 632 CE, Muhammad was succeeded by Abu Bakr (r. 632–634), Umar (r. 634–644), and Uthman (r. 644–656) as caliphs of the Muslim community. Uthman was widely criticized for, among other things, nepotism towards his clan, the Umayyads. He was subsequently assassinated by rebels in 656, after which the rebels and the townspeople of Medina elected Ali as the next caliph. His rule was immediately challenged by most of the Quraysh, led by prominent companions Talha ibn Ubayd Allah and Zubayr ibn al-Awwam, and Muhammad's widow Aisha bint Abi Bakr, who refused to recognize Ali as caliph. They called for revenge against Uthman's killers and the election of a new caliph through shura (consultation). Ali emerged victorious against these early opponents at the Battle of the Camel near Basra in November 656, thereupon moving his capital to the Iraqi garrison town of Kufa.

However, Mu'awiya ibn Abi Sufyan, the long-time governor of Syria, and a member of the Umayyad clan to which Uthman belonged, also denounced Ali's legitimacy as caliph, and the two confronted each other at the Battle of Siffin. The battle ended in a stalemate in July 657 when Ali's forces stopped fighting in response to Mu'awiya's calls for arbitration. Ali reluctantly agreed to talks, but a faction of his forces, later called the Kharijites, broke away in protest, condemning his acceptance of arbitration as blasphemous. Arbitration could not settle the conflict between Mu'awiya and Ali. Ali was assassinated by the Kharijite dissident Ibn Muljam in January 661, after Ali's forces had killed most of the Kharijites at the Battle of Nahrawan. Ali's eldest son Hasan was then proclaimed caliph in Kufa, but Mu'awiya challenged his authority and invaded Iraq with his Syrian army. In August, Hasan abdicated the caliphate to Mu'awiya, who was then crowned caliph at a ceremony in Jerusalem.

== Status of Ali in Sunni Islam ==
Ali is recognized in Sunni Islam as a close companion, and Sunni sources contain numerous prophetic sayings (hadiths) in his praise. Ali had an excellent knowledge of the Quran, the central religious text of Islam, to the point that Ibn Abbas (d. c. 687), a foremost early Muslim exegete, credited all his interpretations to him. Ali is also the transmitter of hundreds of prophetic hadiths in canonical Sunni sources. Sunni Islam celebrates Ali for his dedication to the cause of Islam, for his piety, wisdom, eloquence, courage on battlefield, and magnanimity in victory. Ali is moreover the common source of mystical and spiritual currents within both Sunni and Shia sects of Islam. Pilgrimage to the shrine of Ali and praying for his intercession in the afterlife remains popular among Sunnis. However, reverence for Ali in Sunni Islam has declined in recent times with the rise of Wahhabism, a fundamentalist movement within Sunni Islam.

=== Political views ===
When Muhammad died in 632, Ali had his own claims to leadership, apparently in reference to Muhammad's announcement shortly before his death at the Ghadir Khumm. Ali thus opposed the caliphate of Abu Bakr, who was hastily elected in the absence of Ali and the rest of Muhammad's kin. Perhaps in the interest of the Muslim unity, Ali eventually accepted the temporal rule of the first three caliphs, but without giving up his claims as the designated successor of Muhammad. In particular, even though Ali may have advised Abu Bakr and Umar on government and religious matters, the conflicts between him and the first two caliphs are also well-documented, but largely downplayed in Sunni sources, in line with their tendency to neutralize the conflicts among companions. These conflicts were epitomized during the proceedings of the electoral council in 644, when Ali refused to be bound by the precedence of the first two caliphs. Ali was also critical of Uthman, and in this he was joined by most of the senior companions. In early Sunni sources, Ali is portrayed as a restraining influence on Uthman without directly opposing him. By contrast, Shia Islam views Ali as the rightful successor of Muhammad and views Ali's predecessors as usurpers of his rights.

Ali and his three predecessors are acknowledged in Sunni tradition as the Rashidun caliphs, that is, those Muslim rulers who are thought to have fulfilled the moral, religious, and judicial qualifications for a just rule. Legal decisions of Ali are thus considered binding in Sunni Islam, and sayings attributed to Ali are often cited by Sunni scholars to counter Shia positions. This acceptance of Ali, however, appears to be a late development in Sunni Islam, probably dating to the ninth century. Indeed, as far as the Umayyads were concerned, their rule began with Uthman, and Ali was a mere pretender. Similarly, many proto-Sunnis considered Uthman as the last of the Rashidun caliphs. By contrast, the Murji'a (lit. 'deferrers') deferred judgment about the early caliphs in the interest of Muslim unity. Their position was incorporated into Sunni thought by the prominent traditionist Ahmad ibn Hanbal (d. 855), who created a hierarchy of companions in which Abu Bakr, Umar, and Uthman are placed immediately above Ali, each of the four being the most meritorious person of their time. Through this hierarchy, Ali was eventually accommodated in Sunni Islam, alongside those companions who fought against him, about whom Sunnis are expected to defer judgment, lest they stoke further unrest and division in the Muslim community. The Sunni hierarchy of companions is challenged by those prophetic sayings that elevate Ali above others, including, "I am from Ali and Ali is from me," and "Whoever counts me as his patron (mawla), then Ali is his patron." These hadiths have been reinterpreted accordingly. For instance, some Sunni scholars have linked the word mawla to the financial dependence of Ali on Muhammad, who raised the former in his household as a child. Yet other Sunni authors acknowledge the religious prominence of Ali but do not consider that a basis for political succession.

=== Sunni praise for Ali ===
Umar is said to have praised Ali as the "best of judges." The Mu'tazilite scholar Ibn Abi al-Hadid (d. 1258) writes in his commentary on Nahj al-balagha that Ali corrected a ruling by Umar for a woman accused of adultery, after which the second caliph said, "Were it not for Ali, Umar would indeed have been destroyed." Similar sentiments are attributed to Umar in the Sunni Kitab al-Isti'ab and al-Bidaya wa'l-nihaya and the Shia Bihar al-anwar. Muhammad al-Shafi'i (d. 820), founder of one of the four schools of Sunni jurisprudence, commended Ali as "the best imam, the best guide," and composed a poem in his praise. In reference to the statement attributed to Ali, "Ask me about anything till I am among you," Ahmad ibn Hanbal (d. 855), founder of another Sunni school, writes that Ali was the only companion who made this claim, thus suggesting that Ali was the only companion who was qualified to make such a claim. Ibn Hanbal also commented about the caliphate of Ali, "Do you think the caliphate adorned Ali? No, rather it was Ali who adorned the caliphate."

== See also ==
- Shia view of Ali

== Sources ==
- Abbas, H. (2021). The Prophet's Heir: The Life of Ali ibn Abi Talib. Yale University Press. ISBN 9780300252057.
- Afsaruddin, A.; Nasr, S.H. (2023). "Ali". Encyclopedia Britannica.
- Amir-Moezzi, M.A (2014). "Ghadīr Khumm". In Fleet, K.; Krämer, G.; Matringe, D.; Nawas, J.; Stewart, D.J. (eds.). Encyclopaedia of Islam (Third ed.). ISBN 9789004269613.
- Anthony, S.W. (2013). "'Ali b. Abi Talib (ca. 599-661)". In Bowering, Gerhard (ed.). The Princeton encyclopedia of Islamic political thought. Princeton University Press. pp. 30–32. ISBN 9780691134840.
- Aslan, R. (2005). No god but God: The Origins and Evolution of Islam. Random House. ISBN 1588364453.
- Ayoub, M.M. (2014). The Crisis of Muslim History: Religion and Politics in Early Islam. Oneworld Publications. ISBN 9781780746746.
- Crone, P.; Hinds, M. (2003). God's Caliph: Religious Authority in the First Centuries of Islam. Cambridge University Press. ISBN 0521541115.
- Crone, P. (2005). Medieval Islamic Political Thought. Edinburgh University Press. ISBN 0748621946.
- Dakake, M.M. (2007). The Charismatic Community: Shi'ite Identity in Early Islam. State University of New York Press. ISBN 9780791470336.
- Gleave, R.M. (2008). "'Alī b. Abī Ṭālib". In Fleet, K.; Krämer, G.; Matringe, D.; Nawas, J.; Stewart, D.J. (eds.). Encyclopaedia of Islam (Third ed.). ISBN 9789004171374.
- Hinds, M. (1972). "The Murder of the Caliph 'Uthman". International Journal of Middle East Studies. 3 (4): 450–69. doi:10.1017/S0020743800025216. S2CID 159763369.
- Huart, Cl. (2012). "'Alī". In Houtsma, M.Th.; Arnold, T.W.; Basset, R.; Hartmann, R. (eds.). Encyclopaedia of Islam (First ed.). ISBN 9789004082656.
- Hulmes, E.D.A. (2008). "'Ali ibn Abi Talib". In Netton, I.R. (ed.). Encyclopedia of Islamic Civilisation and Religion. Routledge. pp. 43–45. ISBN 9780700715886.
- Jafri, S.H.M. (1979). Origins and Early Development of Shi'a Islam. Longman. ISBN 0582780802.
- Keaney, H.N. (2021). 'Uthman ibn 'Affan: Legend or Liability?. Oneworld Publications. ISBN 9781786076977.
- Lalani, A.R. (2000). Early Shī'ī Thought: The Teachings of Imam Muḥammad al-Bāqir. I.B. Tauris. ISBN 1850435928.
- Lalani, A.R. (2006). "'Ali ibn Abi Talib". In Leaman, O. (ed.). The Qur'an: An Encyclopedia. Routledge. pp. 28–32. ISBN 9780415326391.
- Louër, L. (2020). Sunnis and Shi'a: A Political History. Translated by Rundell, E. Princeton University Press. ISBN 9780691186610.
- Lucas, S.C. (2004). Constructive Critics, Ḥadīth Literature, and the Articulation of Sunnī Islam: The Legacy of the Generation of Ibn Saʻd, Ibn Maʻīn, and Ibn Ḥanbal. Brill. ISBN 9789004133198.
- Madelung, W. (1997). The Succession to Muhammad: A Study of the Early Caliphate. Cambridge University Press. ISBN 9780521561815.
- Mavani, H. (2013). Religious Authority and Political Thought in Twelver Shi'ism: From Ali to Post-Khomeini. Routledge. ISBN 9780203694282.
- Momen, M. (1985). An Introduction to Shi'i Islam. Yale University Press. ISBN 9780300035315.
- Poonawala, I.K. (1982). "'Alī b. Abī Ṭāleb I. Life". Encyclopaedia Iranica (Online ed.).
- Rauf, F.A. (2007). "What is Sunni Islam?". In Cornell, V.J. (ed.). Voices of Islam. Vol. 1. Praeger. pp. 185–216. ISBN 0275987337.
- Shah-Kazemi, R. (2007). Justice and Remembrance: Introducing the Spirituality of Imam 'Ali. I.B. Tauris. ISBN 9781845115265.
- Shah-Kazemi, R. (2014). "'Ali ibn Abi Talib". In Fitzpatrick, C.; Walker, A.H. (eds.). Muhammad in History, Thought, and Culture: An Encyclopaedia of the Prophet of God. Vol. 1. ABC-CLIO. pp. 182–187. ISBN 9781610691772.
- Shah-Kazemi, R. (2015). "Imam Ali". In Daftary, F.; Sajoo, A.B.; Jiwa, S. (eds.). The Shi'i World: Pathways in Tradition and Modernity. I.B. Tauris. pp. 33–55. ISBN 9781784534776.
- Shah-Kazemi, R. (2019). Imam 'Ali: From Concise History to Timeless Mystery. Matheson Trust. ISBN 9781908092182.
- Soufi, D.L. (1997). The Image of Fatima in Classical Muslim Thought (PhD thesis). Princeton University. ProQuest 304390529.
- Tabatabai, S.M.H. (1975). Shi'ite Islam. Translated by Nasr, S.H. State University of New York Press. ISBN 0873953908.
- Veccia Vaglieri, L. (1970). "The Patriarchal and Umayyad Caliphates". In Holt, P.M.; Lambton, A.K.S.; Lewis, B. (eds.). The Cambridge History of Islam. Vol. 1. Cambridge University Press. pp. 57–103. [ISBN unspecified]
- Veccia Vaglieri, L. (2012a). "'Alī b. Abī Ṭālib". In Bearman, P.; Bianquis, Th.; Bosworth, C.E.; van Donzel, E.; Heinrichs, W.P. (eds.). Encyclopaedia of Islam (Second ed.). ISBN 9789004161214.
- Veccia Vaglieri, L. (2012b). "G̲h̲adīr K̲h̲umm". In Bearman, P.; Bianquis, Th.; Bosworth, C.E.; van Donzel, E.; Heinrichs, W.P. (eds.). Encyclopaedia of Islam (Second ed.). ISBN 9789004161214.
