= Syed Saleh (Haigam) =

17th century Kashmiri author

Syed Saleh Rizvi (or Syed Salih Ridwi) was a Kashmiri scholar and writer of the 17th to 18th centuries.

== Biography ==
Syed Saleh Rizvi lived during the 17th and 18th centuries. He resided in Ahmedpore village, two to three miles from the town of Magam in Kashmir. Later Syed Saleh went to live in the village of Haigam in the Baramulla district in Kashmir.

== Works ==
Rizvi was a prominent scholar of his period, who wrote a Marsiyeh or dirge in Kashmiri in the memory of Imam Hussein, the Shiite third Imam who was killed in the Battle of Karbala.

== Grave and descendants ==
Syed Saleh is reportedly buried in Kabul, Afghanistan. His grandson, Aqa Syed Safdar Rizvi went to Lucknow along with his son Aqa Syed Ali, known as Aqa Syed Ali Rizvi Kashmiri. Aqa Syed Ali was educated in Najaf and Karbala in Iraq and was a leading intellectual, an Ayatollah and a renowned jurist, whose son Ayatollah Syed Abul Hassan Rizvi Kashmiri (Abbu Sahab) is credited as having established a well known Shiite Islamic school, Sultanul Madaris, and also helped in establishing the school of Jamia Nazimeyeh, both in Lucknow. This Aqa Syed Ali Kashmiri was also the maternal grandfather of the Gnostic and jurist, Ayatollah Syed Murtazha Rizvi Kashmiri. Among his other descendants was the Islamic jurist Ayatullah Syed Ahmed Rizvi Kashmiri (1901-1964), who lived in Srinagar City of Kashmir. Many of his descendants are buried in Karbala and Najaf.
