= Turbah Karbala =

Soil taken from Husayn ibn Ali's grave in Karbala

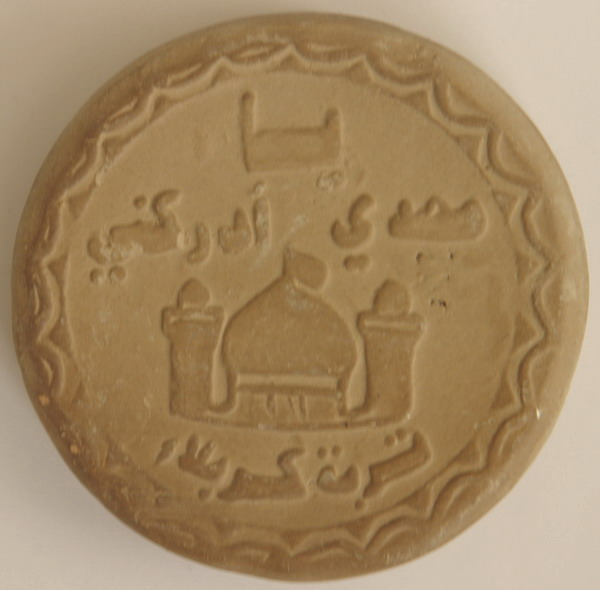
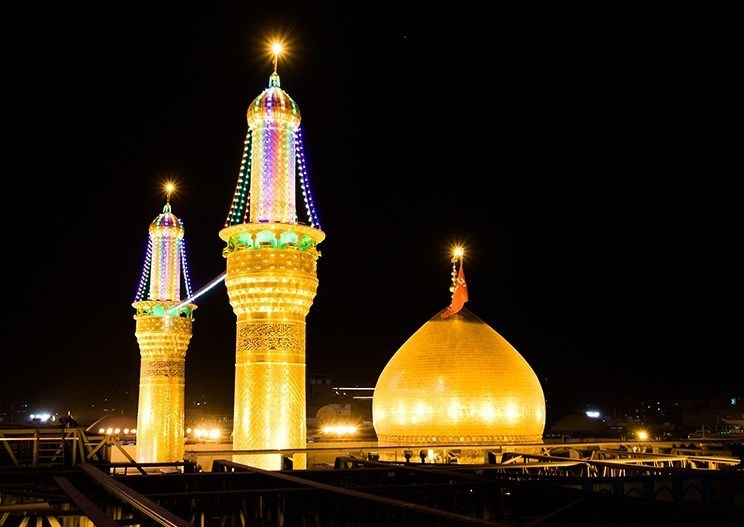
Left: Turbah Karbala made from the soil of Husayn ibn Ali's grave. Right: Shrine of Husayn ibn Ali, Karbala, Iraq.

Turbah Karbala (Arabic: تربة کربلاء, lit. 'Soil of Karbala'), or Khāk-e Shifā (Lisan al-Dawat, Persian, and Urdu: خاکِ شِفاء, lit. 'Medicinal Soil'), or "Turbah of Imam Hussain" is the soil taken from Hussain ibn Ali's grave in the city of Karbala. Shia Muslims use it to make turbah and misbaha.

== Background ==
According to Islamic (Shi'i) narrations, "Turbah Karbala" has diverse effects, and prostrating on it is considered as a Mustahab (recommended) practice during the time of prayer(s). The sixth Imam of Shia Islam, Ja'far al-Sadiq named this soil as affairs trouble-shooter.

Turbah which means soil, grave, tomb, etc., is regarded (as a probability) as every soil around each holy grave(s) among the Islamic prophet Muhammad, The Twelve Imams and Imamzadehs; but exclusively it is attributed to the soil of Hussain ibn Ali's grave, and the phrases "Tin-al-Qabr" or "al-Tin" are considered as it according to the hadiths of Shia Imams.

"Turbah Karbala" has various influences, amongst:

- (Divine) reward for the reciter of Dhikr (who keep this turbah in his/her hand)
- High spiritual effects on human (by touching it to the body)
- Safety against calamities, and every fear
- Safety for children (newborns)
- Healing

== See also ==
- Tasbih of Fatimah
- Dhikrullah
- Tasbih
- Durood
- Salat
- Dua
- Baetylus
