= Shia view of Ali =

Status of Ali in Shia Islam

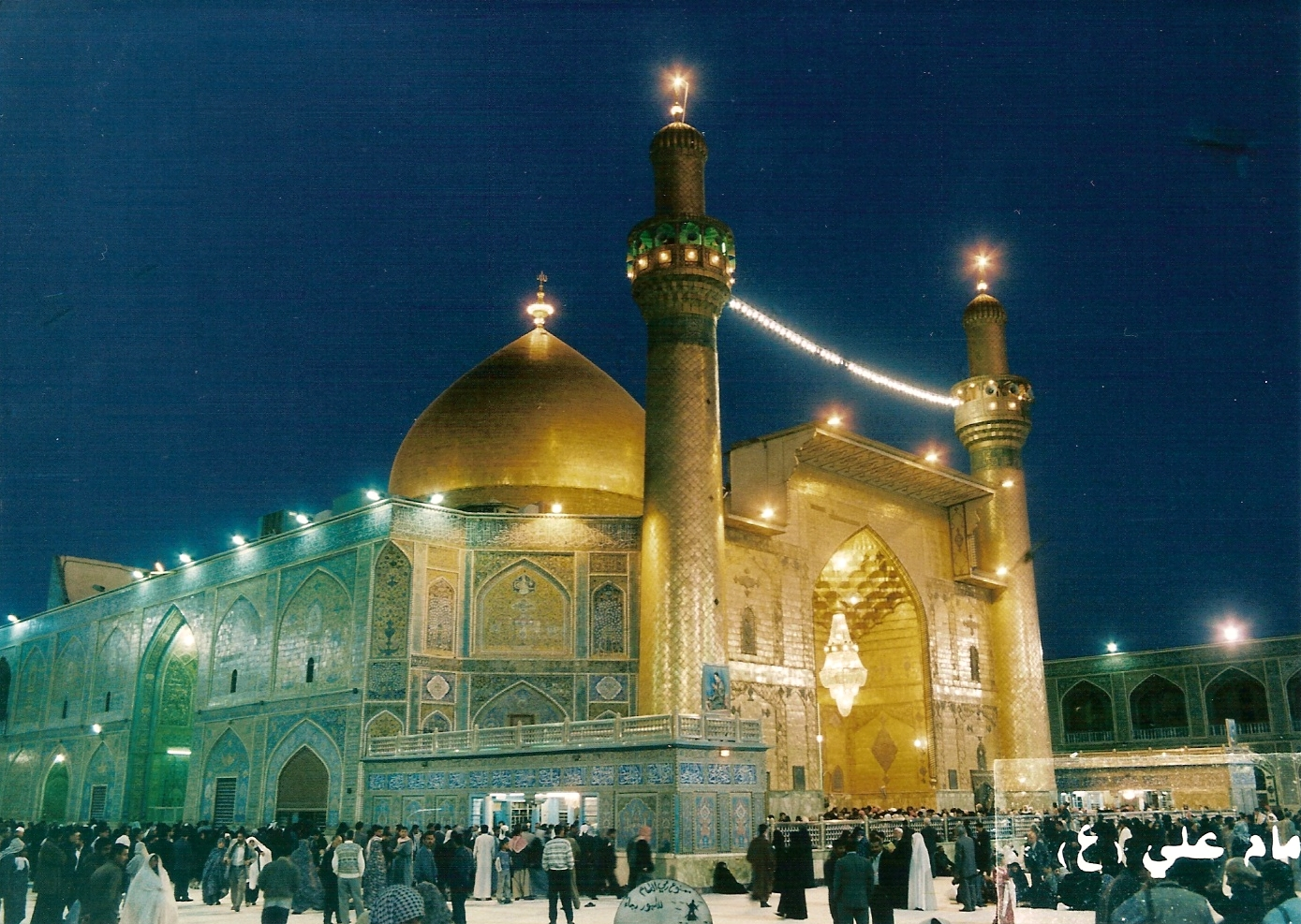
Shrine of Ali in Najaf, Iraq

Ali ibn Abi Talib was the cousin and son-in-law of the Islamic prophet Muhammad. Ali contributed significantly to Islam in its early years and was likely the first male to accept the teachings of Muhammad. In Shia Islam, Ali is regarded as the foremost companion of Muhammad and his rightful successor through divinely-ordained designation at the Ghadir Khumm. Ali is accorded an almost legendary place in Islam, as a paragon of virtues, a fount of wisdom, and a fearless, magnanimous warrior.

When Muhammad died in 632 CE, Ali had his own claims to leadership but eventually accepted the temporal rule of the first three caliphs in the interest of Muslim unity. The three caliphs are viewed in Shia Islam as illegitimate rulers and usurpers of Ali's rights. Ali himself succeeded to the caliphate in 656 but his rule was immediately challenged by multiple pretenders and he was assassinated in 661.

In Shia belief, Ali inherited Muhammad's political and religious authority, even before his ascension to the caliphate in 656. In Shia theology, Ali also inherited the esoteric knowledge of Muhammad. Ali is thus viewed, after Muhammad, as the sole authoritative source of (esoteric) guidance and the interpreter, par excellence, of the Quran, the central religious text of Islam. Shia Muslims also believe that Ali, as with Muhammad, was divinely protected from sins. Ali's words and deeds are therefore considered a model for the Shia community and a source for their religious injunctions.

== Background ==
As the cousin and son-in-law of the Islamic prophet Muhammad, Ali ibn Abi Talib was likely the first male to profess Islam. He significantly contributed to Muhammad's cause inside and outside the battlefield. After he died in 632 CE, Muhammad was succeeded by Abu Bakr (r. 632–634), Umar (r. 634–644), and Uthman (r. 644–656) in the capacity of caliphs. Uthman was widely accused, among other things, of nepotism towards his clan, the Umayyads. He was subsequently assassinated in 656, after which Ali was elected caliph in Medina. His rule was immediately challenged by Talha ibn 'Ubayd Allah and Zubayr ibn al-Awwam, who aspired to the caliphate, and by Muhammad's widow Aisha bint Abu Bakr. Their rebellion was suppressed in the Battle of the Camel in 656. Still, the 657 Battle of Siffin with another pretender, Mu'awiya ibn Abu Sufyan, ended in stalemate and the formation of the Kharijites (lit. 'the seceders'), who seceded from Ali's army. A member of the Kharijites is thought to be responsible for the assassination of Ali in 661, which paved the way for Mu'awiya, who took over the caliphate in 661 and found the dynastic Umayyad Caliphate.

== Status of Ali in Shia Islam ==
Ali is accorded an almost legendary place in Islam as a paragon of virtues, a fount of wisdom, and a fearless but magnanimous warrior. But it is in Shia Islam that Ali takes center stage, for the Arabic word shi'a itself is short for shi'a of Ali (lit. 'followers of Ali'), his name is incorporated into the daily Twelver Shia call to prayer (adhan), and he is regarded as the foremost companion of Muhammad. The defining doctrine of Shia Islam is that Ali was the rightful successor of Muhammad through divinely-ordained designation, which is primarily a reference to Muhammad's announcement shortly before his death at the Ghadir Khumm. By contrast, Sunni Muslims interpret this announcement differently, and believe that Muhammad did not designate a successor. With the exception of some Zaydi Shias, the Shia community has therefore considered Ali's predecessors as illegitimate rulers and usurpers of Ali's rights. Historically, shi'a of Ali already existed during the lifetime of Muhammad as a religious movement, but Shia Islam as a distinct set was galvanized through political events, such as the crisis of succession to Muhammad, the assassination of Uthman, and the massacre of Ali's descendants in the Battle of Karbala.

In Shia belief, Ali inherited the political and religious authority of Muhammad, even before his ascension to the caliphate in 656. This all-encompassing bond of loyalty between Shia Muslims and their imams (and Muhammad in his capacity as imam) is known as walaya. Shia Muslims also believe that Ali is endowed with the privilege of intercession on the Judgment Day, citing, for instance, the Quranic passage, "There is no one that can intercede with Him, unless He has given permission." The shrine of Ali in Najaf, present-day Iraq, is among the most sacred sites for the Shia. Some of the Ghulat (lit. 'exaggerators'), such as the Nusayrites, attributed divinity to Ali. Extreme views like this were largely rooted out of Shi'ism through the efforts of Ali's successors. A report in al-Saduq's Uyoun Akhbar Al-Ridha attributes to Ali al-Rida an explicit rejection of attributing either divinity or prophethood to the Imams.

=== Esoteric knowledge ===
In Shia belief, Ali also inherited the esoteric knowledge of Muhammad, for instance, according to the prophetic hadith, "I [Muhammad] am the city of knowledge, and Ali is its gate." Ali is thus viewed, after Muhammad, as the interpreter, par excellence, of the Quran, the central religious text of Islam. After Muhammad, Ali is also considered the sole authoritative source of (esoteric) guidance in Shia Islam. Unlike Muhammad, however, Ali is not thought to have received divine revelation (wahy), though he might have been guided by divine inspiration (ilham). Verse 21:73 of the Quran is cited here, among others, "We made them imams, guiding by Our command, and We revealed (awhayna') to them the performance of good deeds, the maintenance of prayers, and the giving of zakat (alms), and they used to worship Us." Shia Muslims also believe in the infallibility (isma) of Ali, as with Muhammad, that is, their divine protection from sins. Here the verse of purification is cited, among others. Ali's words and deeds are therefore considered a model for the Shia community and a source for their religious injunctions. Most Shia theologians accept that Ali did not inherently possess the knowledge of the unseen (ilm al-ghayb), but occasionally had access to its glimpses. Ali is moreover the common source of mystical and spiritual currents within both Shia and Sunni sects of Islam.

== See also ==
- Imamate and guardianship of Ali
- Sunni view of Ali
