= Sughra Humayun Mirza =

Indian social reformer and writer

Sughra Humayun Mirza (1884 – 1958), also known as Begum Sughra, was a social reformer, Urdu writer and traveller from Hyderabad, India. She is known as one of the founding figures of women's writing in Urdu and believed to be Hyderabad's first female novelist, having written 14 major novels.

== Early life and education ==
Mirza was born in December 1884 in the erstwhile princely state of Hyderabad, India. She came from an educated, migrant, Shia Muslim family who had settled in Hyderabad and served the state. Her father, Safdar Ali Mirza, served as a surgeon in the Nizam's Army. Her mother, Maria Begum, was a scholar of Arabic and Persian languages. Her grandfather was from Turkey, and her maternal family was from Iran.

Sughra was homeschooled in Urdu and Persian. At the age of 16, she married Humayun Mirza, a prosperous barrister from Patna, who moved to Hyderabad.

== Career ==
=== Literary work ===
Mirza was a prominent Urdu language writer of her time and wrote travel accounts, novels, short stories, poetry, and essays. Her writings reflected her views on social reform and, particularly, advocating for women's rights.

She is considered to be the first woman novelist in Urdu from Hyderabad. She authored major 14 novels, including Mohini (1929), Zohra (1911), Bibi Turi ka Khwab (Turi's Dream), Awaz-e-Ghaib (Voice from the Unknown), Sarguzisht-e-Hajira (1926) and Safina-e-Najat (The Barge of Liberation). She wrote poetry under the pen name 'Haya'.

She contributed to several women's magazines and served as editor Al-Nisa (The Woman), and Zaib-un-Nisa (Women's Adornment). Al-Nisa was published between 1919 and 1927 and focused on social issues like cleanliness, health, nursing, and critiques of outdated customs. It became a platform for women writers and had an audience beyond Hyderabad, including in cities such as Aligarh, Delhi, Lahore and Lucknow.

In 1934, she started another magazine called Zaib-un-Nisa after moving to Lahore which ran through the 1930s and 1940s. Unlike in Hyderabad, where she "had to do all the work of editing herself", Mirza had access to better publishing facilities and editorial support in Lahore. The magazine had greater political content as compared to Al-Nisa and documented significant events such as meetings of the All India Women's Conference and the Women's Muslim League.

Mirza authored five book length travelogues, three of which documented her travels within India during 1914 and 1918, and two documented her journeys abroad to Iraq in 1915 and through Europe in 1924. Her domestic accounts emphasized more on reformist activities and social engagement, while her international narratives offered more observations on the countries she visited, while also discussing social issues. In her travelogue about her journey through England, France, Germany and Switzerland titled 'Safarnamah-i Yurap', she wrote about meeting Abdulmejid II, the last Ottoman caliph, during his exile on the shores of Lake Geneva. By her own account, she was the first Indian woman to meet with the Ottoman leader and his wife during their exile.

=== Reform ===
Mirza's reform work focused on women's empowerment through education and challenging societal norms that restricted their participation in public life. She opposed the oppression of women and the imposition of purdah, supporting measures such as the rehabilitation of women in abusive marriages, their right to divorce, and widow remarriage. She highlighted the strictness of pardah practice in India and, in her later years, and began addressing public gatherings without a veil.

In 1913, she became the secretary of the Anjuman-e-Khawatin-e-Islam (Association for Muslim Women), contributing to the organization's efforts toward improving the status of Muslim women. In 1919, she established the Anjuman-e-Khawateen-e-Dakkan (Deccan Ladies' Association). These organizations became platforms for discussing issues related to girls' education, teaching trades and crafts, fundraising for educational initiatives, and arranging sports activities for women.

In 1934, she founded the Madrasa-e-Safdaria, an Urdu-medium girls school for Muslim girls named after her father. She dedicated a portion of her own property to the institution. It continues to operate under the name 'Safdariya Girls High School'.

Beyond her work in education and social reform, she contributed to nationalist efforts by promoting communal harmony through her writings and advocating for the use of swadeshi goods. She was also involved with the Hindu Women's Association as its only non-Hindu member.

== Death ==
Mirza died in 1958. She is buried along with her husband in a tomb next to Safdariya Girls High School which she had established.
