= Salar Jung Museum =

Art Museum in Hyderabad, Telangana, India

Coordinates: 17.371426°N 78.480347°E

- Infobox
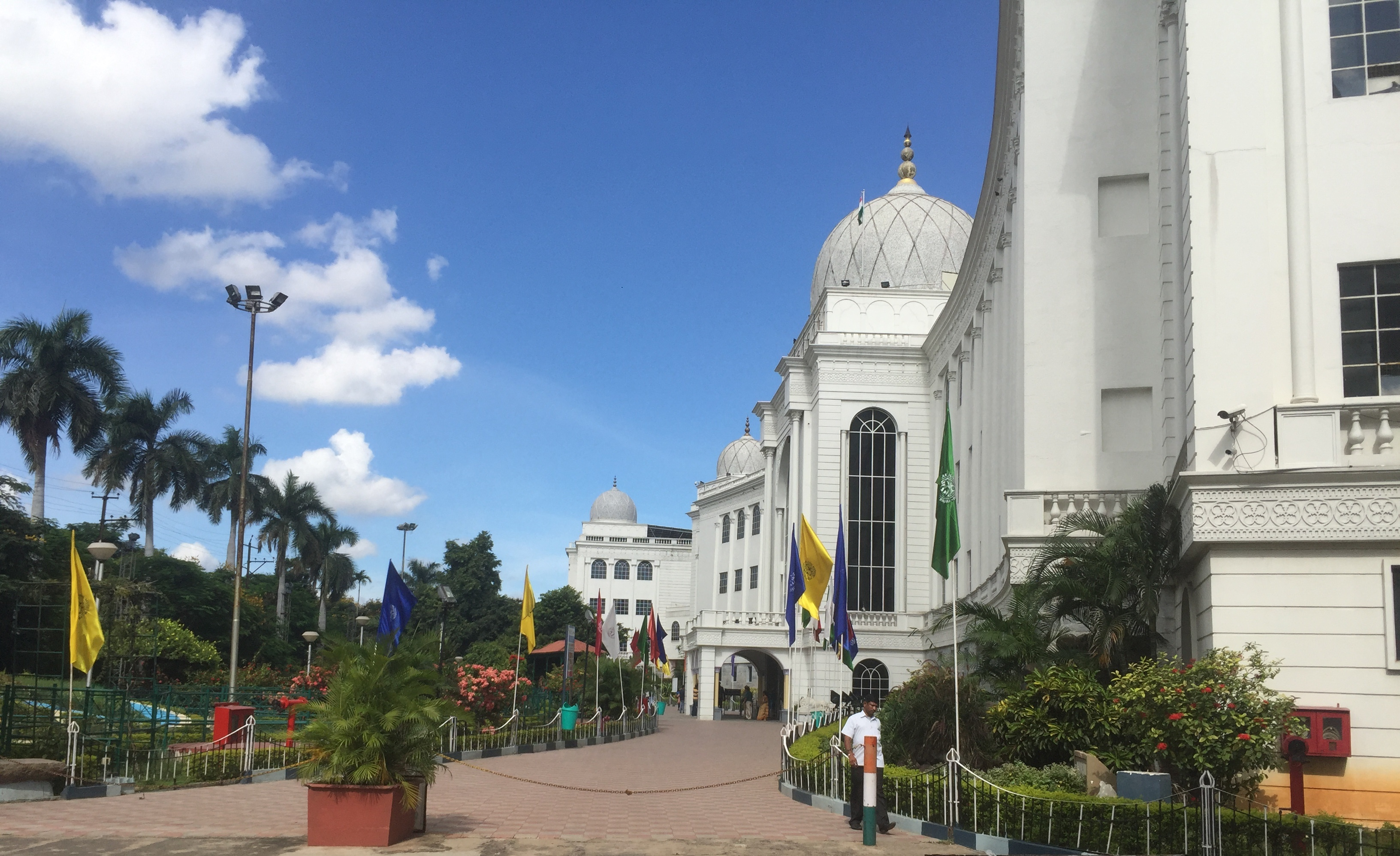
- The Salar Jung Museum building
- Established: 16 December 1951; 74 years ago
- Location: Dar-ul-Shifa, Hyderabad, Telangana, India
- Type: Art Museum
- Key holdings: Veiled Rebecca
- Collection size: 1.1 million objects
- Owner: Government of India
- Website: www.salarjungmuseum.in

The Salar Jung Museum is an art museum located at Dar-ul-Shifa, on the southern bank of the Musi River in the city of Hyderabad, Telangana, India. It is one of the notable National Museums of India. Originally a private art collection of the Salar Jung family, it was endowed to the nation after the death of Salar Jung III. It was inaugurated on 16 December 1951.

It has a collection of sculptures, paintings, carvings, textiles, manuscripts, ceramics, metallic artefacts, carpets, clocks, and furniture from Japan, China, Burma, Nepal, India, Persia, Egypt, Europe, and North America.

== History ==
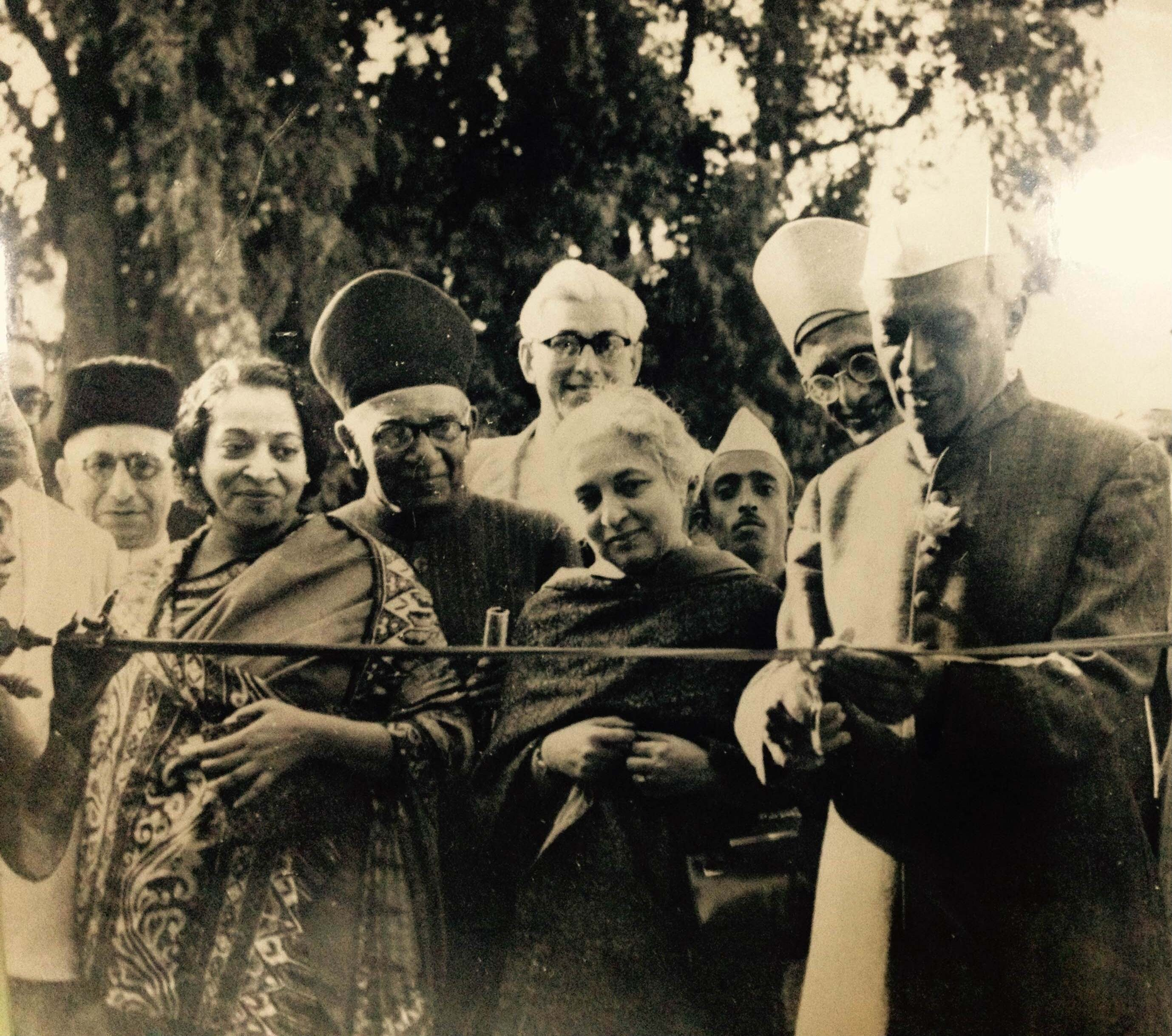
Inauguration of the Salar Jung Museum by Prime Minister Jawaharlal Nehru, c. 1951

A nobleman of the Salar Jung family of Hyderabad, Nawab Mir Yousuf Ali Khan, Salar Jung III (1889–1949) served as Prime Minister of Hyderabad during the Nizam's rule in Hyderabad state. He spent a substantial amount of his income, over a period of thirty-five years, collecting artefacts from all across the world.

After the Nawab died in 1949, the collections were left behind in his ancestral palace Diwan Devdi. The collection was formerly exhibited there as a private museum named the Salar Jung Museum, which was inaugurated by Jawaharlal Nehru on 16 December 1951.

Old timers believe that the present collection constitutes only half of the original art wealth collected by the Nawab. His employees siphoned off part of it, since the Nawab depended upon his staff to keep a vigil.

The state decided to shift the museum to a new building and after a design competition, Mohammed Fayazuddin was selected as the architect of the new building.

The foundation stone was laid by Jawaharlal Nehru in 1963, and in 1968, the museum shifted to its present location at Dar-ul-Shifa, and is administered by a board of trustees with the governor of Telangana as ex officio chairperson under the Salar Jung Museum Act of 1961. Some more art pieces were lost or stolen during the shifting of the museum from Dewan Devdi to the present site.

In 2003, the museum signed a memorandum of understanding with the National Mission for Manuscripts, and was declared a manuscript conservation centre.

In 2006, a fire broke out in an auditorium on the museum premises. However, it was quickly extinguished and none of the artefacts were damaged. After the incident, fire safety facilities were upgraded.

== Collections ==
Collection at the Salar Jung Museum can be broadly classified into Indian Art, Middle Eastern Art, Far Eastern Art, European Art and Children's Section. Other than this a founder gallery is created which is dedicated to Salar Jung Family.

=== Indian Art ===
Indian Collection can be categorised into following galleries Indian Bronze, Indian Textile, Indian Sculpture, Minor arts of South India, Miniature Paintings, Ivory Carvings arms and armour, Metal Ware and Jade Carving.

==== Indian Miniature Painting ====
The history of miniature painting can be traced to 14th century. Before the invention of paper, the art was practised on cloth or certain kinds of leaves. The museum houses manuscripts on leaves from 15th- and 16th-century Gujrat. It holds a range of miniature paintings from Mughal, Rajasthani, Thanjavur, Malwa and Deccan schools.

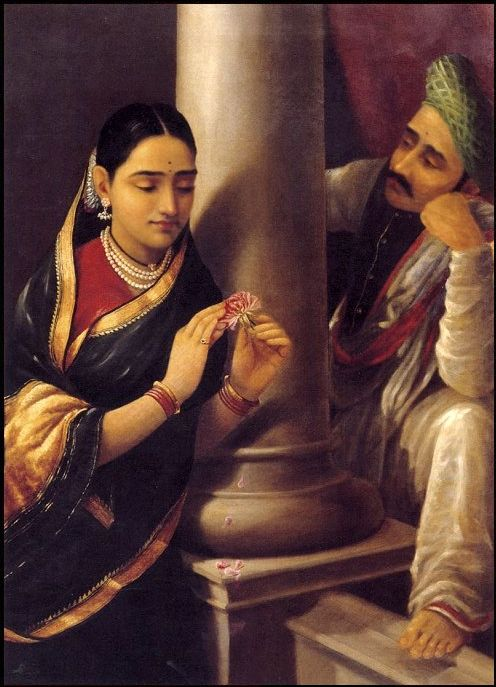
Stolen Interview by Raja Ravi Varma

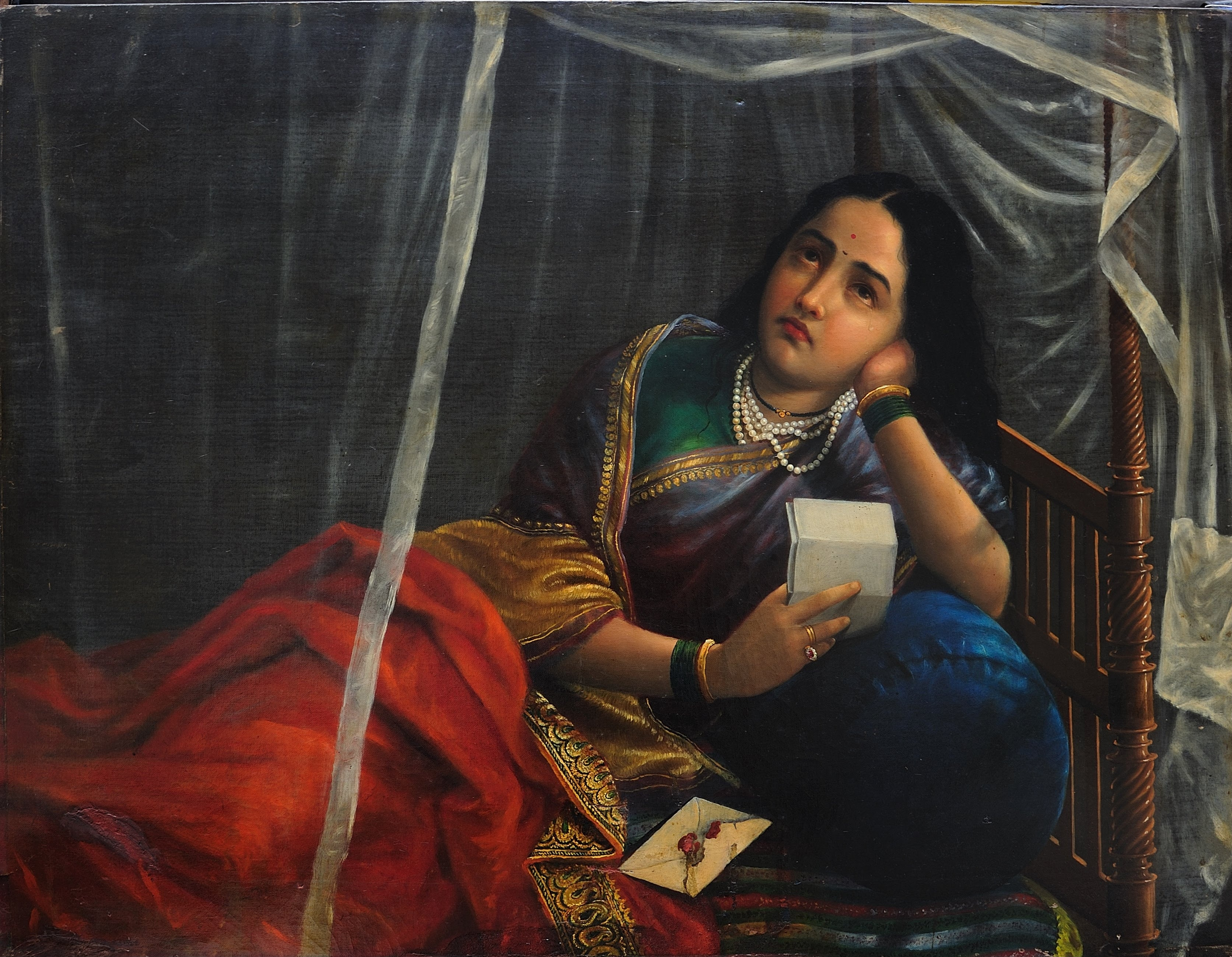
Disappointing News by Raja Ravi Varma

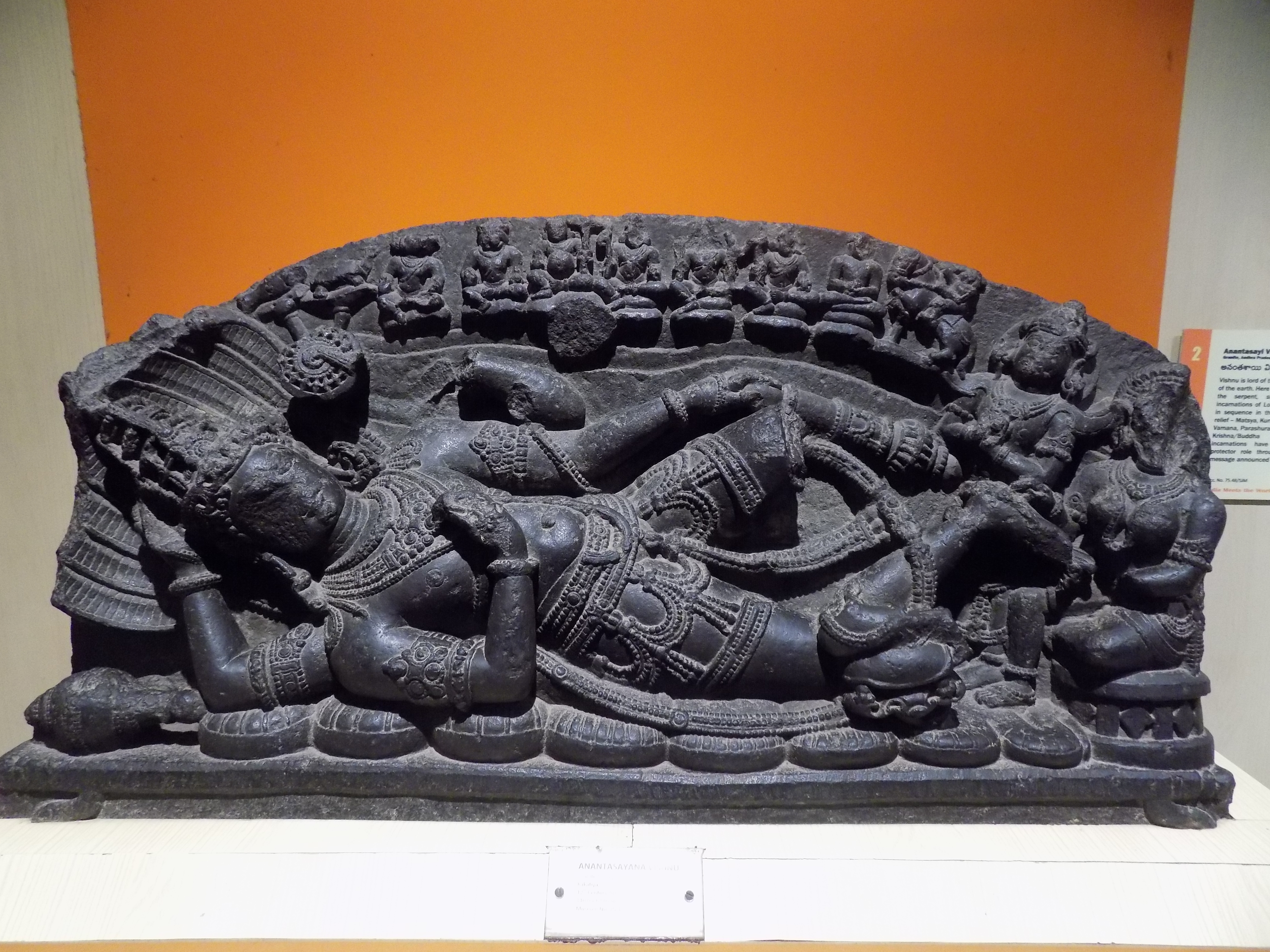
Anantashayana Vishnu in granite, from the Chola period, 11th century CE

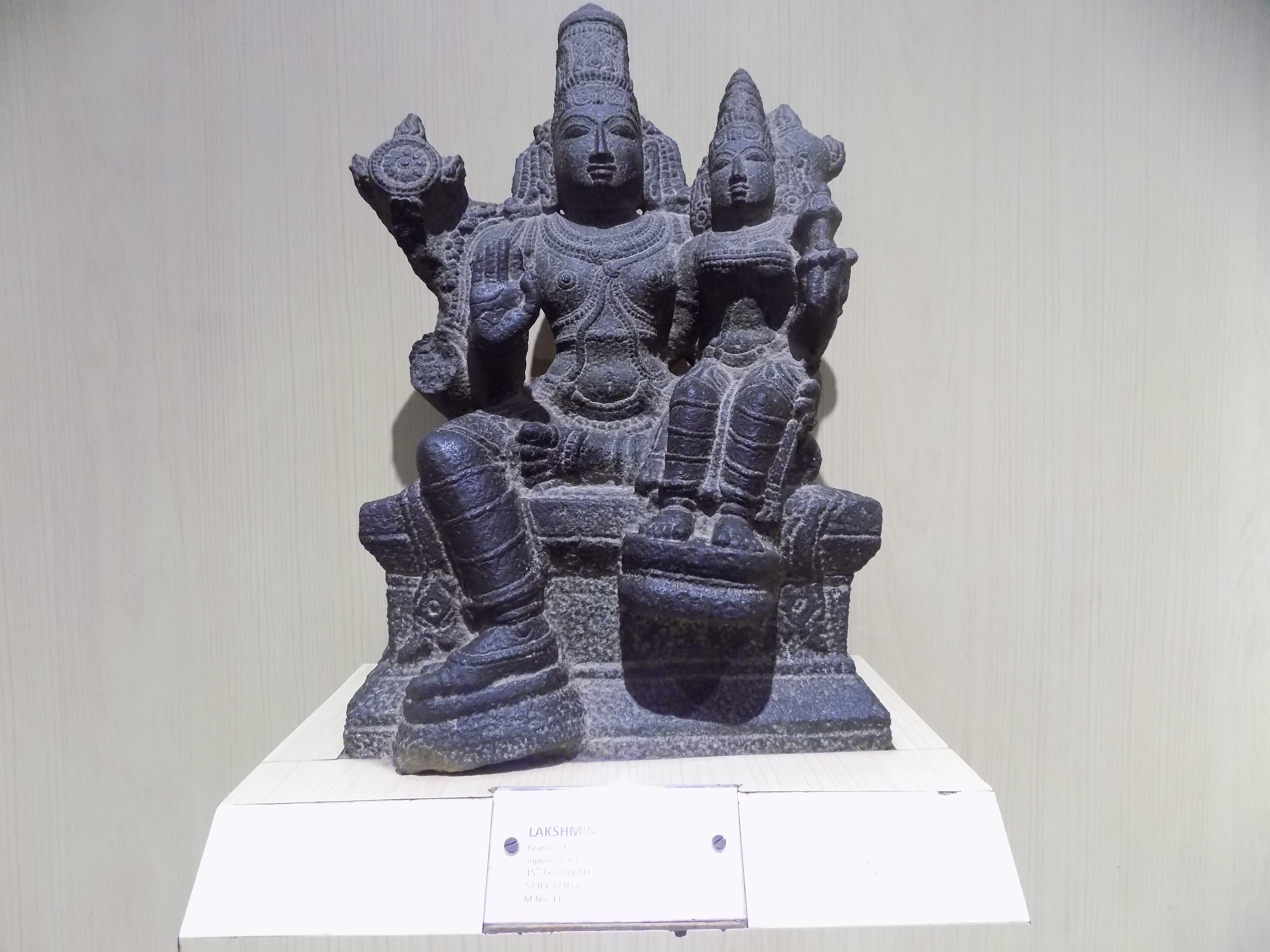
Lakshmi Narayan in granite, from the Vijayanagara period, 15th century CE

Indian collections of the museum

Notable works of miniature painting are:

- The Birth of the Prince, which captures the spirit of a significant event and depicts both Persian and Indian influence
- From the Mughal school, showing European influence is Madonna with Child, from the 16th century
- An important painting from the Mughal school of the 17th century is Prince with a Hawk. This is among the earliest of Mughal artistic works that depict facial features of Persians
- A Mughal miniature painting which shows the style in full bloom is King with Nobles

The Deccan school with centres at Golconda, Bijapur, Bidar, Gulbarga and Ahmednagar, also produced some fine pieces of miniature painting which were strongly influenced by Mughal and Persian miniature-painting styles. Some noteworthy examples of both paintings and manuscripts in the museum: Bhog Bal, dated from 16th century, is one of the most prominent of the manuscripts; a painting showing Jamshed Quli and Ibrahim Quli in conversation is a good example of Golconda School; an interesting painting from Bijapur School is Elephants in a Fight. There are several paintings of Yoginis and from Ragamala.

==== Modern Painting ====
Salar Jung III hand acquired few Modern Paintings but majority of the paintings in collection were collected by the museum in 1962. In India Ravi Verma was the pioneer of the Modern School, he worked with oil medium depicting Indian mythology and classic themes. The museum has two of his works, Stolen Interview and The Kerela Beauty. Other masters of the Modern School whose works are presented in the museum are Varma and Abdur Rahman Chughtai, M. F. Husain, K.K. Hebbar, Rabindranath Tagore, Abanidranath Tagore Chugtai and Nandalal Bose

==== Ivory Carving ====
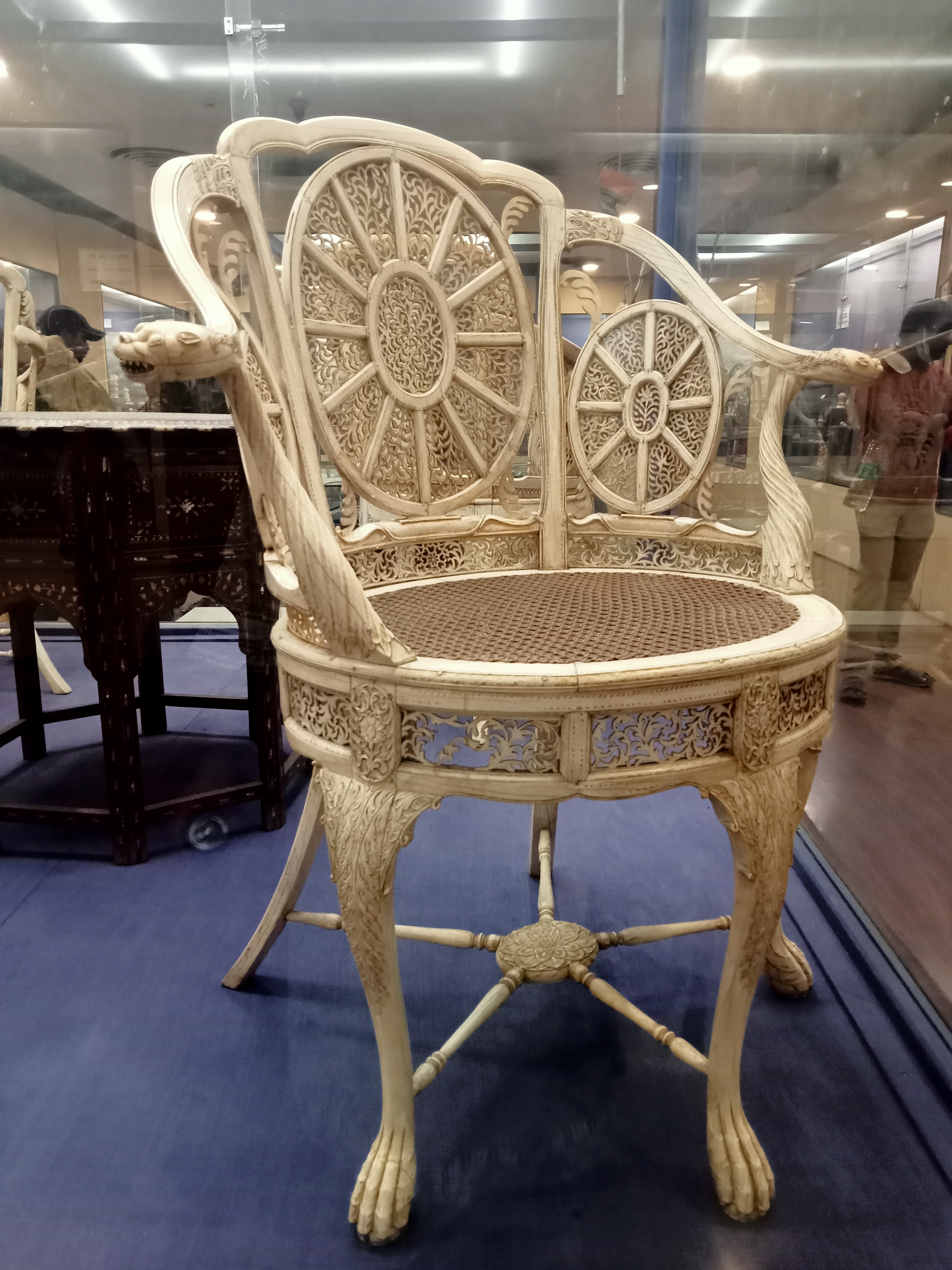
Ivory Chair gifted to Tipu Sultan by Louis XVI of France

The Museum contains important examples of ivory carvings in different forms, such as furniture, mats, lamps, handles of daggers, chess and chausars. The chessman and chausar are interesting elements, the pawns being depicted as soldiers, while the king and queen are riding on elephants. These painted pieces belong to North India.

The most notable element is the ivory carved chair gifted to Tipu Sultan by Louis XVI. The backrest of the chair is a fine lattice pattern and the armrest is carved as a lion head. Ivory lamp also deserves a special mention owing to its intricate craftsmanship and is the only ivory carving example from Mysore.

The "Founder's Gallery" houses portraits of Salar Jung III, as well as other members of the Salar Jung family.

The Indian block includes jade-crafted daggers of Jahangir, Nur Jahan and Shah Jahan; and weapons belonging to Aurangzeb, Tipu Sultan, Muhammad Shah, Bahadur Shah and Abul Hasan Qutb Shah.

Indian sculptures from the Gandhara and Chola periods are also displayed.

==== Jade Collection ====
Salarjung Museum's Jade Collection is one of the largest collection of jade displayed for public in India. The collection as per a publication from 1979 of Salar Jung Museum suggests that there were 984 objects with varying degree of craftsmanship. Most of the artefacts are from the Mughal Empire and some from the Asaf Jah Dynasty.

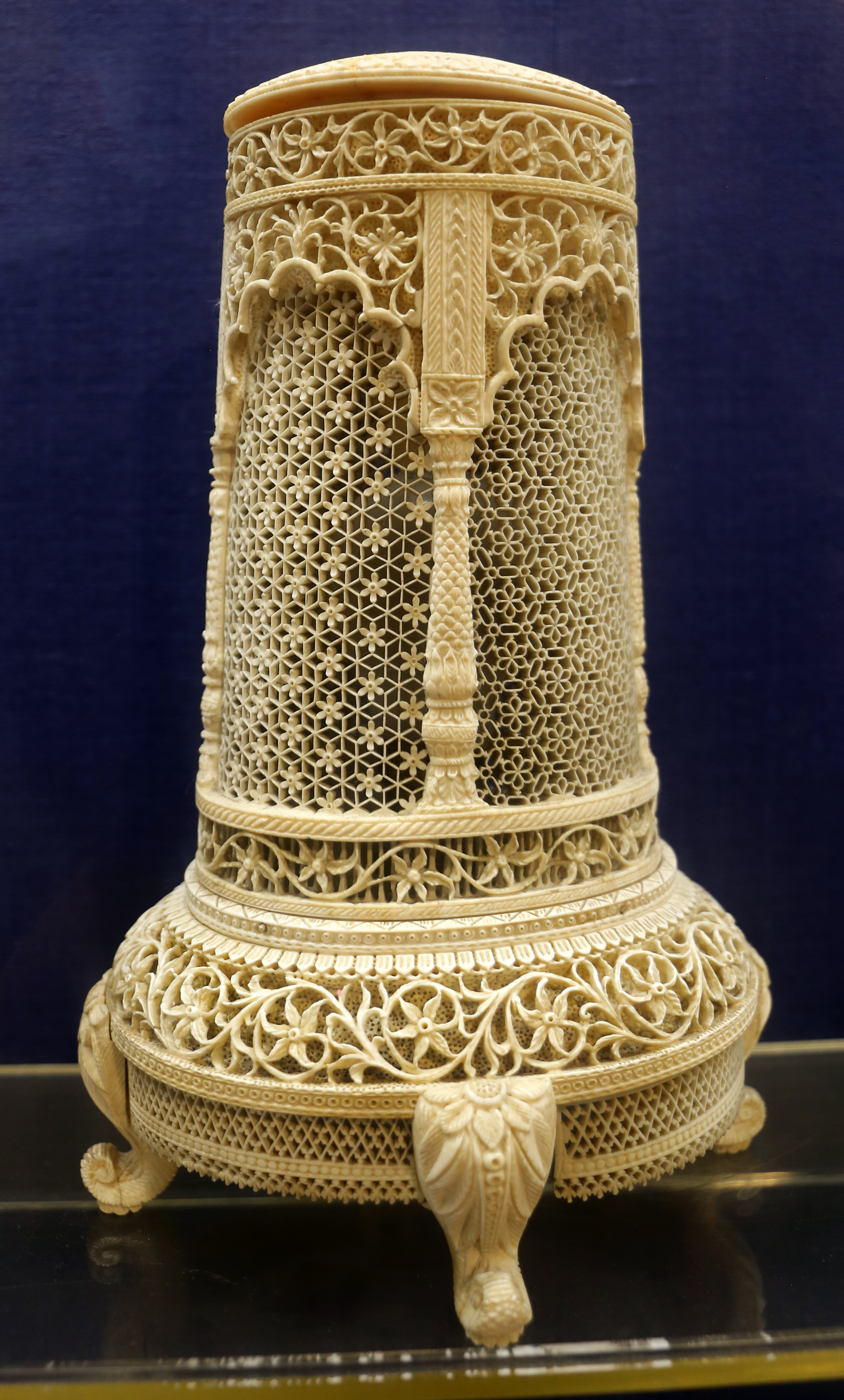
Intricate ivory carved lamp from Mysore

=== Western ===
In 1876, on a trip to France the unique "double sculpture", Mephistopheles and Margaretta was acquired by Salar Jung I. He also traveled to Rome, where he purchased a marble statue called Veiled Rebecca. The Salar Jung family had a history of collecting art, and eventually the collections of Salar Jung I, II and III all ended up in the Salar Jung Museum.

European art from British, French and Italian artists are displayed. Among works on show are some by the notable artists Canaletto, William-Adolphe Bouguereau and Francesco Hayez. The furniture collection includes pieces from the time of King Louis XIV and Napoleon. Salar Jung III collected about 43,000 artefacts and 50,000 books and manuscripts out of which only few are displayed in today's museum.

=== Eastern ===
The Eastern block houses Japanese artworks, porcelain pieces, samurai swords and sculptures from China, Japan, Tibet and Burma.

=== Quran collections ===
The museum has a famous Quran collection, from around the world in different fonts and designs, called the Quran Written with Gold and Silver. There are many more collections of religious books, as well as Arabic Quran.

=== Clocks ===
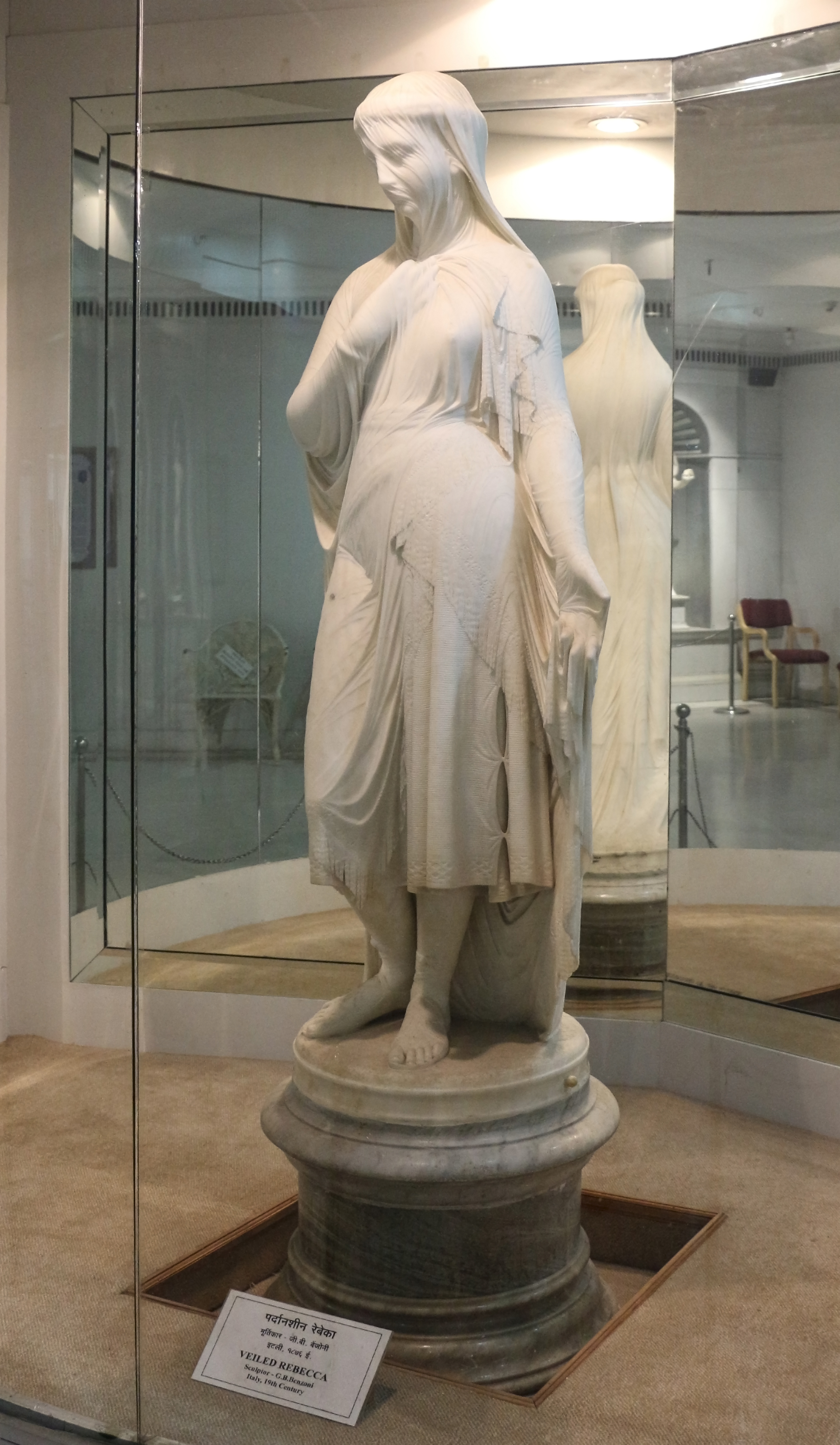
The Veiled Rebecca (1863), by Giovanni Maria Benzoni

A variety and array of clocks are in the clock room. There are ancient sundials in the form of obelisks to huge and modern clocks of the twentieth century. Others in the range vary from miniature clocks which need a magnifying glass to view closely, to stately grandfather clocks from place such as France, Germany, Italy, Switzerland and Britain, including the musical clock Salar Jung bought from Cook and Kelvey of England.

The variety of clocks includes the bird cage clocks, bracket clocks, grandfather clocks, skeleton clocks, etc. The museum also has examples of the clocks of the contemporary period of Louis XV, Louis XVI, and Napoleon 1st of France.

The Indian Parliament has declared the museum an Institution of National Importance.

=== Coins ===
There is a collection of about 600 coins the from VijayNagar dynasty to Bahmani empire, Moghul empire and Modern India. A few coins are 2300 years old. Some Punch Mark coins from Kushan dynasty are also preserved. The coins are made of silver, copper, lead.

== Facilities ==
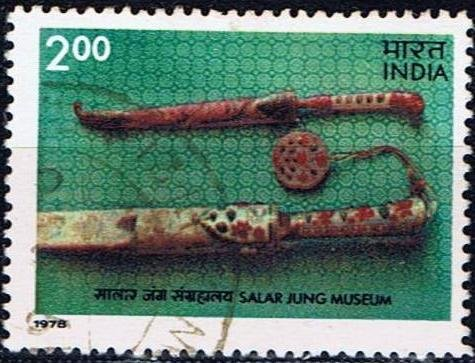
Salar Jung Museum Indian postage stamp, 1978

The museum building, semicircular in shape with 38 galleries, spread on two floors, displays only a part of the original collection. The ground floor has 20 galleries and the first floor has 18 galleries. The exhibits on different subjects are displayed in separate galleries. Each gallery is huge and has many artefacts on display including ones dating back to the 4th century. There are plans for a new Islamic Gallery, where Islamic artefacts and manuscripts of the Qur'an will be displayed.

Apart from the galleries, there is a reference library, reading room, publication and education section, chemical conservation lab, sales counter, cafeteria etc.

== Gallery ==
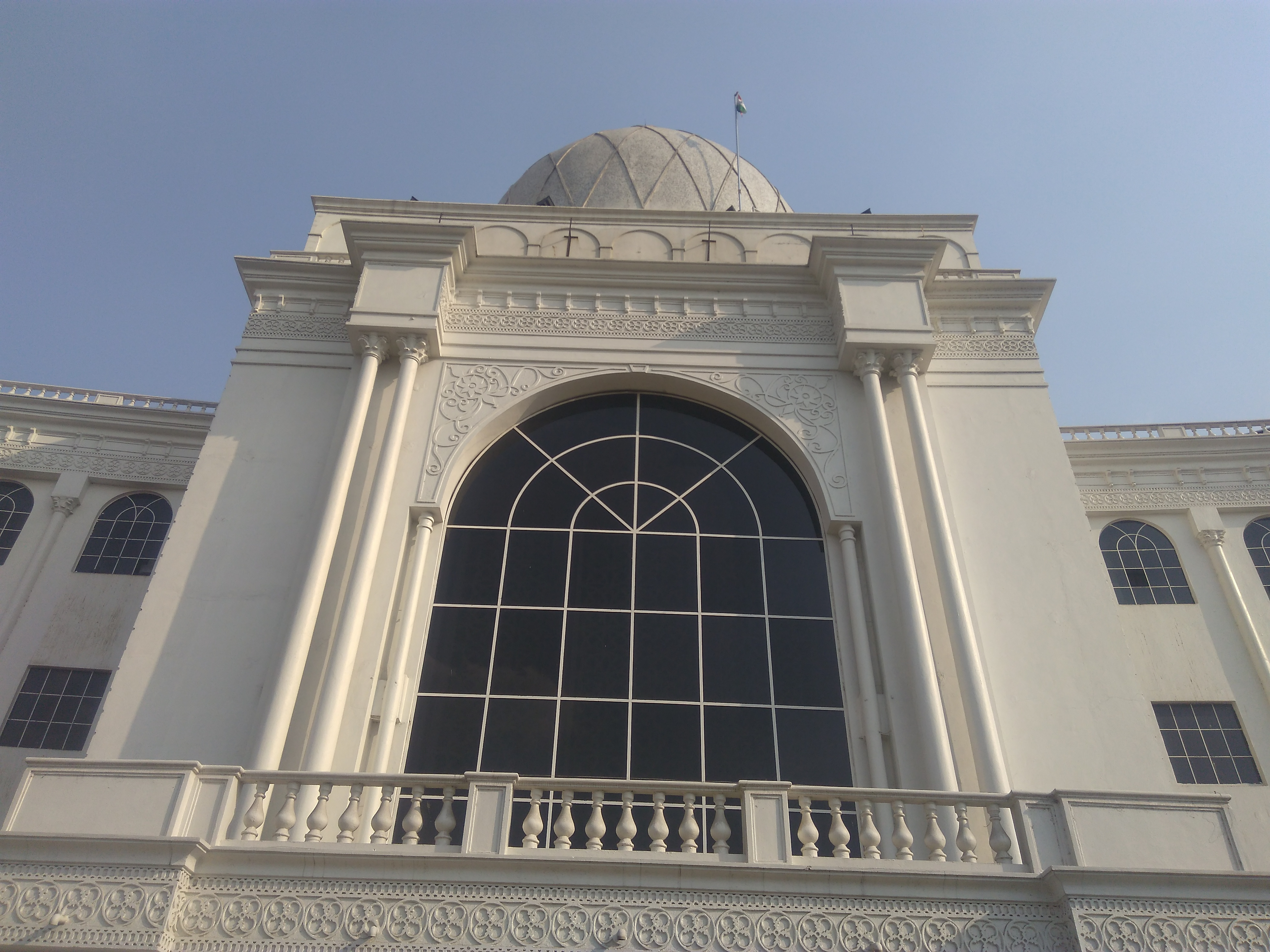
Front view of Salar Jung Museum

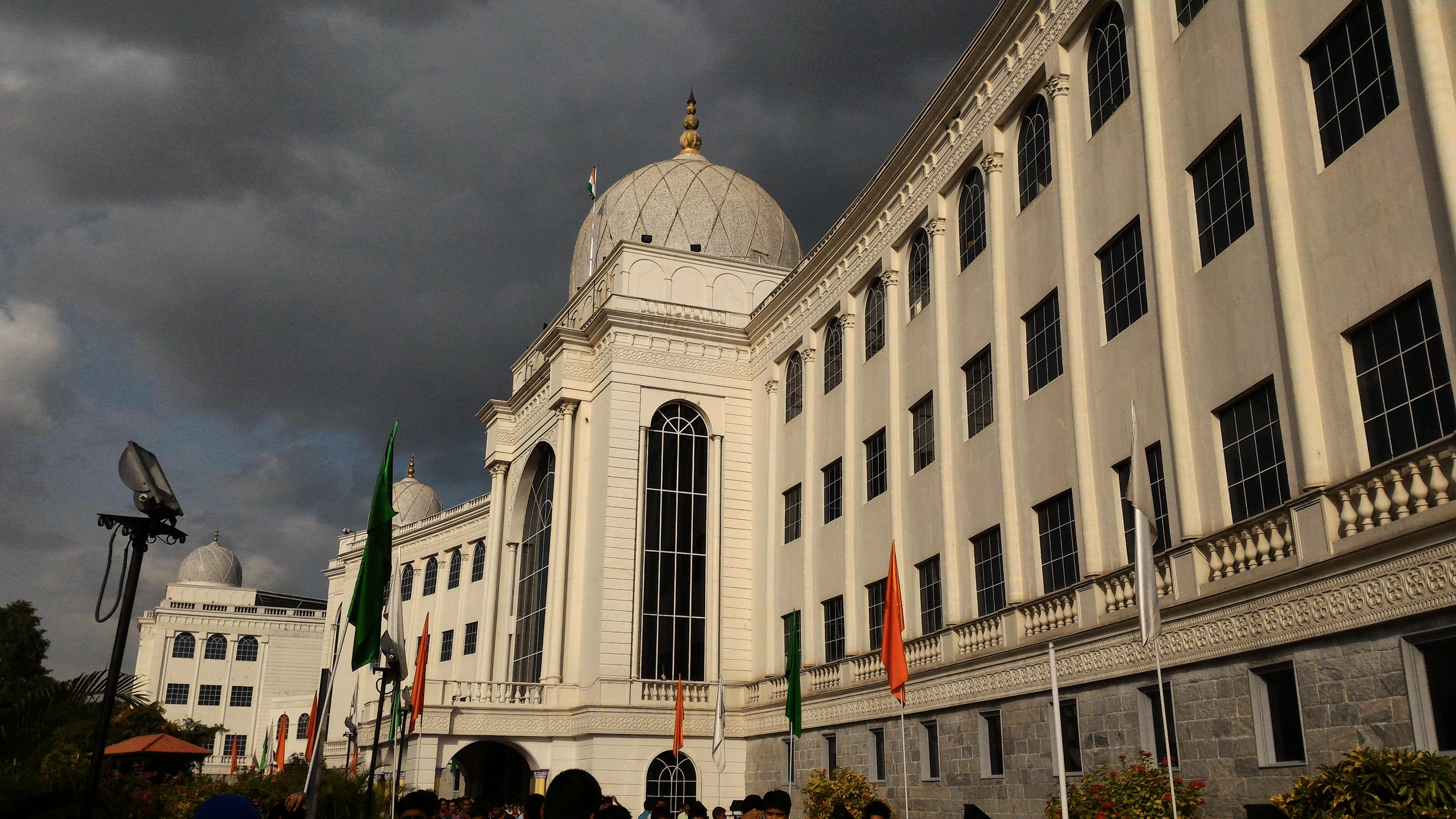
Museum building against cloudy backdrop

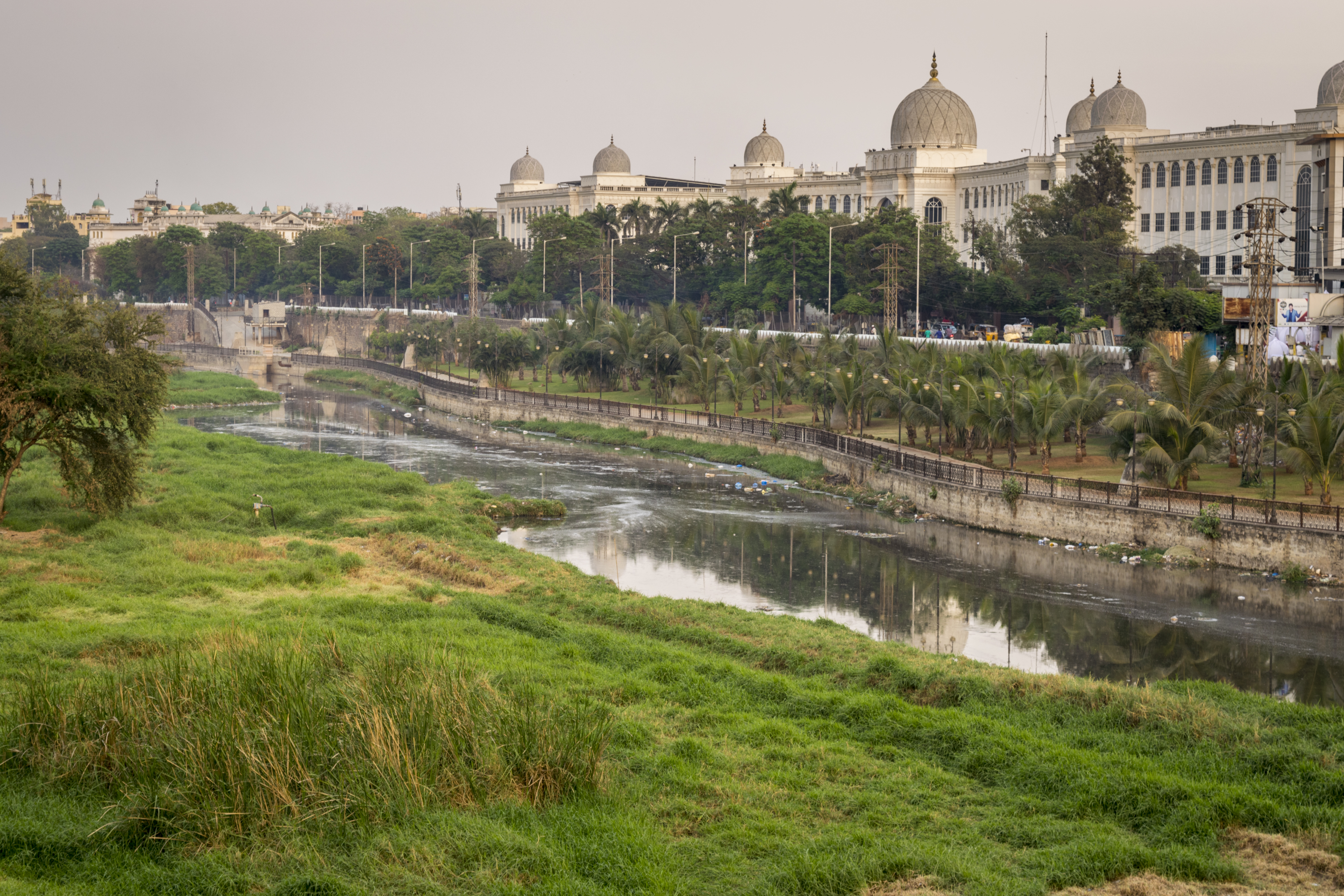
A view of Salar Jung Museum along with Musi River

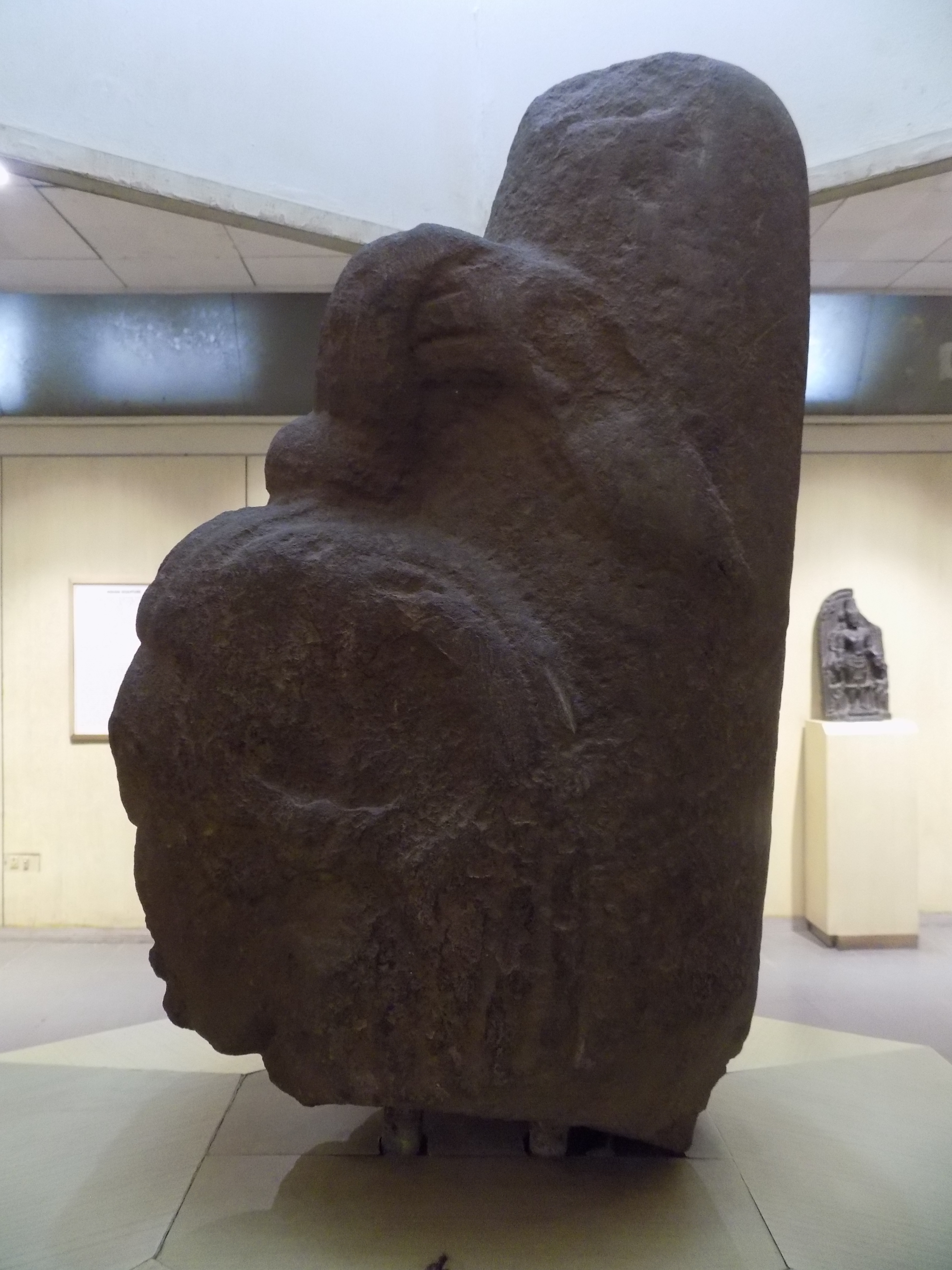
Eka-Mukhalinga, 4th or 5th century CE

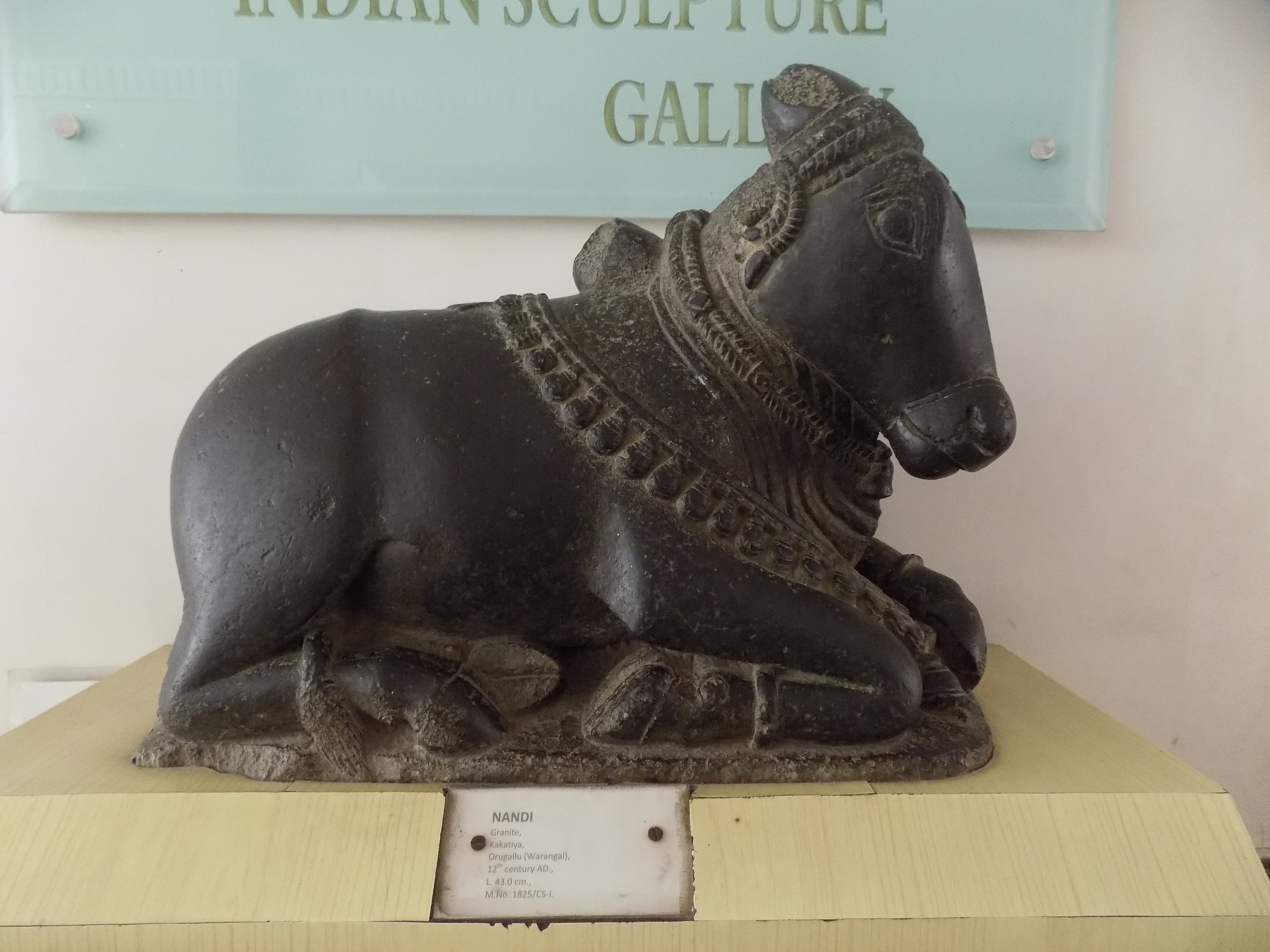
Nandi, 12th century CE

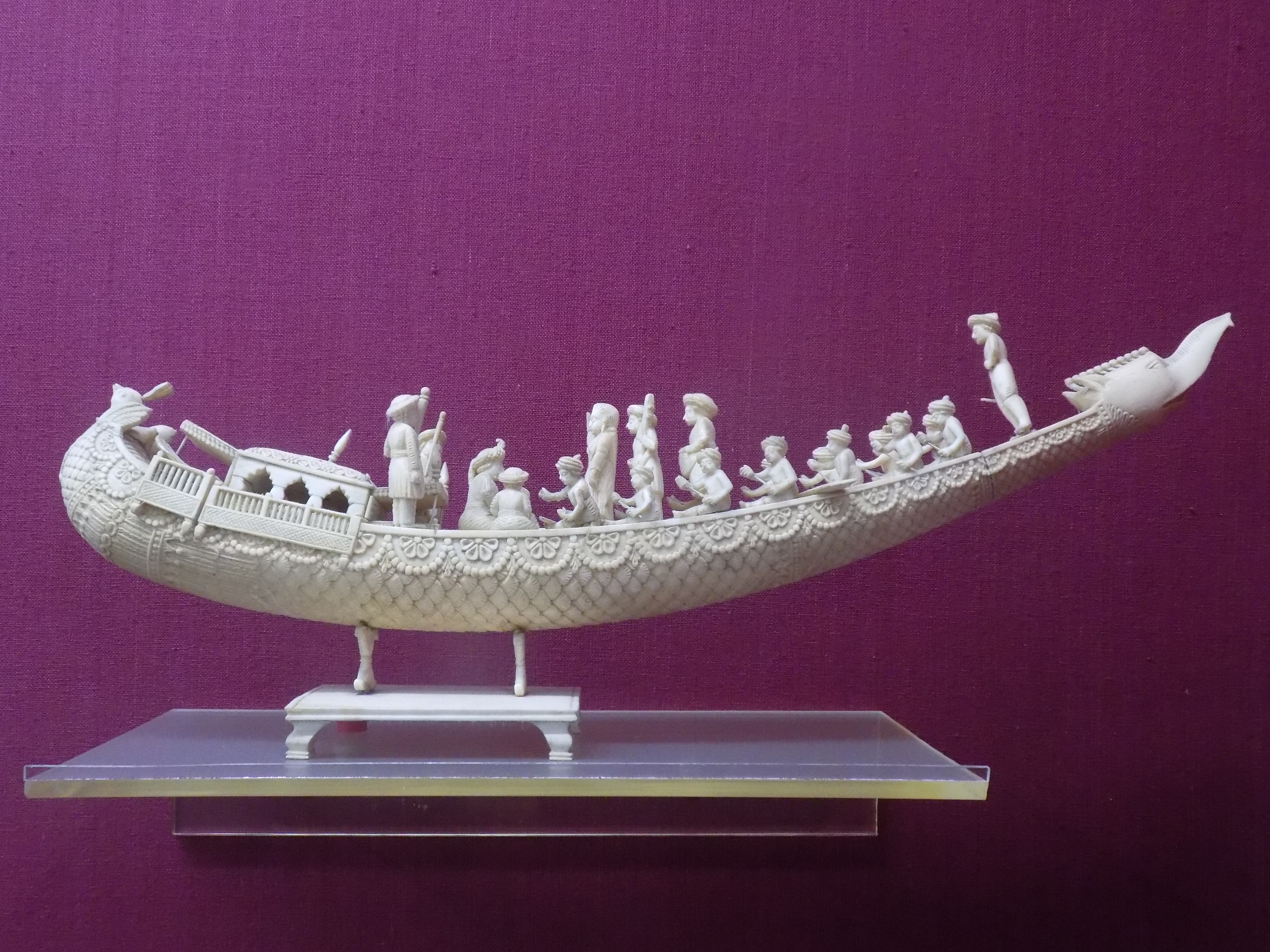
Mayur Pankhi in ivory

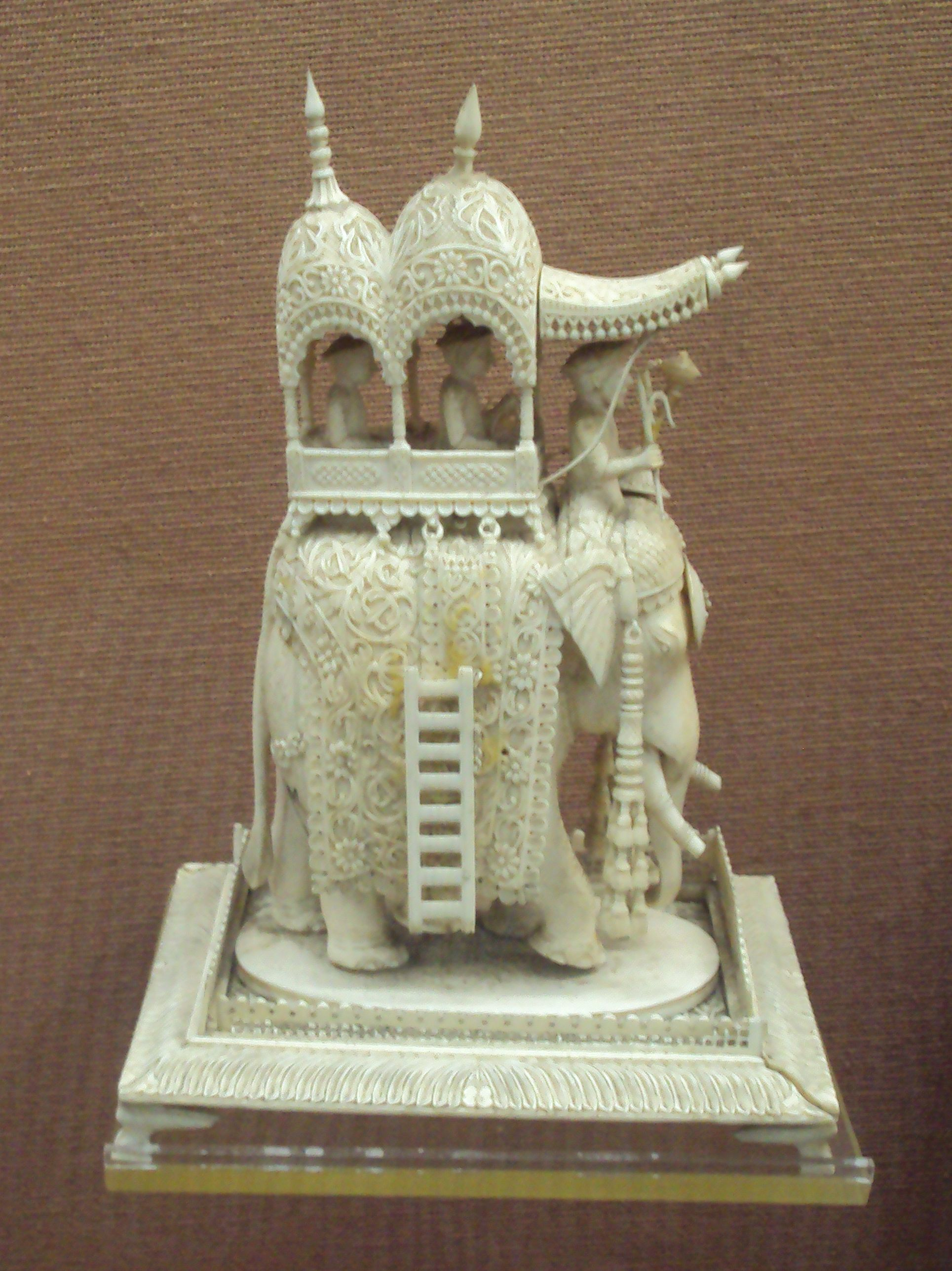
Royal elephant in ivory

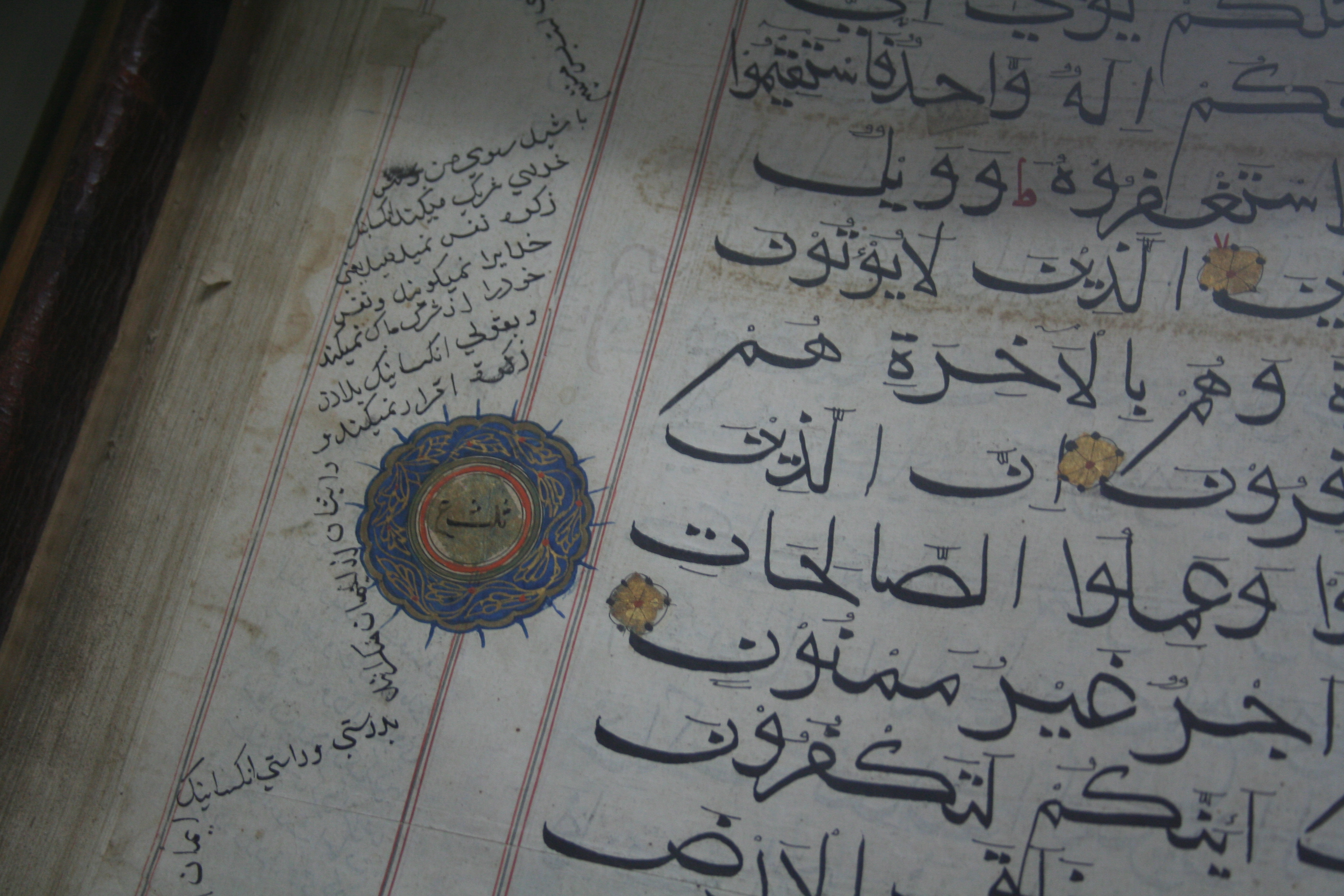
Arabic calligraphy (from the Quran)

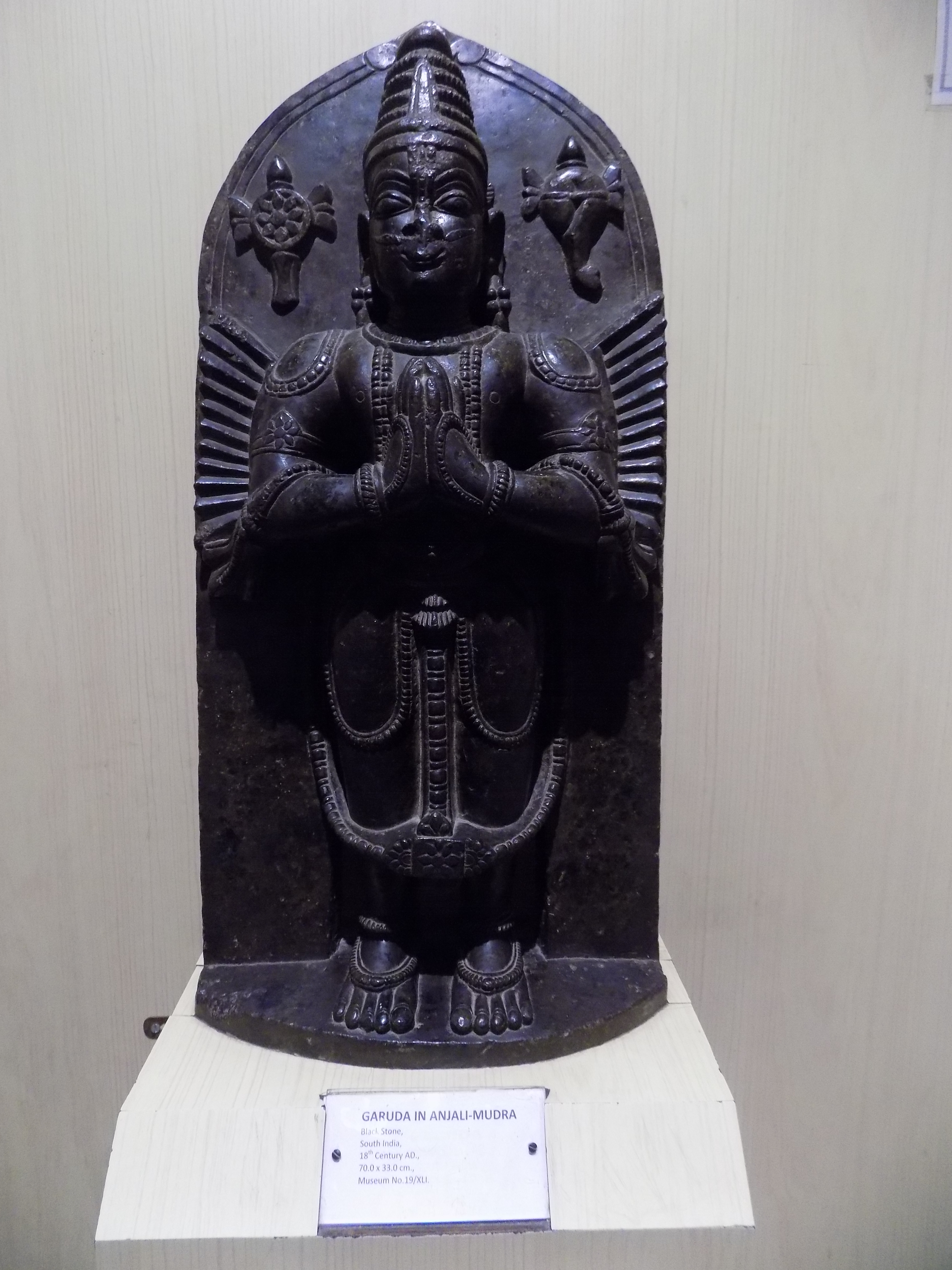
Garuda in Anjali Mudra, 18th century CE

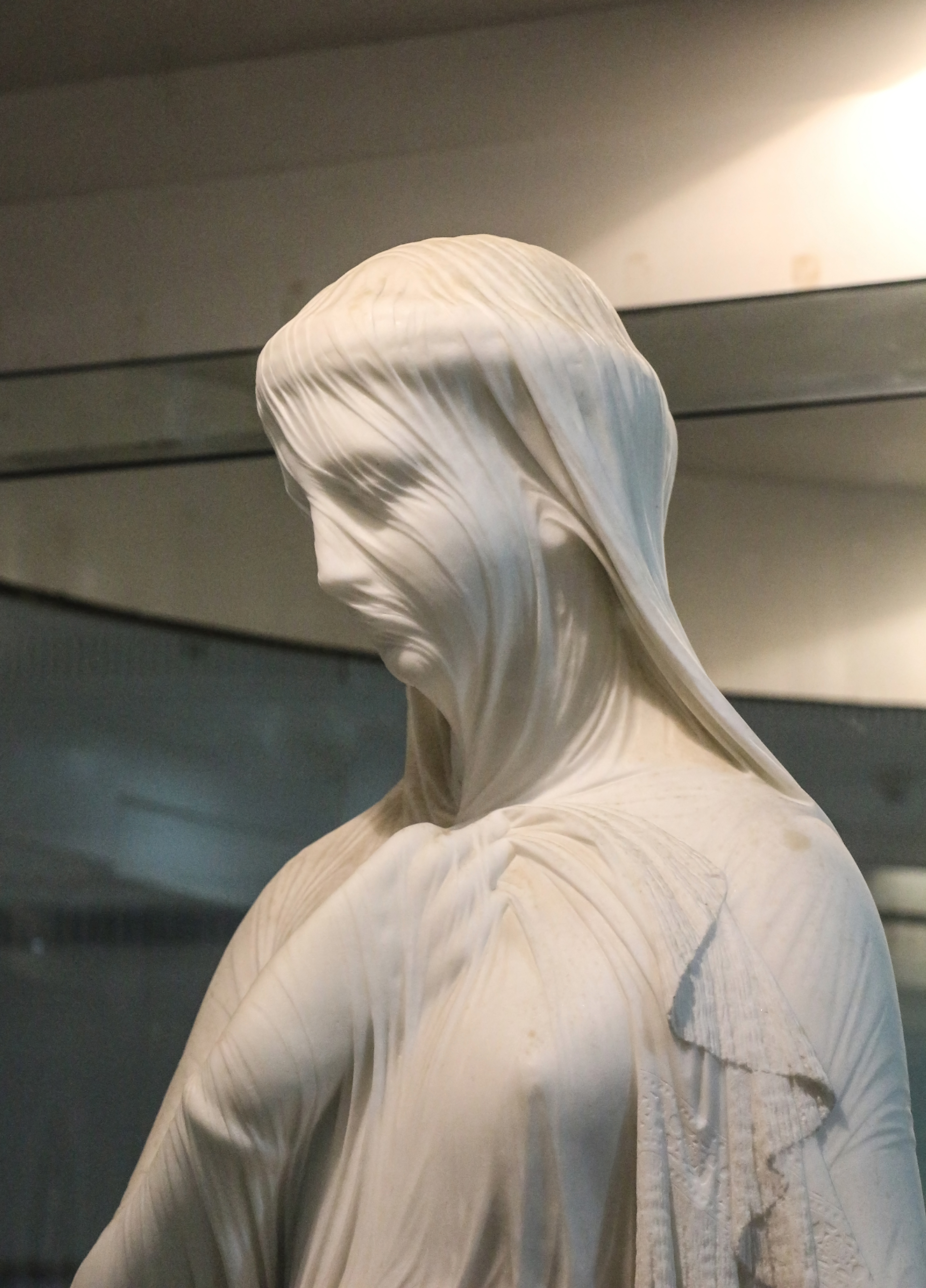
The Veiled Rebecca: melody in marble, 1863

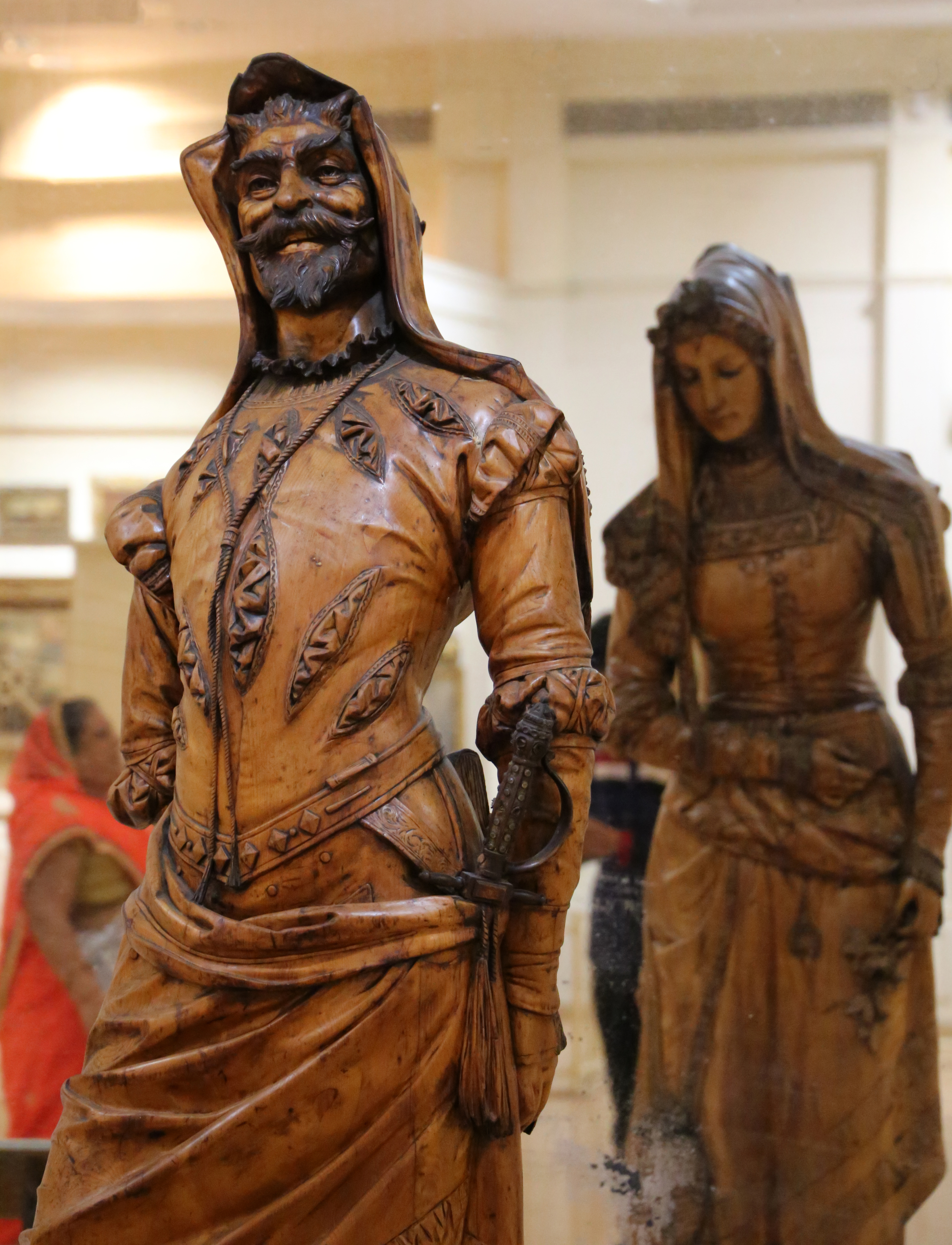
Mephistopheles and Margaretta, c. 1876

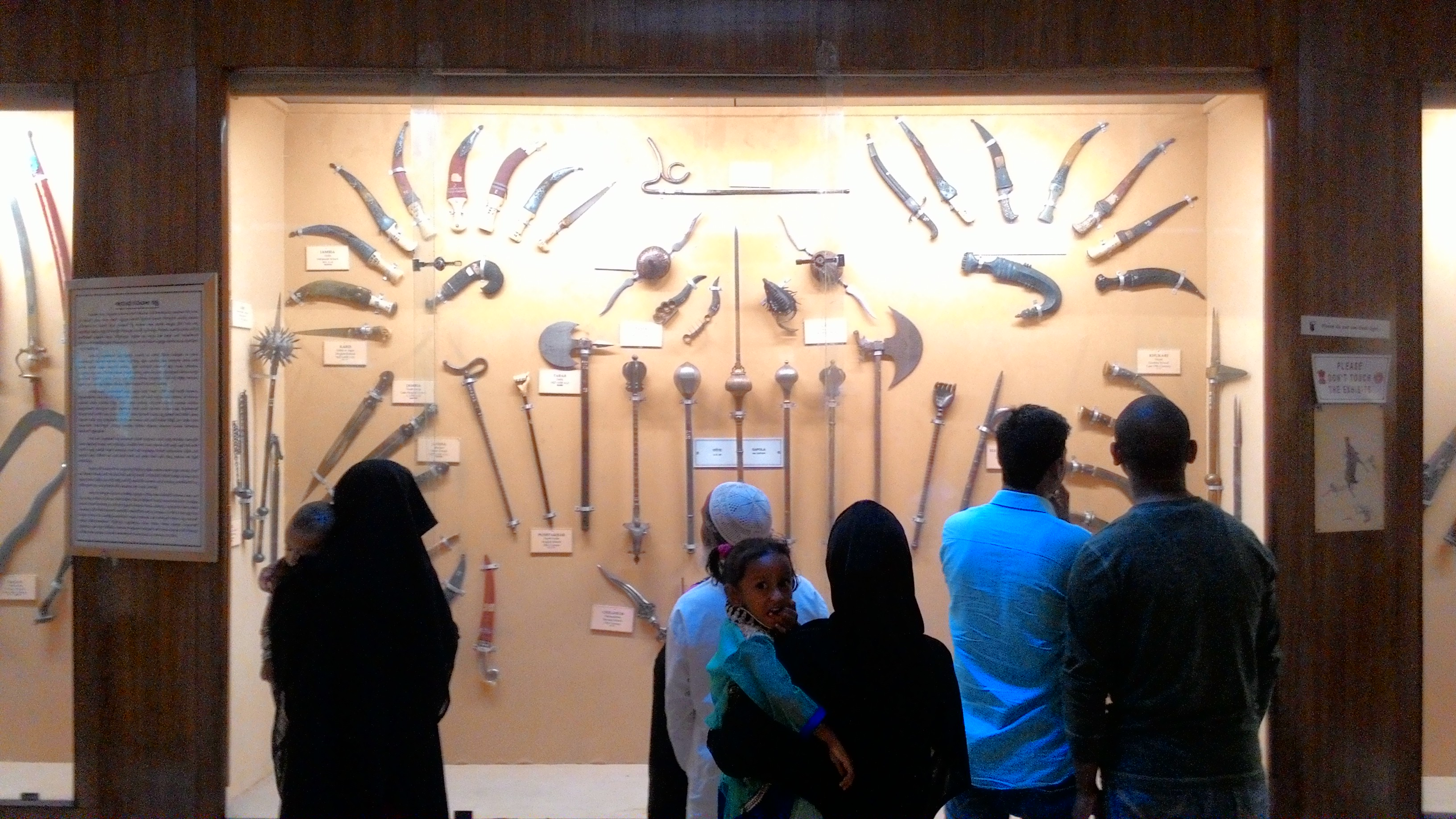
Knives and hammers

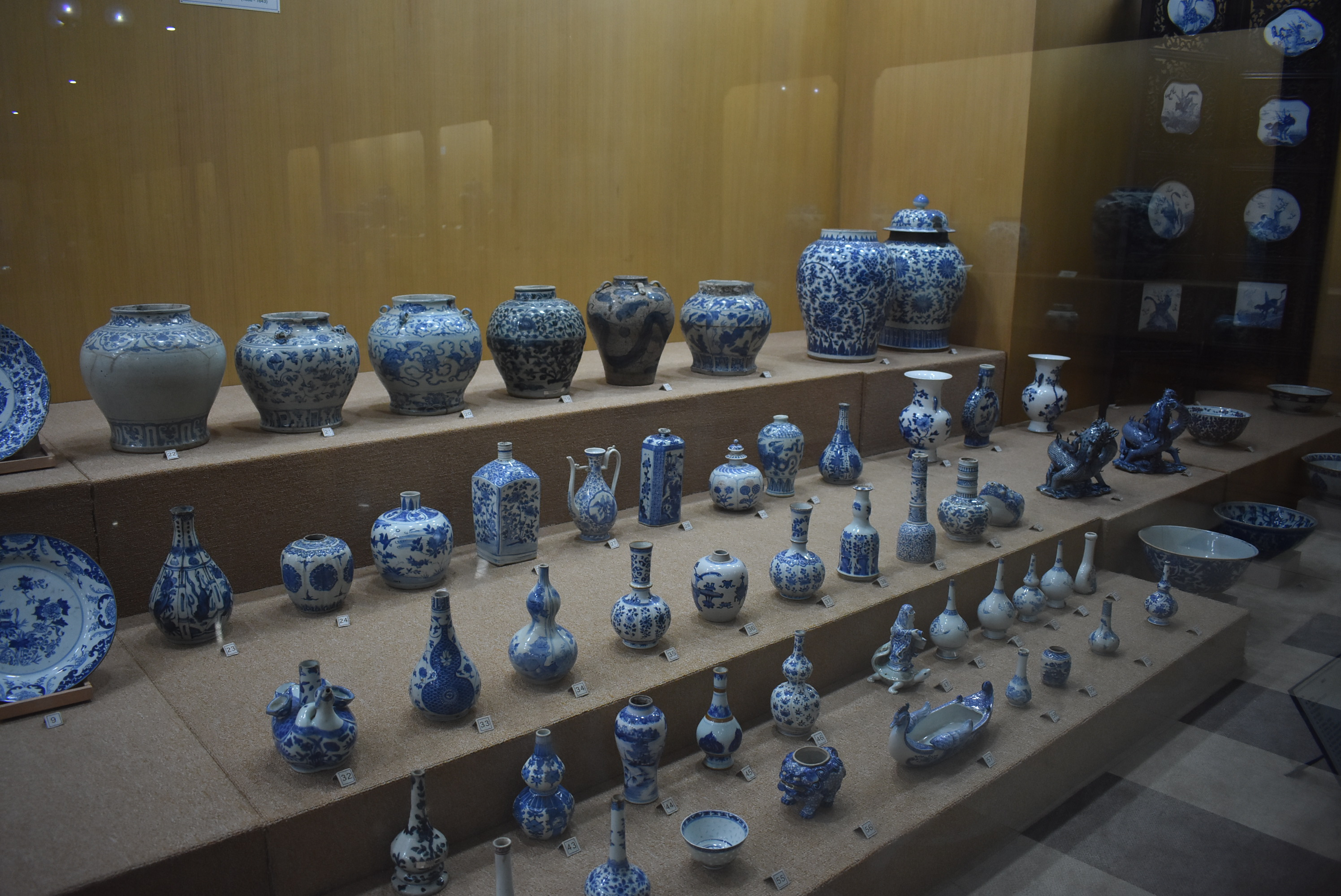
Porcelain collection

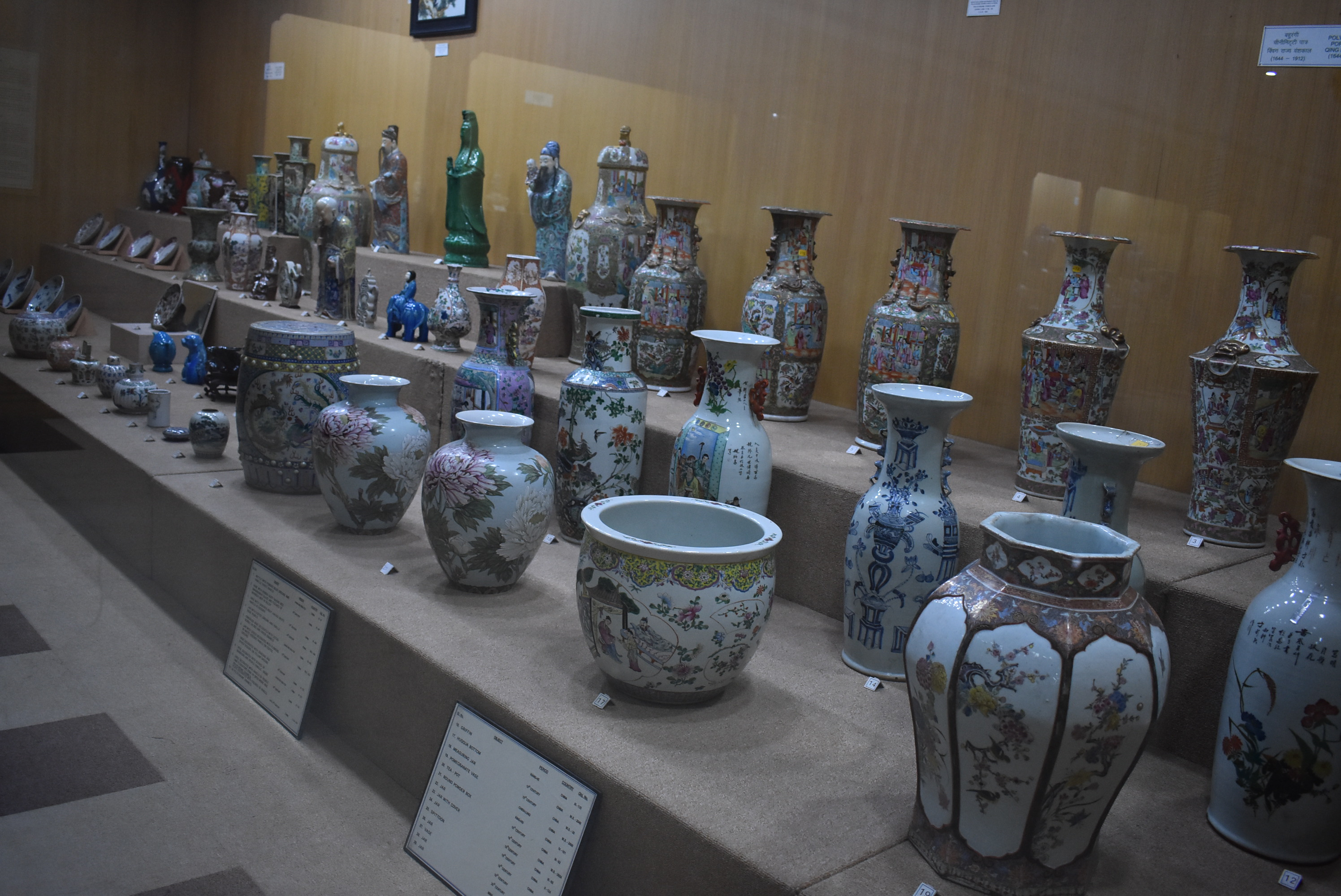

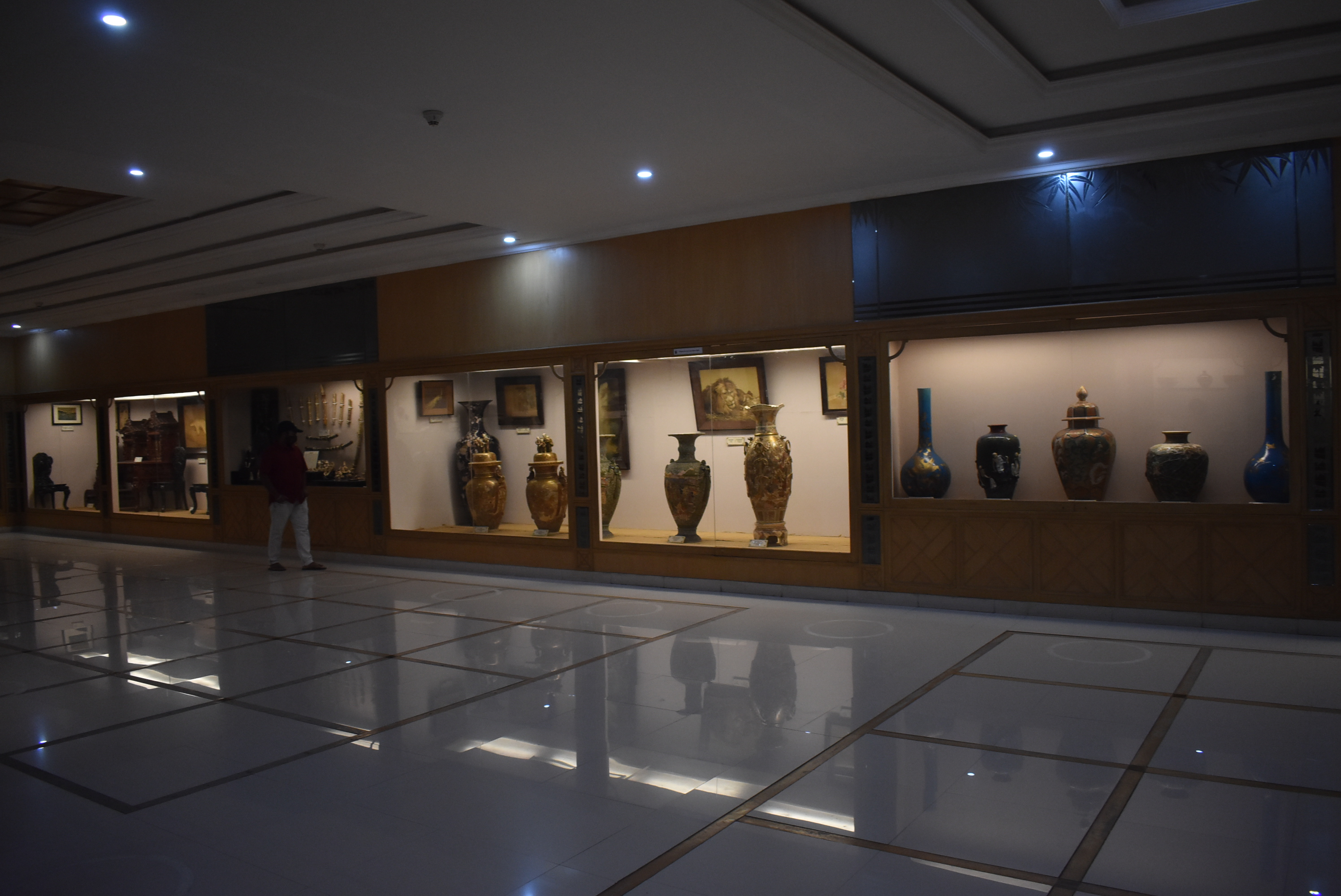

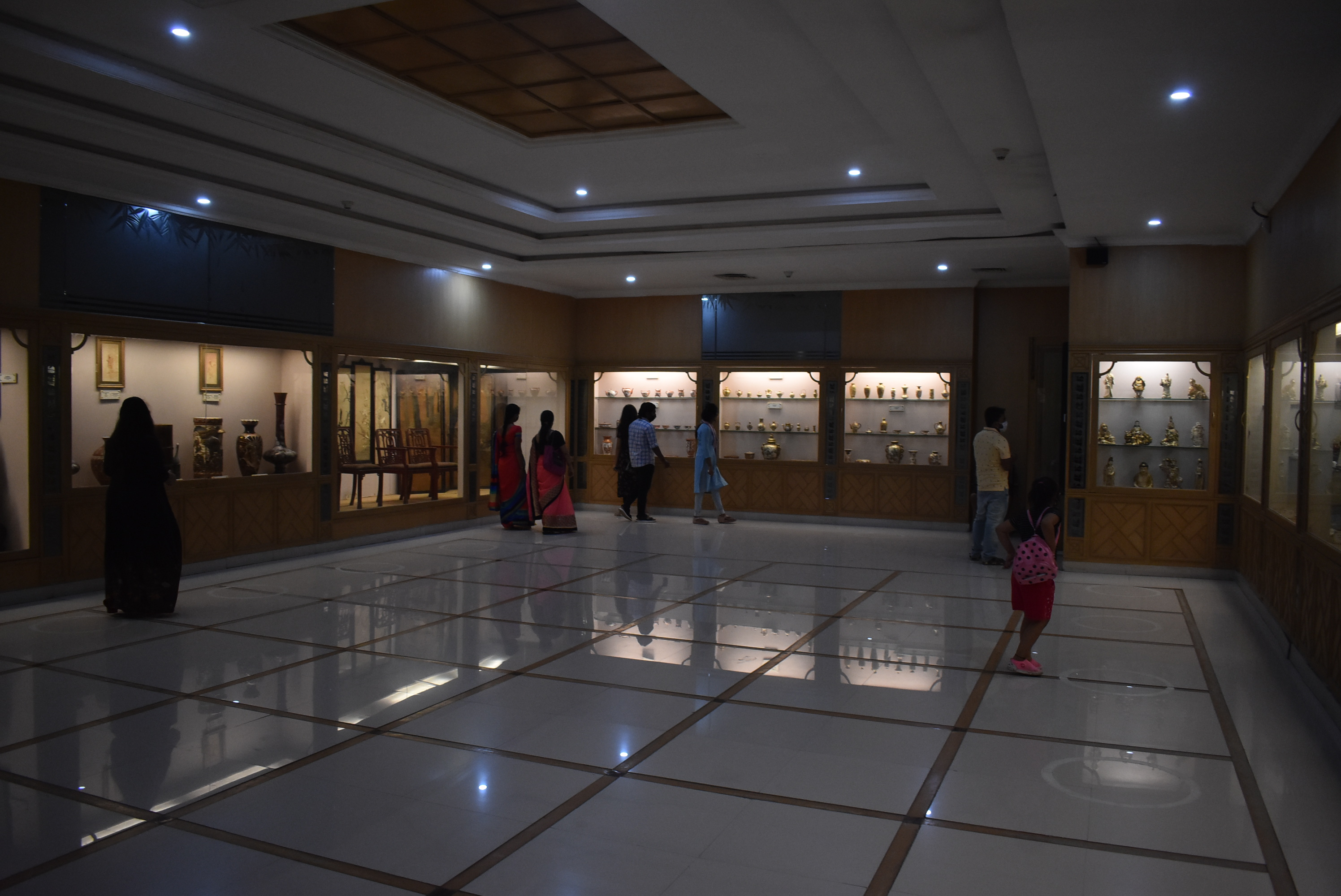

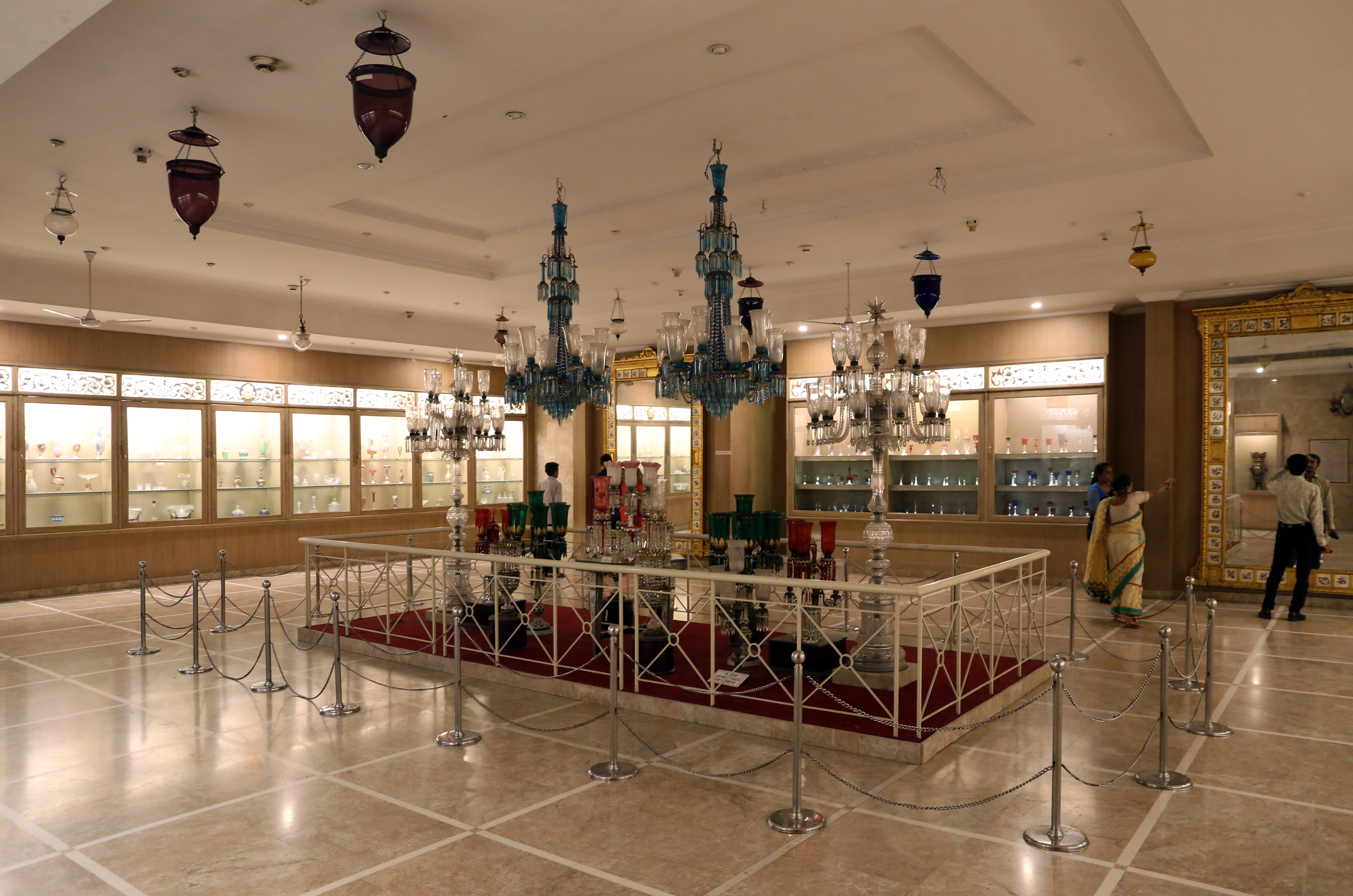

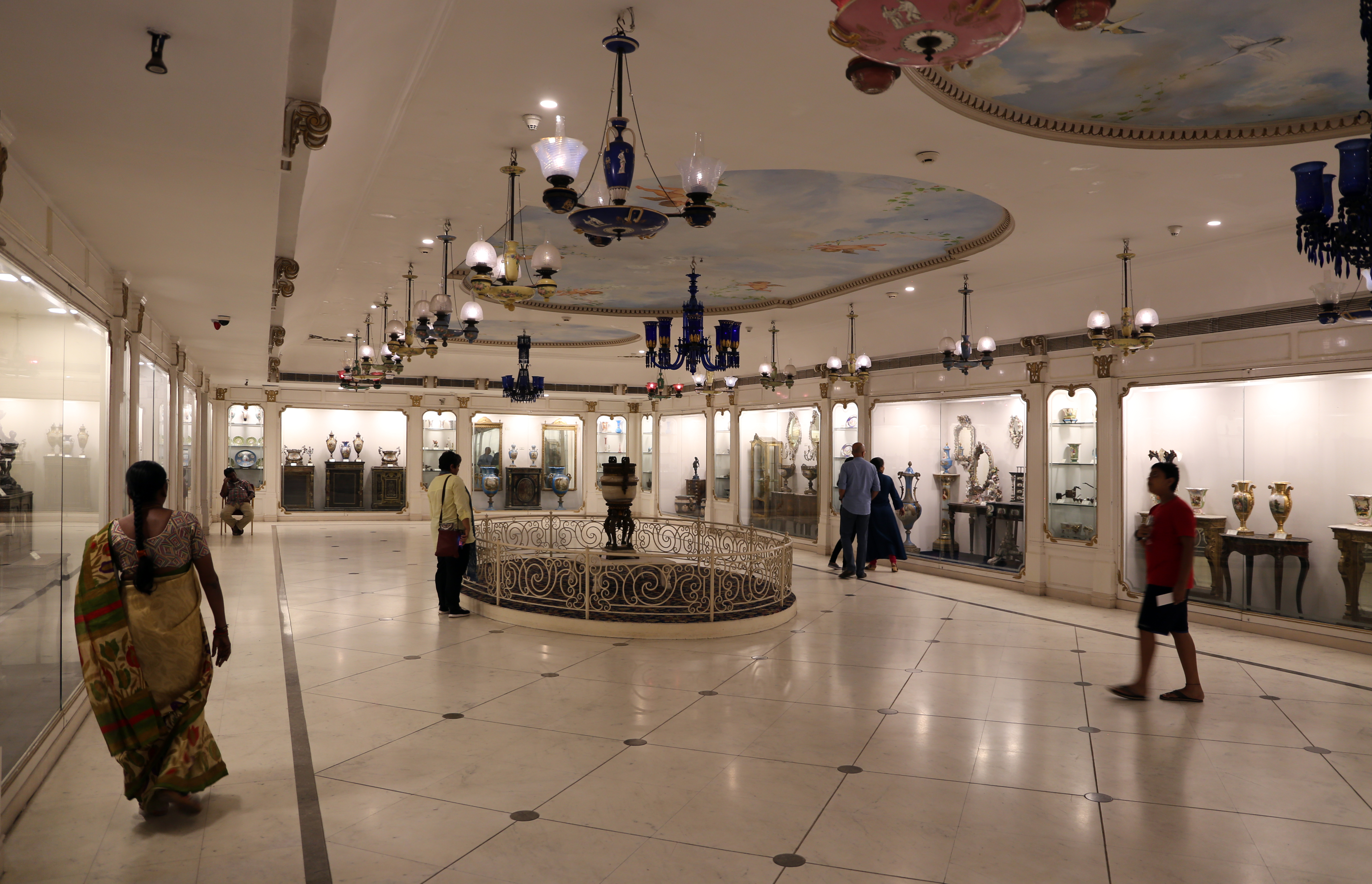

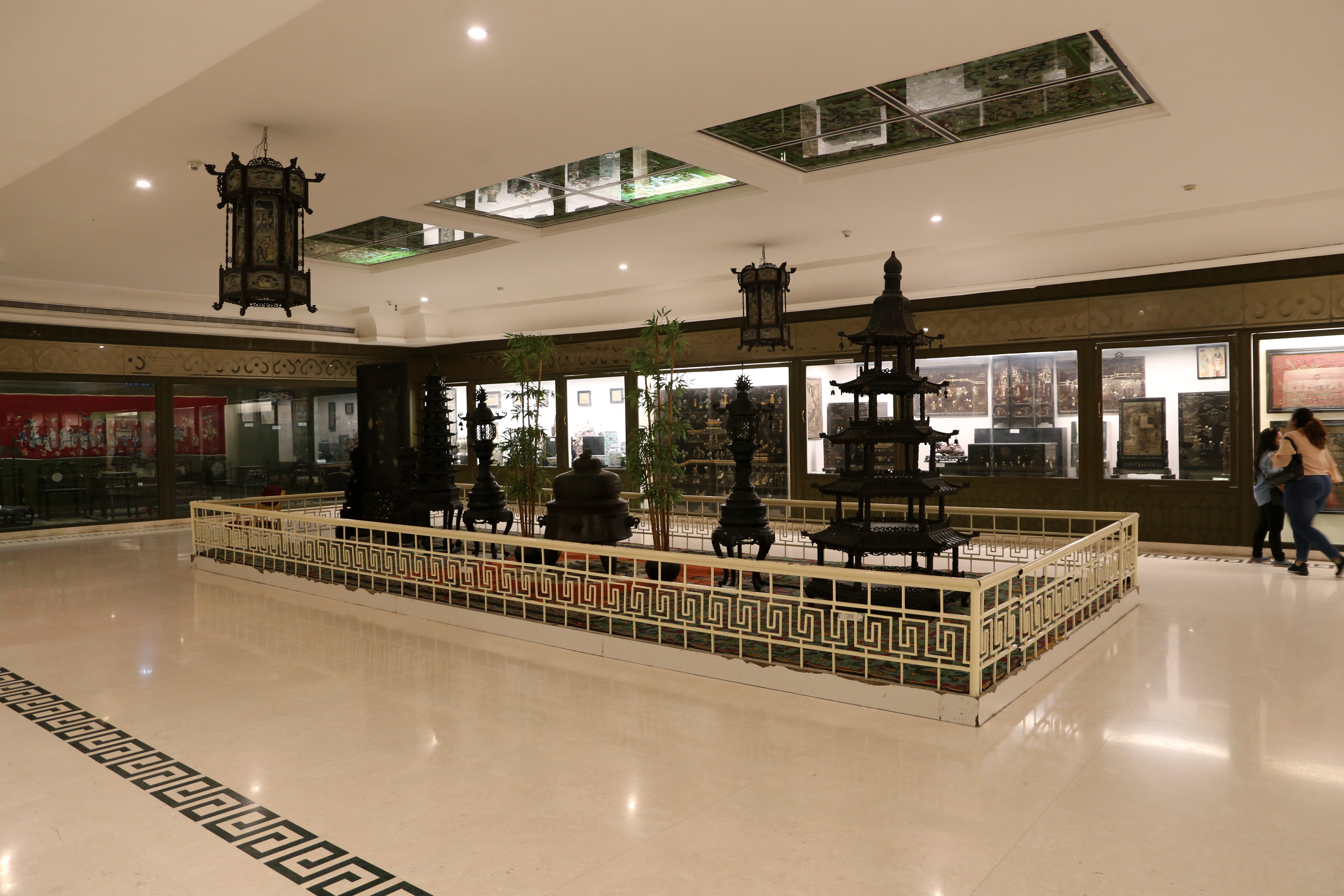

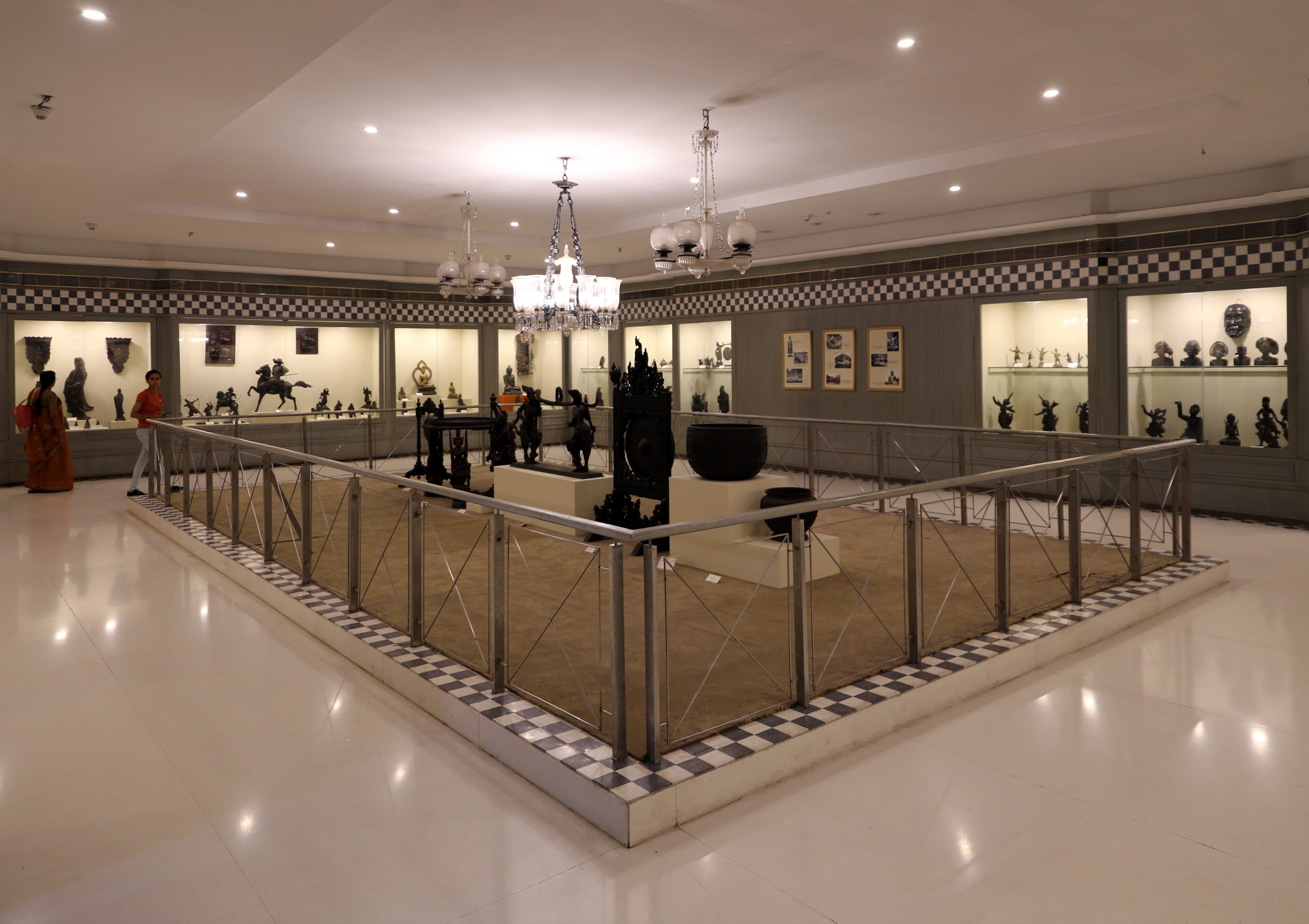

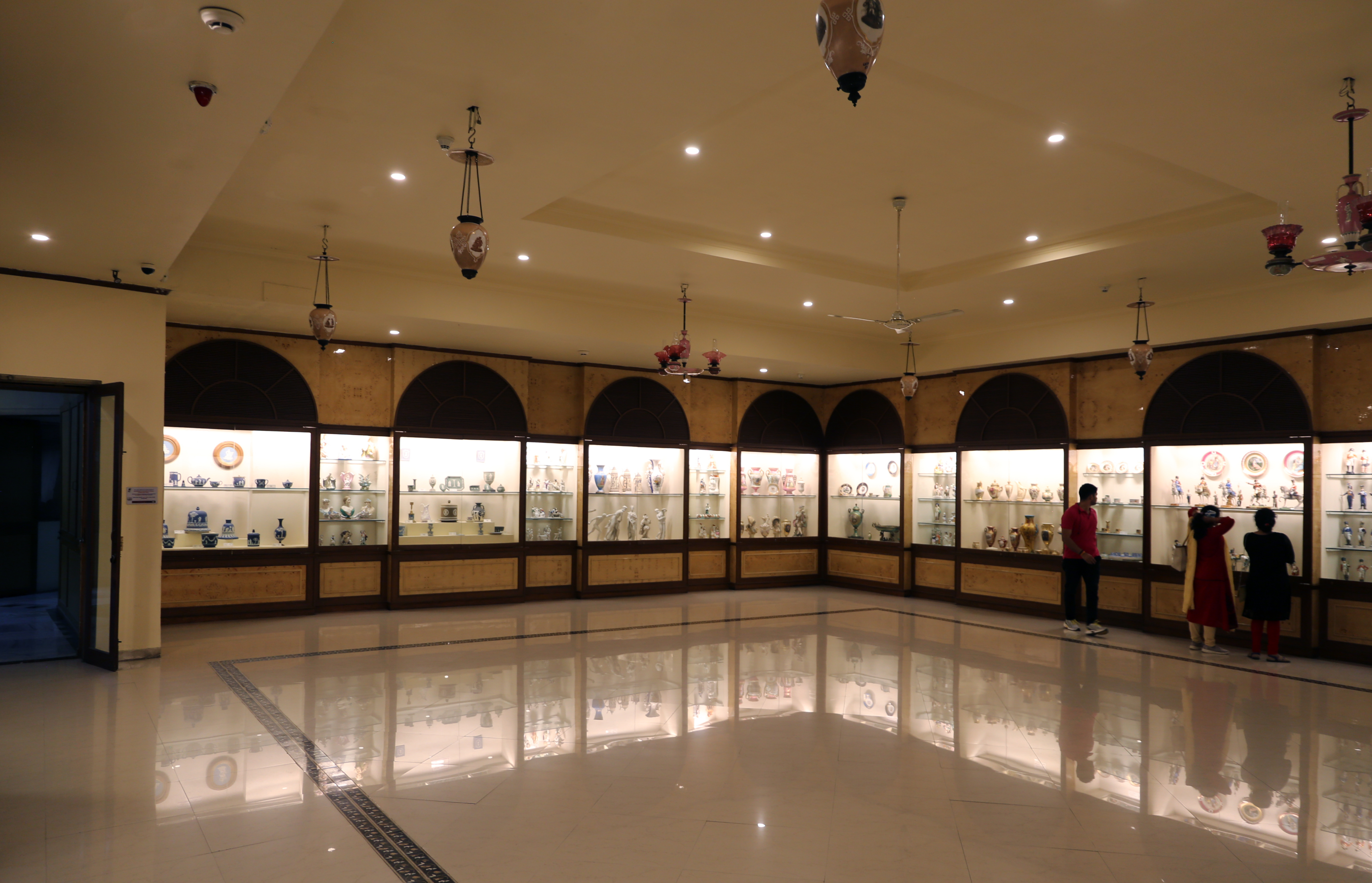

== See also ==
- List of museums in India
- List of largest art museums
- Salar Jung III
