= Mephistopheles and Margaretta =

19th-century double sculpture

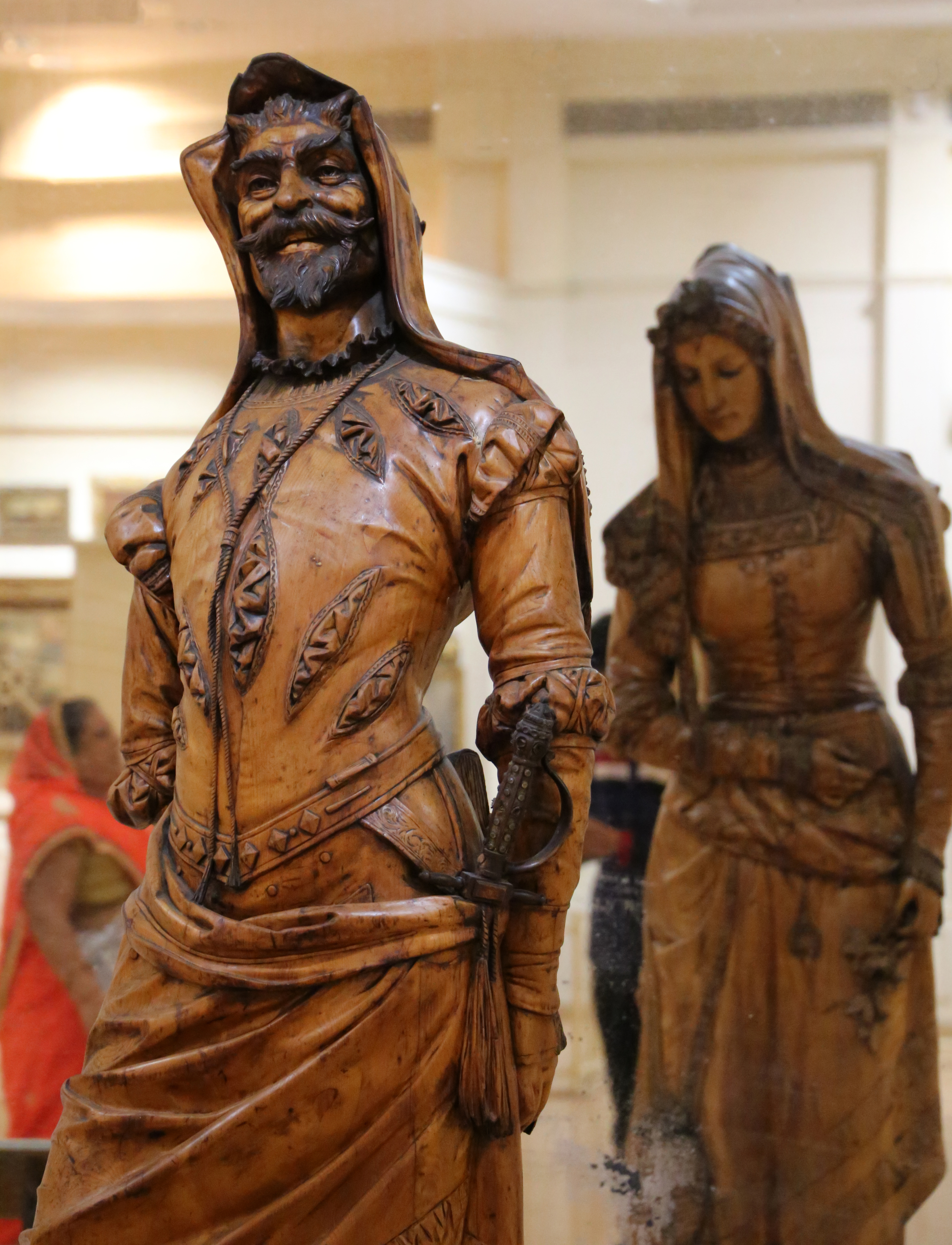
- Mephistopheles and Margaretta, with the reverse visible in a mirror
- Medium: Sycamore wood
- Subject: Characters from Goethe's Faust
- Dimensions: 177.2 cm (69.8 in)
- Location: Salar Jung Museum, Hyderabad, India

Mephistopheles and Margaretta is a 19th-century wooden double sculpture on display in the Salar Jung Museum in Hyderabad, India. The sculpture features two images carved on opposite sides, portraying two characters from German playwright Johann Wolfgang von Goethe's 1808 play Faust. The obverse depicts the demon Mephistopheles, and the reverse depicts Margaretta. A mirror placed behind the sculpture allows both sides to be seen simultaneously.

== Background ==
The statue reflects the themes of good and evil in Goethe's Faust.

In the play, Faust is frustrated with his life and attempts suicide. He calls for Satan's help, and the demon Mephistopheles, an agent of Satan, responds. Faust is told that Mephistopheles will serve him as long as he lives, but after his death, Faust would forfeit his soul and become enslaved forever. He agrees, making a deal with the Devil, and as one of his requests for magic, Mephistopheles seduces a young woman named Gretchen (Margaretta) for Faust. She is impregnated by Faust and gives birth to their bastard son. Upon realizing the evil, Gretchen drowns her child and is subsequently imprisoned on charges of murder. She is ultimately hanged, but is granted entry into heaven. Faust is also saved by God because of Gretchen's pleadings.

The statue is one of the major attractions of the Salar Jung Museum's European Art Section, and is one of the museum's most photographed exhibits. It was presumably created in the late 19th century by an unknown French sculptor, and was acquired by the former Prime Minister of Hyderabad Salar Jung I in 1876 during his travels in France. The choice of Faust, a traditional German story, reflects the growing interest in German subjects in late-nineteenth-century France.

== Description ==
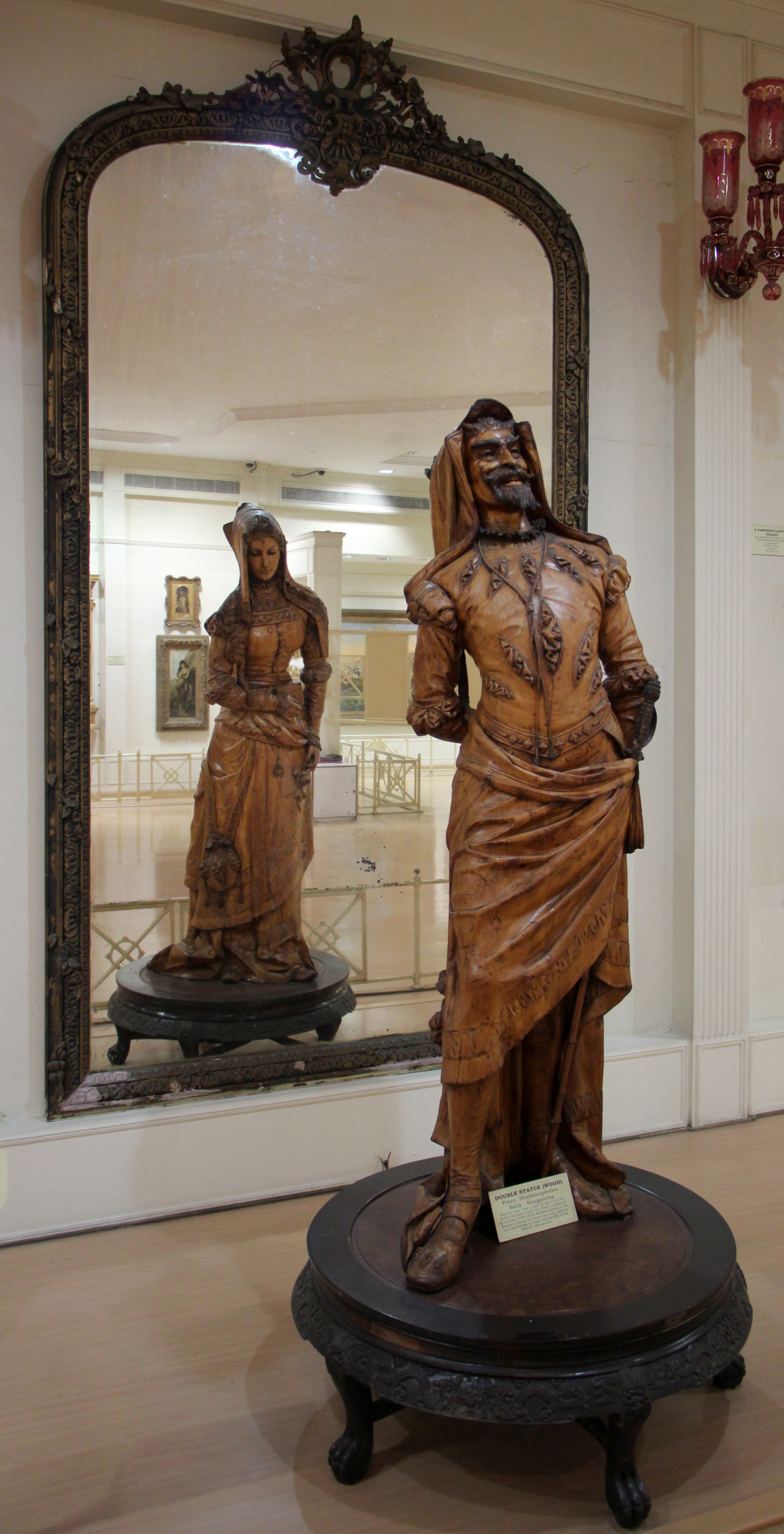
Full size of the sculpture

The statue is 177.2 cm tall and carved out of a single block of sycamore wood. It is exhibited with a mirror placed behind it, allowing viewers to observe both sides at the same time.

The obverse is a depiction of a confident and arrogant Mephistopheles, wearing a hood and boots, and with a smirk on his face. On the reverse side, Gretchen is depicted with her head bowed, appearing as a simple girl with downcast eyes.

The dichotomy of good and evil is emphasized by the contrast between the innocence of Margaretta, a demure woman holding a prayer book in her hand, and the evil exemplified by Mephistopheles.

== See also ==
- Mephistopheles in the arts and popular culture
- Devil in the arts and popular culture
