= Skeleton clock =

Clocks with visible inner workings

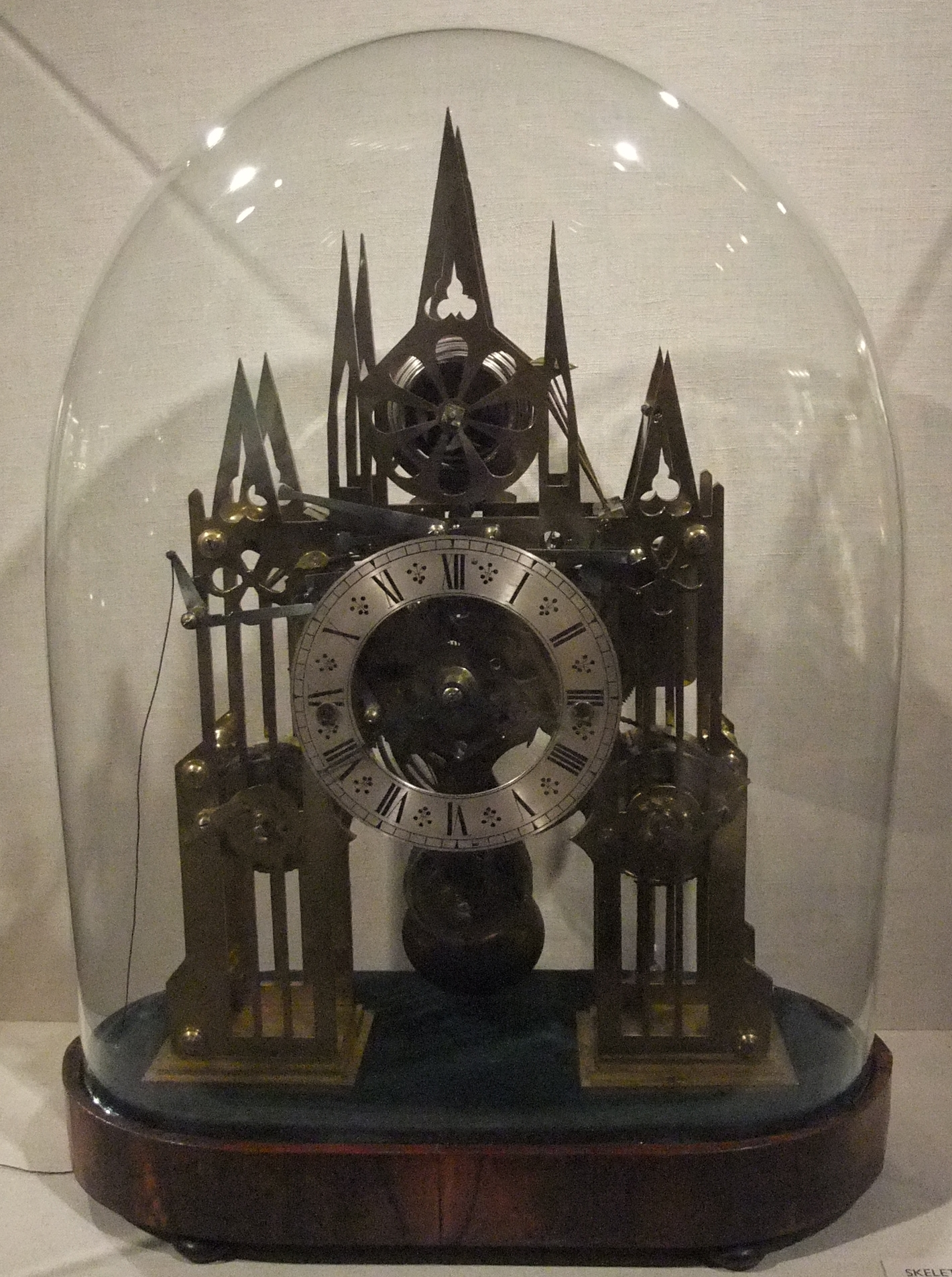

A skeleton clock is any clock or wristwatch, though typically mechanical in nature, in which the parts that usually conceal the inner workings of the mechanism have been removed or significantly modified so as to display these inner parts.

It is considered to be a showcase design and intentionally exposes to plain view the various gears, wheels and springs within the movement itself. There is no official definition of a skeleton clock per se, but a major portion of the main parts of the timepiece should be openly visible from the front of the clock and most often from the back as well in order for it to be considered and accepted as a skeleton clock. The parts most commonly showcased by a skeleton design are those exhibiting either the most movement or the most attractive design. These may include, but are not limited to the escapement, balance wheel and balance spring, mainspring, and tourbillon. Generally there is either no dial present in a skeleton clock, the dial is clear, or it has been limited to a ring around the edge of the case to provide a mounting surface for the hour markers. In the case of skeleton wristwatches, the back will usually be made of sapphire crystal or another clear material that affords easy examination of the parts protected within both from the front and from behind.

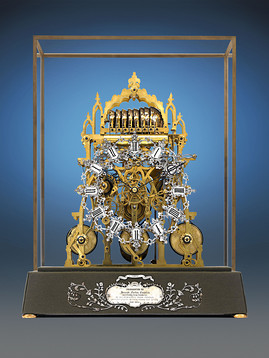
English Skeleton Clock by Smith & Sons. Dated 1864

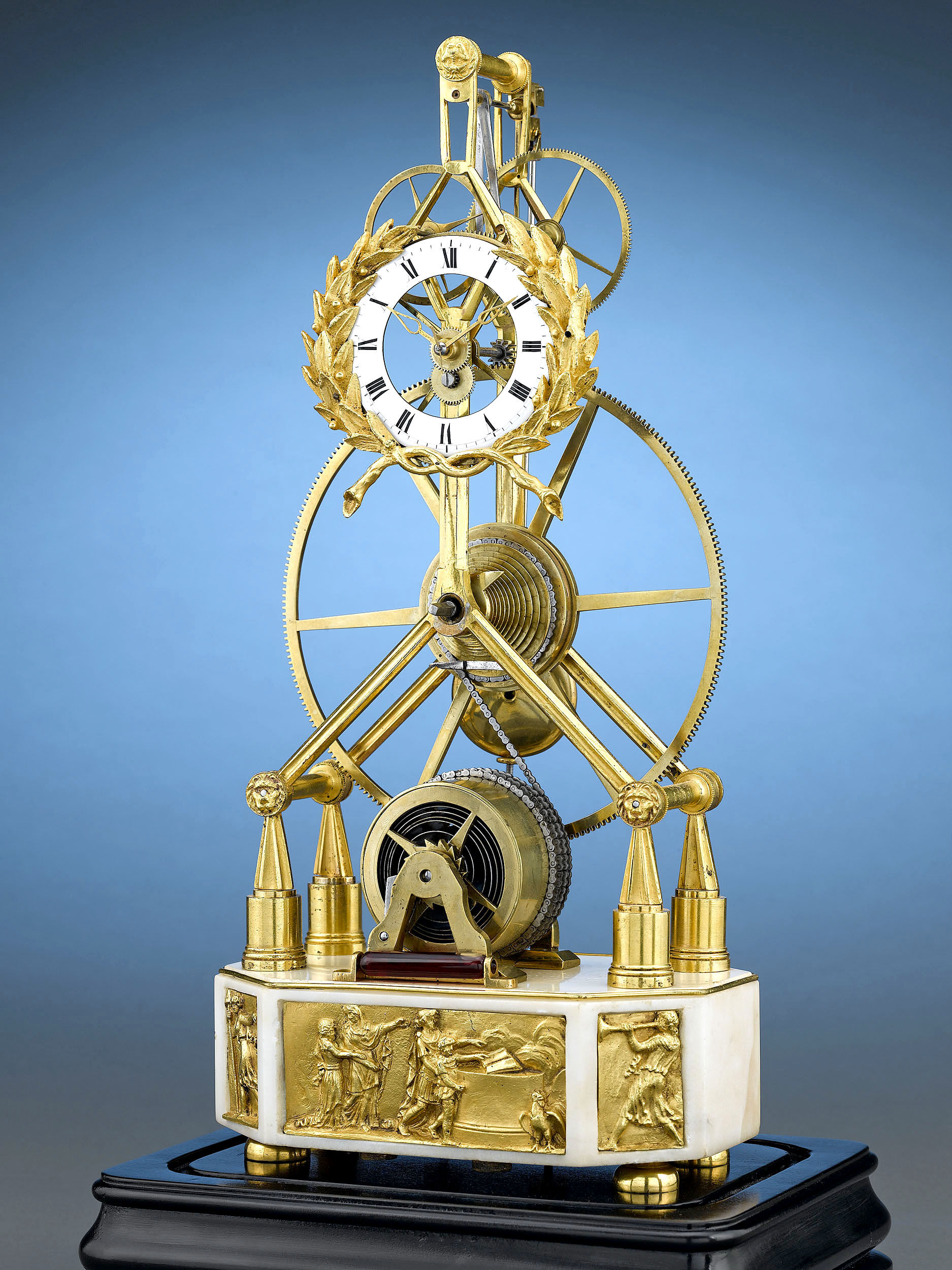
French Great Wheel Skeleton Clock. Circa 1840

In addition, several authors have published construction manuals on skeleton clocks in clockmaking and model engineering journals in the UK and USA, several of which (UK) have ceased operations. However, the best known of these authors had the manuals reprinted in comb bound format and these are still available (2012). John Wilding in the UK wrote manuals on Large Wheel, Elegant Scroll Frame, Chrystal Wheel and Scissors. Bill Smith in the US wrote on Lyre, Grasshopper and Epicyclic skeleton clocks.

The nomenclature for skeleton clocks is somewhat different from for cased clocks. For example, part of the brass framework of a tall clock is called a plate, whereas for skeletons, it is called a frame.

Frames of British skeleton clocks are listed by Roberts: Rafter (Including inverted “Y” frame), Gothic, Scroll (including lyre), Floral (ivy leaf and arabesque) and Architectural.

The photos are of some relatively simple commercial skeleton clocks with architectural frames, specifically of cathedrals in Great Britain: Litchfield and York Minster. The last is based on the Royal Pavilion in Brighton, England. Maker is unknown, all have passing strike.

France: Rafter (especially inverted “Y” a typical French design), Glass and Keyhole (Roberts’ term) as well as ornate designs.

The escapement of a skeleton clock is typically different from one used in a tall case, mantle and wall clock. In Great Britain, anchor (recoil), dead beat, balance wheel and tic tac. In France, pinwheel, coup perdu, (both dead beat), crossbeat or variant of Dutretre’s escapement.

The motive power is typically with a spring and, in Britain Fusee, or, in France, a going barrel although weight-driven clocks were made in these small sizes with durations up to a month usually with two weights wound around the same barrel. British clocks sometimes used a Remontoire to power the strike. Tall case clocks most often had a time and strike train, later a chime train was added. A skeleton clock would utilize a passing strike that struck just once on the hour.

Nowadays the term skeleton clock is also used to describe modern skeleton clocks for placement on a wall. Unlike the 18th century skeleton clocks, most of those contemporary timepieces are powered by the battery-operated quartz mechanism. The quartz movement used is a mass produced, low-cost plastic mechanism of no decorative value. It is disguised within the clock’s body, its skeleton design expressed in the open form of the clock face. Modern skeleton wall clocks have no visible back-plate; the wall background can be seen between the numbers or framework. A majority of the timepieces have minimalist design that can be easily manufactured on a large scale; this makes them inexpensive and popular.

Higher valued timepieces with artistic value are usually handmade of wood or wrought iron.
