= 2018 Nizam's Museum heist =

Museum heist in Hyderabad, India

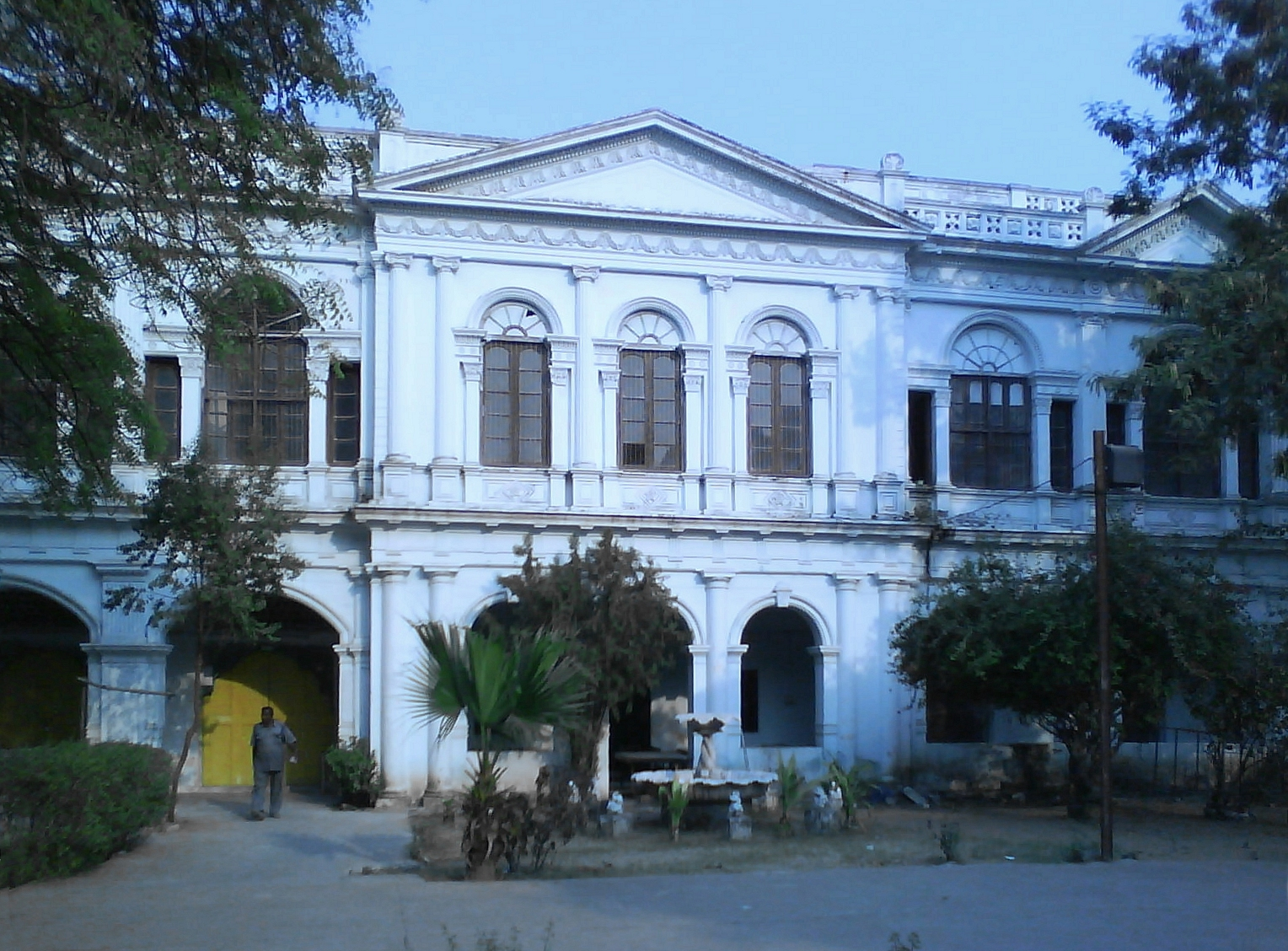
- The Nizam's Museum
- Date: 2–3 September 2018
- Venue: The Nizam's Museum, Purani Haveli
- Location: Hyderabad, India
- Also known as: The Hyderabad Heist
- Type: Museum heist
- Motive: Theft of antique gold artefacts worth up to ₹500 crore (US$73.11 million)
- Perpetrators: Mohammad Ghouse Pasha (alias Khooni Ghouse), Mohammed Mubeen
- Outcome: Both culprits caught and convicted, All stolen artefacts recovered
- Sentence: Two years of imprisonment

A high-profile theft occurred on the night of 2 September 2018 at the Nizam's Museum in Purani Haveli, Hyderabad, India. Two burglars, Mohammad Ghouse Pasha (alias Khooni Ghouse) and Mohammed Mubeen, broke into the museum and stole priceless artefacts belonging to the seventh Nizam of Hyderabad, included a gold tiffin box, a cup, saucer, and spoon all made of solid gold and inlaid with diamonds, rubies, and emeralds. The collection of stolen items was estimated to be worth up to ₹500 crore (US$73.11 million) in the antique black market, with the tiffin box alone being worth over ₹100 crore ($14.62 million). The incident remains one of India's most audacious museum thefts.

== Background ==
The Nizam's Museum in Hyderabad is located in the historic Purani Haveli palace of the former princely state of Hyderabad, and is administered by the Nizam's Jubilee Pavilion Trust. Its collection comprises personal belongings of the Nizams of Hyderabad, including gifts presented to Mir Osman Ali Khan to commemorate his silver jubilee in 1936. Its collection includes gold and silver artefacts, diamond-studded antiques, rare books, and a manually operated elevator over 150 years old. The museum's collection is considered culturally and historically significant, representing both the wealth of the Nizam's era and the heritage of the Hyderabad region. On the night of 2–3 September 2018, thieves broke into the museum's third gallery, entered via a ventilator vent on the first floor, removed the iron grille of the vent, and used a rope to drop into the room below where jewels and other antiques were on display. The theft was discovered the following morning when guards found a broken showcase lock and several items missing.

According to police statements, the stolen items included:

- a gold tiffin box (three-tier) weighing 1,950g studded with diamonds, rubies, and emeralds
- a gold cup and saucer weighing 172g set studded with gemstones
- a gold teaspoon

Beyond their monetary value in the antique market, the items were a testimony to the wealth of the richest man in the world at that time.

== Heist ==
=== Execution of the Heist ===
Over a month prior to the burglary, the perpetrators Ghouse Pasha and Mubeen scouted the museum multiple times, observing the positions of CCTV cameras and guards. They also managed to obtain information that the CCTV camera recordings are retained for only thirty days. To ensure that the camera footage of their reconnaissance visits to the museum were unavailable for the subsequent police investigation, they waited 45 days for the actual burglary. On their final visit prior to the burglary, the culprits–both skilled in masonry and welding–had secretly marked the exact ventilator through which they planned to enter by painting a small directional arrow on the inner wall. The ventilator, located on the first floor, was small–about two feet wide–and covered with an iron grille. The arrow marking later helped them identify which one of the 28 identical ventilators to break-in through at night.

On the day of the burglary, they dismantled the iron grille using hacksaws, screwdrivers, and pliers. To ensure no one suspected tampering, Ghouse Pasha later used his masonry skills to re-plaster the damaged section of the ventilator, giving the appearance that it was intact and untouched. During the operation, Mubeen used a rope with several knots for grip and descended through the shaft while Ghouse Pasha secured the rope from above. Inside, Mubeen disabled the CCTV camera situated below the opening, pried open a glass showcase, and extracted the 2kg gold tiffin box, the gold cup and saucer, and the gold spoon studded with diamonds, rubies, and emeralds.

After hastily packing the loot into a cloth bag, the thieves left through the same route, locked the ventilator grille back into place and covered the damaged edges with skimmed plaster. The museum guards, who were on duty outside, did not register any disturbance.

=== Attempts to mislead police ===
After the theft, the burglars escaped on a motorcycle, deliberately choosing by-lanes and narrow alleys to avoid CCTV tracking. Despite their efforts to evade cameras, they were eventually spotted on the CCTV footage of a local mosque. Mubeen, seated as pillion, was observed speaking on his mobile phone in surveillance footage, prompting police to deploy 22 teams to scan over 300 cell towers to trace the calls. However, the calls were fake–a deliberate ruse to mislead investigators into believing that the culprits were contacting either a third accomplice or a pre-arranged buyer. In reality, Mubeen's phone was inactive and without a SIM card, and he merely held it to his ear to confuse the police. Holding the mobile phone against his head also allowed Mubeen to hide his face from cameras in an inconspicuous manner while driving through the by-lanes of the city.

=== Burying the loot ===
The duo initially considered fleeing to Nepal but later decided to head to Mumbai with the hope of finding an overseas buyer in Mumbai. While en route to Mumbai, they stopped and changed routes near Muthangi on the outskirts of Hyderabad. Fearing getting caught with the artefacts in their possession, they decided not to carry all the items with them. They turned back toward Hyderabad and decided to bury the tiffin box, and the cup and saucer set inside a pit near a dairy farm in Rajendranagar, a suburban area with sparse habitation. They kept the gold spoon with them with the intent to use it as evidence to show potential buyers that they were indeed in possession of the artefacts.

=== Escape to Mumbai and return to Hyderabad ===
After burying the stolen items in Hyderabad, Ghouse Pasha and Mubeen started driving towards Mumbai. When their bike broke down near Zaheerabad, they abandoned it in some bushes near the highway and used public transport to travel to Mumbai. They checked into a luxury hotel in South Mumbai to lay low for a few days and avoid detection by the Hyderabad Police. Mubeen, who had previously worked in Saudi Arabia, attempted to find an oversees buyer for the stolen items but was unsuccessful. Upon realising that their high-profile theft had made national news, the duo abandoned their plan to sell the artefacts in Mumbai and returned to Hyderabad. Over the next few days, they focused their efforts on evading the Police Task Force by moving across several locations within Hyderabad's Old City area but were subsequently identified and arrested.

== Investigation and recovery ==
=== Early leads and CCTV footage ===
The Hyderabad City Police formed twenty special teams under the East Zone Task Force and the Mir Chowk Police jurisdiction to track down the culprits. Anjani Kumar, who was Commissioner of Police, Hyderabad at the time, personally led the investigation. CCTV footage from the Masjid-e-Asna-e-Ashri mosque near the Nizam's Museum captured two masked men wearing gloves leaving on a Bajaj Pulsar motorcycle, which became a crucial lead. Since the registration plate of the motorcycle had been removed, the police had to set up additional teams to parse through hours of CCTV footage from over a hundred other cameras in the vicinity. Eventually, the same Pulsar motorcycle was spotted in footage from other cameras. The police used facial recognition from the camera footage to identify Mohammad Ghouse Pasha (alias Khooni Ghouse), who had a prior criminal record for his alleged involvement in a murder case. The police, who were aware of Ghouse's prior employment history as a mason, were able to further corroborate his involvement in the crime due to the discovery of skilled masonry work on the ventilator grille at the crime scene. All the police stations in Hyderabad were issued a look-out notice for Ghouse, along with information being passed on to the respective police departments of other major cities like Mumbai, Delhi, and Bengaluru. However, the second suspect's identity was still unknown due to Mubeen being a first-time offender and not having a prior criminal record, and also due to his face being partially covered by his mobile phone in most of the CCTV footage.

The police used CCTV footage from other locations in the city to retrace the suspects' movements towards Muthangi and found the Pulsar motorcycle broken-down and abandoned in Zaheerabad along the Hyderabad-Mumbai Highway NH 65. The motorcycle was an old model bought without proper documentation.

=== Forensic and physical clues ===
Forensic teams found fresh cement dust and gloved finger impressions near the ventilator, consistent with the suspects' prior experience in masonry work. The rope left behind was traced to a hardware shop in the Mir Chowk area, where CCTV footage identified one of the buyers as Ghouse Pasha. This evidence was used to link the suspects directly to the break-in.

=== Arrest and recovery of items ===
Through local intelligence, police learned that two men from the Rajendranagar area had suddenly left Hyderabad after the incident. These individuals were traced to a hotel in Mumbai, where they allegedly used the hotel phones to contact potential buyers for the artefacts. Using call-detail analysis from hotel staff and CCTV footage near the hotel, police were able to identify both Ghouse Pasha and Mubeen. However, both the suspects had already left the hotel before the police could nab them in Mumbai. In anticipation of their return to Hyderabad, the Hyderabad Police set up surveillance teams comprising officers in civilian clothes in the vicinity of Ghouse Pasha's house in Rajendranagar.

On 11 September 2018, eight days after the heist, the police surveillance team identified and arrested Ghouse Pasha and Mubeen at the Aramghar Cross Road. During interrogation, the accused confessed to stealing the artefacts and revealed the location of the pit where the stolen items were buried. Police dug up the spot and recovered all items wrapped in plastic covers. The buried artefacts were confirmed as genuine by the Nizam's Jubilee Pavilion Trust. The police handed over the recovered items to the local court which subsequently returned them to the Nizam's Museum.

== Trial and conviction ==
Following their arrest, the two men were taken to the Mir Chowk Police Station where they were charged under multiple sections of the Indian Penal Code, including house-breaking and theft of property from a museum. On 11 February 2020, a Hyderabad court found both guilty and sentenced them to two years of imprisonment with fines imposed for the museum break-in and theft.

Khooni Ghouse was released from prison in August 2020 upon completion of his prison sentence. However, he was arrested once again on 22 March 2021 after committing multiple acts of theft and burglary. During his March 2021 arrest, the police recovered stolen property worth ₹25 lakh ($36,500) and a knife from Khooni Ghouse.

== Aftermath ==
=== News coverage and calls for improving museum security ===
The heist was one of the most notable museum thefts in modern Indian history, involving priceless royal heirlooms of the Nizam of Hyderabad. The combination of meticulous planning, masonry skills, and unusual behaviour–such as the thief using the stolen gold tiffin box to eat meals and burying the treasure near a dairy farm–made it a widely discussed case in both national and international media. The case also raised concerns about the security of cultural artefacts in Indian museums. The Telangana Police recommended improved surveillance systems, motion sensors, and upgraded alarm systems for museums. The Nizam's Museum temporarily closed to the public for a security audit after the incident.

=== Appreciation for the police investigation ===
The Hyderabad City Police were widely commended for their swift and meticulous investigation. Acting through multiple task-force units, they quickly analyzed hours of CCTV footage in a distributed manner, traced physical and forensic clues, and coordinated across state lines to track the suspects' movements. Remarkably, the police cracked the complex case and recovered the stolen artefacts within just eight days of the theft–a rare outcome given that most jewellery or art heists from museums across the world remain unsolved for years. During a press briefing after the recovery of the stolen artefacts, Hyderabad Police Commissioner Anjani Kumar described the case as being about "more than just the recovery of gold". He said it represented an effort to restore a part of Hyderabad's history and legacy, as the stolen objects were priceless symbols of the city's royal past. Kumar noted that the successful investigation reaffirmed the police department's commitment to protecting the cultural heritage of Hyderabad and preserving a legacy of the Nizams for future generations.

On 28 December 2018, the artefacts were returned to the Nizam's Museum in the presence of Prince Muffakham Jah, who serves as the President of the Nizam's Jubilee Pavilion Trust and is the grandson of the seventh Nizam Nawab Mir Osman Ali Khan. During the ceremony, Prince Muffakham Jah praised the efficiency of the Hyderabad City Police and stated that "such a quick positive outcome would not have been possible in many countries".

=== Documentary Film and Literature based on the heist ===
A book titled The Hyderabad Heist: The Untold Story of India's Buggest Museum Theft by Sharmishtha Shenoy provides a detailed narrative of the incident, chornicling both the audacious break-in and the fast-paced investigation that followed. A documentary titled Heist of Hyderabad (2025), which was released on platforms such as Prime Video and Apple TV, revisits the case through archival footage, interviews with key investigators including Police Commissioner Anjani Kumar, and dramatized re-enactments, highlighting how cultural heritage almost vanished and was then swiftly recovered.
