= City Museum, Hyderabad =

Museum in Hyderabad, India

City Museum
- Established: 11 March 2012
- Location: Purani Haveli, Hyderabad, Telangana, India

City Museum is a museum located in Hyderabad, India, situated in the palace Purani Haveli.

== History ==
The museum was inaugurated on 11 March 2012 by Nizam's Jubilee Pavilion Trust chairman, Prince Muffakham Jah, the grandson of the last ruler of Hyderabad state Mir Osman Ali Khan.

== The Museum ==
The museum houses neolithic pots, megalithic sites, European styled terracotta figurines, coins of Satvahana period among others.
