= Satlada =

Indian pearl necklace

Satlada is a seven-stringed pearl necklace of Indian origin. It traditionally has 465 pearls embedded in it. It can also be set with emeralds, diamonds and rubies.

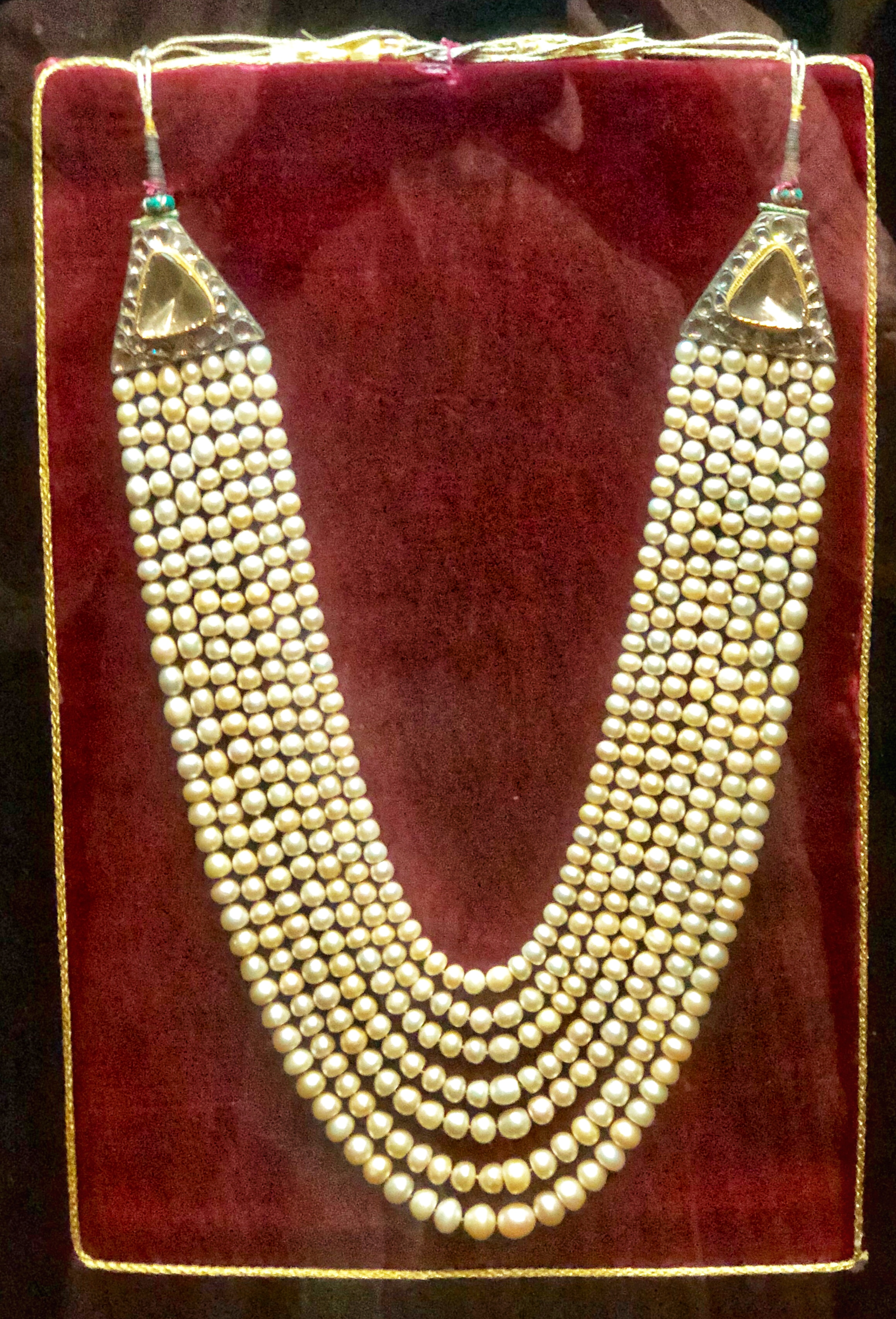
Made in Basra, Iraq for the Nizams of Hyderabad

Some of the pearls are so large they look like small eggs, or outsized peas. Formerly mainly used in royal families, it is today often chosen as wedding jewelry.

== See also ==
- Jewels of The Nizams
- Jacob Diamond
- Darya-e Nur
