= Magnanimous =

- An adjective referring to magnanimity
  - an epithet, used for various rulers
- Magnanimous Records, a United States record label

== See also ==
- A magnanimous act, a 1782 prose work by Friedrich Schiller
