= Nawab Mir Khudrath Nawaz Jung Bahadur =

Nawab Mir Khudrath Nawaz Jung Bahadur was the commander of Osman Ali Khan, Nizam of Hyderabad's irregular forces.
