= Purani Haveli =

Coordinates: 17.365507°N 78.482675°E

Purani Haveli-(Msarrat Mahal palace)
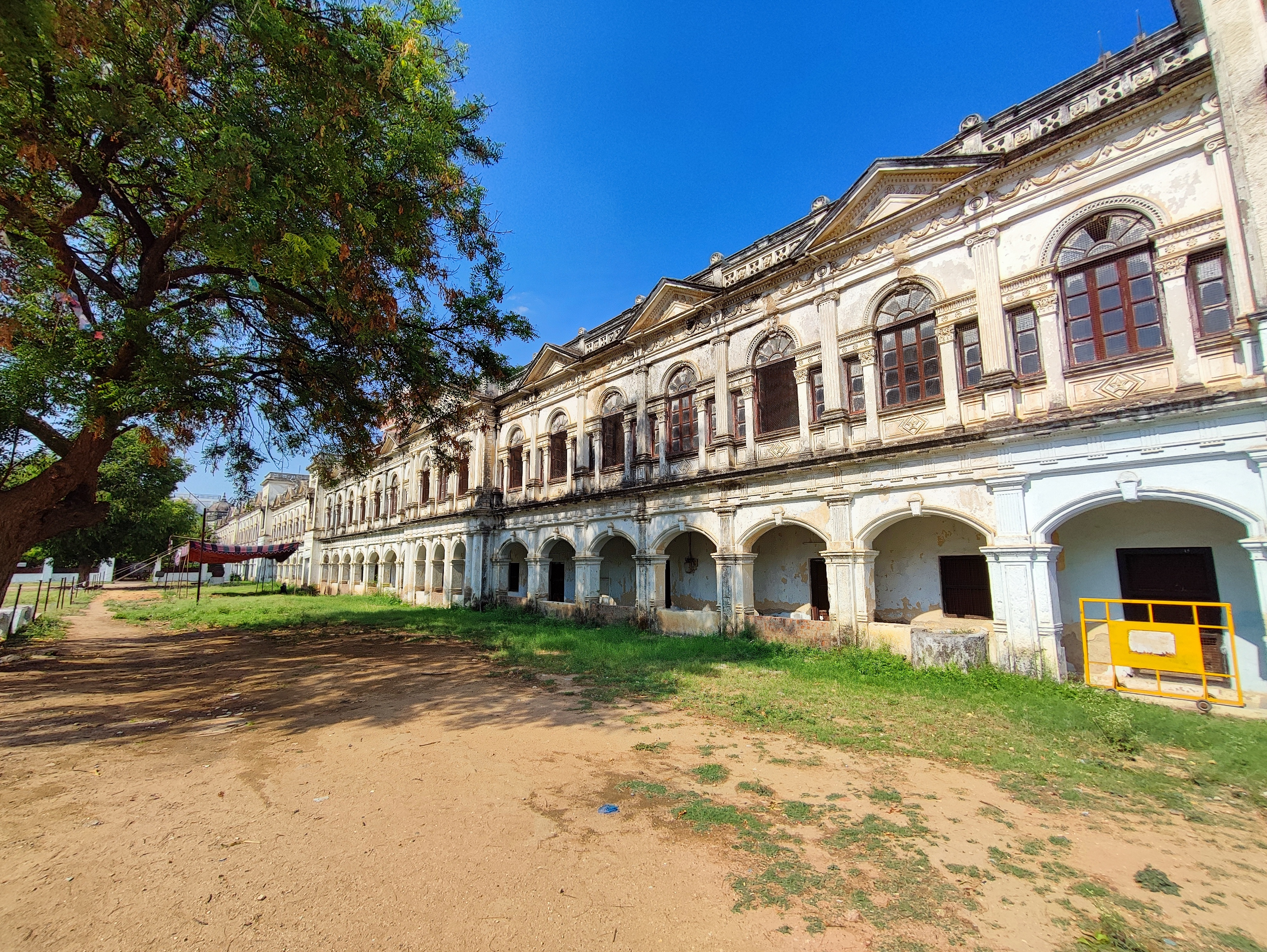
- Interactive map of the Purani Haveli-(Msarrat Mahal palace) area

General information
- Type: Royal Palace
- Location: Old City, Hyderabad, Telangana, India
- Current tenants: The Nizam's Museum; City Museum
- Completed: 1577; 449 years ago

Purani Haveli, also known as Masarrat Mahal palace, is a Haveli located in Hyderabad, Telangana, India. It was the official residence of the Nizam of Hyderabad State. Also known as Haveli Kadeem, which means old mansion, it was constructed for Sikander Jah, Asaf Jah III (1803–1829) by his father Ali Khan Bahadur, Asaf Jah II.

== History ==
The second Nizam of Hyderabad, Mir Nizam Ali Khan had taken over this from Nawab Rukn-ud-Daula, of the Momin lineage, in 1717. The main building is a symbol of 18th-century European architecture. His son and successor Sikander Jah lived here for some time and later shifted to Chowmahalla Palace. Due to this, the building is called Purani Haveli. Ayina Khaana (Mirror House) and Chini Khaana (Chinese Glass House) were constructed in this building complex.

The sixth and seventh Nizams were born in this palace, and spent a part of their life at this palace.

In September 2018, the palace received extensive media coverage when it because the site of the 2018 Nizam's Museum heist.

The palace currently houses the South Zone Deputy Commissioner of Police (DCP) (Hyderabad) and South Zone Task Force Additional DCP offices.

== The Palace ==
The Haveli is "U" in shape, with two oblong wings running parallel to each other and the residential palace located perpendicularly in the centre. The main building resembles 18th-century European palaces. A unique feature of this palace is the world's longest wardrobe, built in two levels with a hand-cranked wooden lift (elevator) in place. This occupies the entire length of one oblong wing of the palace.

== The Museum ==
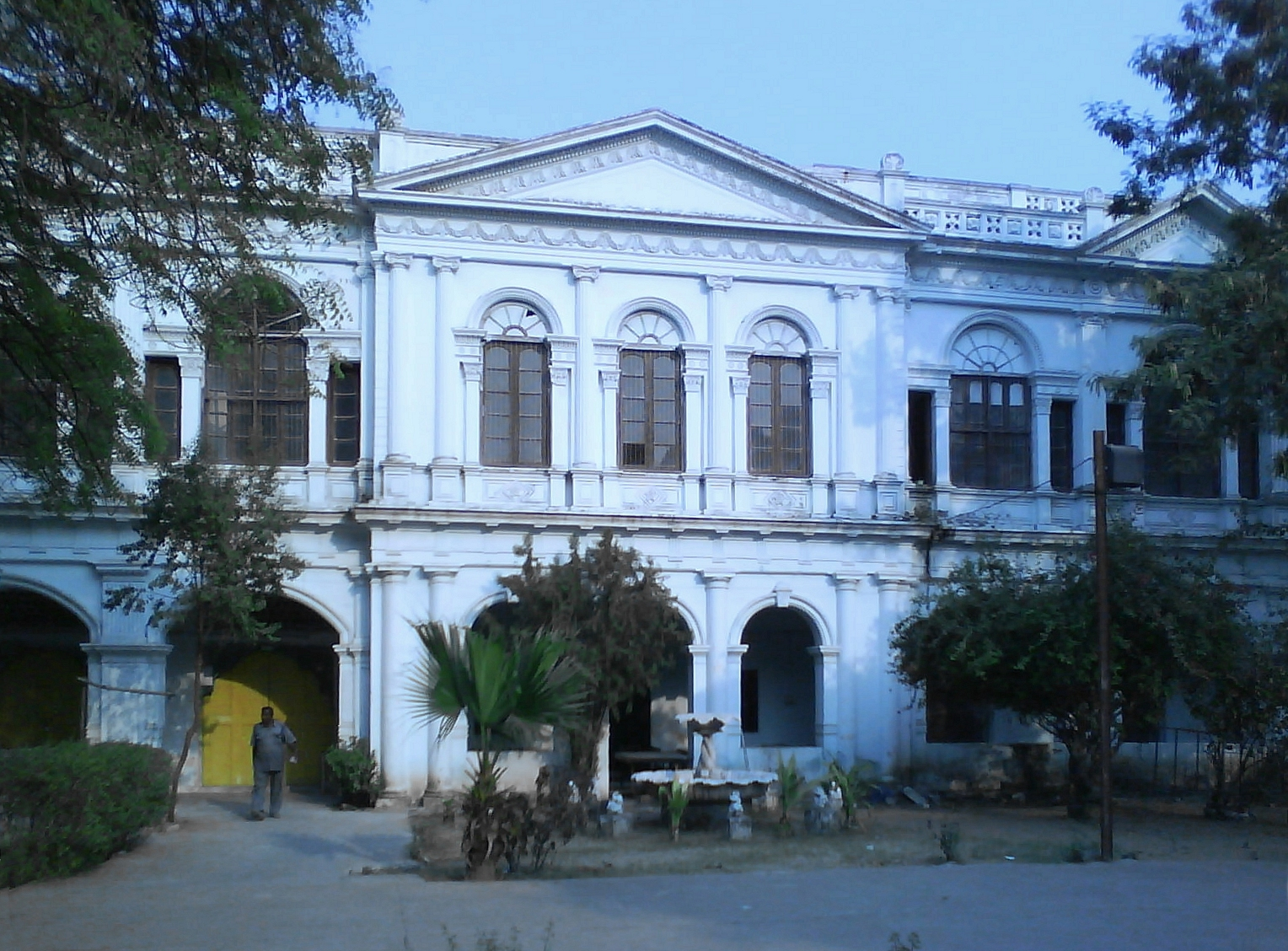
The Nizam's Museum located in the palace

The palace also houses the The Nizam's Museum, which is dedicated to the last Nizam of Hyderabad state. Currently the palace is being used as a school and as an Industrial training institute.

== School ==
The Mukarram Jah School was established on the premises in 1987. It functions from five ancillary buildings which surround the main palace. It is a private school and it was ranked among the best budget private schools in the country.

== See also ==
- Chowmahalla Palace
- Nizam Palace (Kolkata)
- Taramati Baradari
- Establishments in Hyderabad State
- Asaf Jahi dynasty – Muslim dynasty that ruled the Hyderabad State of India from 1734 to 1948
