= Hyderabad Aero Club =

Hyderabad State Aero Club was an airport club in the Hyderabad State, India. It became the airfield for the VII Nizam of Hyderabad, Mir Osman Ali Khan's aircraft. The club hosted the first-ever air show at the Begumpet airport in the year 1937.

== History ==
The club started in 1936. Air transportation in Hyderabad got a flying start when the first air show was hosted in 1937 by the Hyderabad State Aero Club and caught the eye of the VII Nizam. The foundation for the terminal building was laid by Princess Durrushevar in November 1936. The Hyderabad Aero Club was formed, and it became the airfield for Nizam of Hyderabad's aircraft. The club had 70 members in 1938 and offered four cross-country flights.

The second airport was further built with the provision of a proper airport terminal building in 1937, after realizing the need for a full-fledged airport for Hyderabad.
