= Jewels of the Nizams of Hyderabad =

Indian jewellery collection

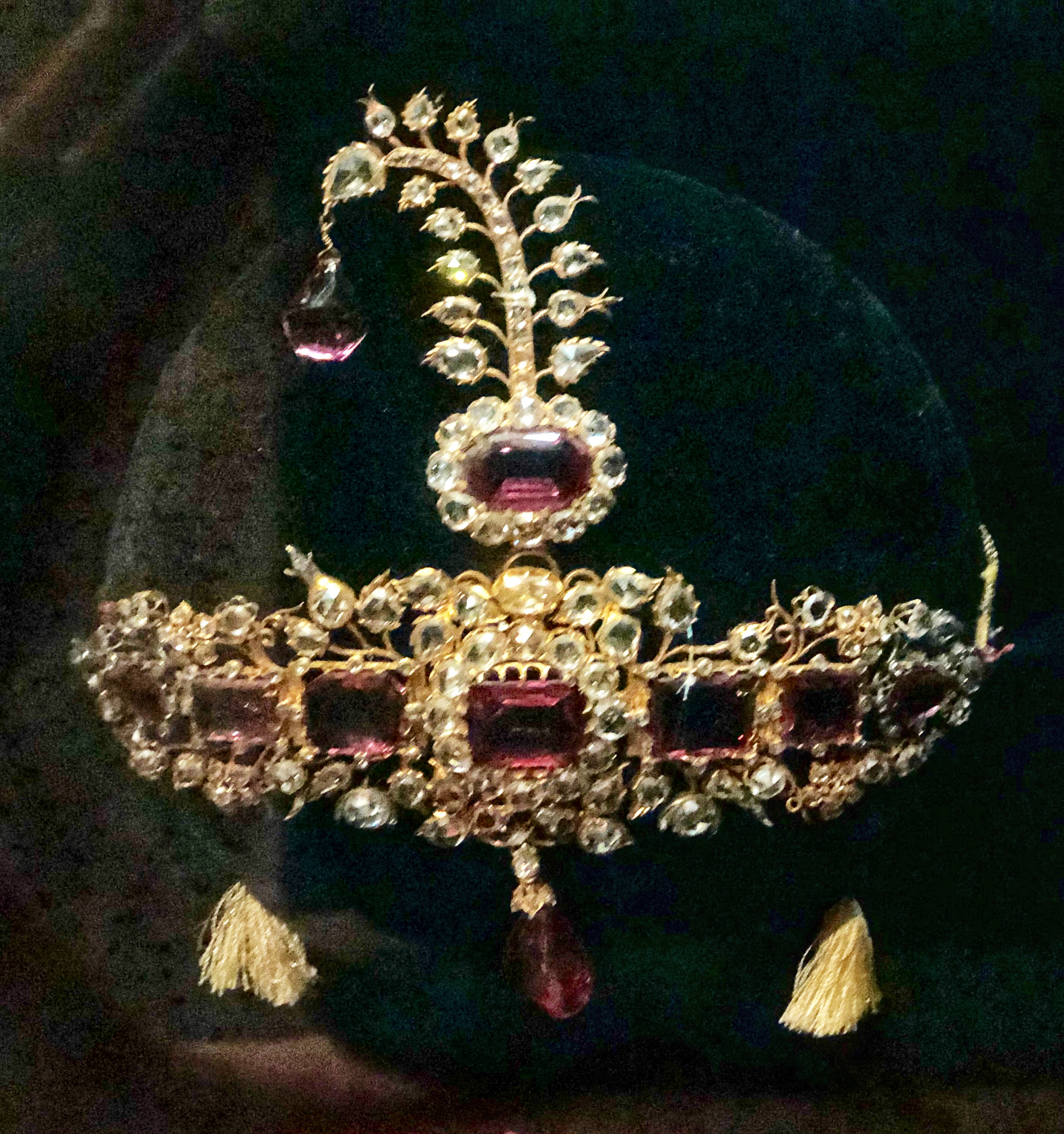
A decorative crown for the Nizam's of Hyderabad

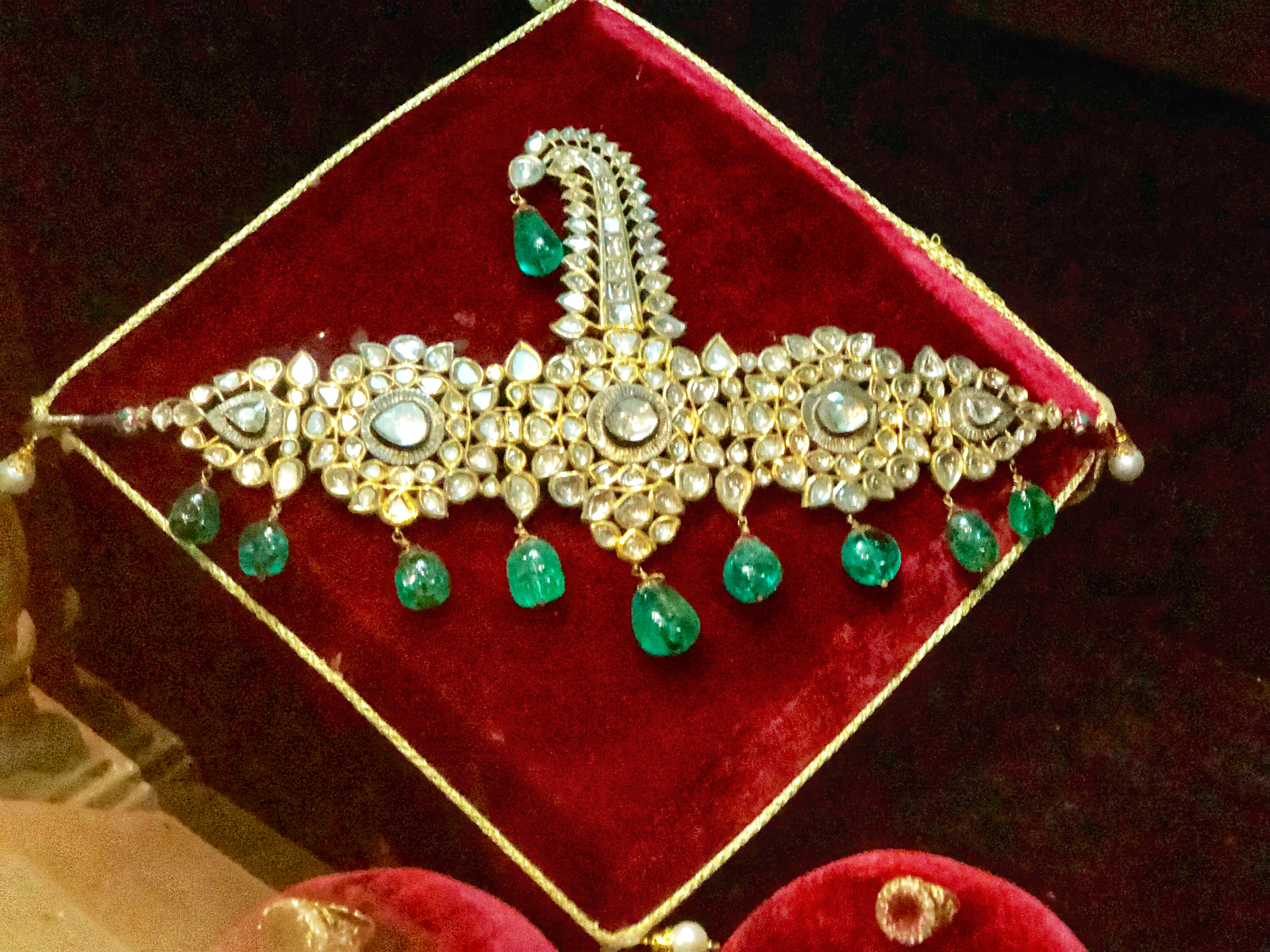
A crown that forms part of the Jewels

The Jewels of the Nizams of Hyderabad State are among the largest and most expensive collection of jewels in present-day India. The jewels belonged to the Nizams, rulers of Hyderabad State. After the annexation of their kingdom by Union of India, the Nizam and his heirs were barred by the Indian government from taking the collection, claiming that it was a national treasure. After much litigation, the Jacob Diamond was purchased by the Government of India from the Nizam's trust for an estimated $13 million in 1995, along with other jewels of the Nizams, and is held at the Reserve Bank of India vaults in Mumbai.

Once the Nizams' state regalia, the ornaments date from the early 18th century to the early 20th century. Crafted in gold and silver, with many embellished with enamelling, the jewels are set with gems including Colombian emeralds, diamonds from the Kollur Diamond Mine in Guntur district and the diamond mine in Krishna district (now Andhra Rayalaseema Diamond mines group), Burmese rubies and spinels, and pearls from Basra and the Gulf of Mannar.

There are 173 jewels, which includes diamonds and emeralds weighing nearly 2,000 carats (0.40 kg), and pearls exceeding 40,000 chows. The collection includes gemstones, turban ornaments, necklaces, pendants, belts, buckles, earrings, armbands, bangles, bracelets, anklets, cufflinks, buttons, watch chains, rings, toe rings and nose rings. Among them is the seven-stringed Basrah pearl necklace, known as Satlada, which has 465 pearls embedded in it. One of the prized possessions in the collection is the Jacob Diamond, the fifth largest diamond in the world and which weighs 184.75 carats. It had been kept a shoe at Chowmahalla Palace, and subsequently used as a paper weight for a long time.

== History of the jewels ==
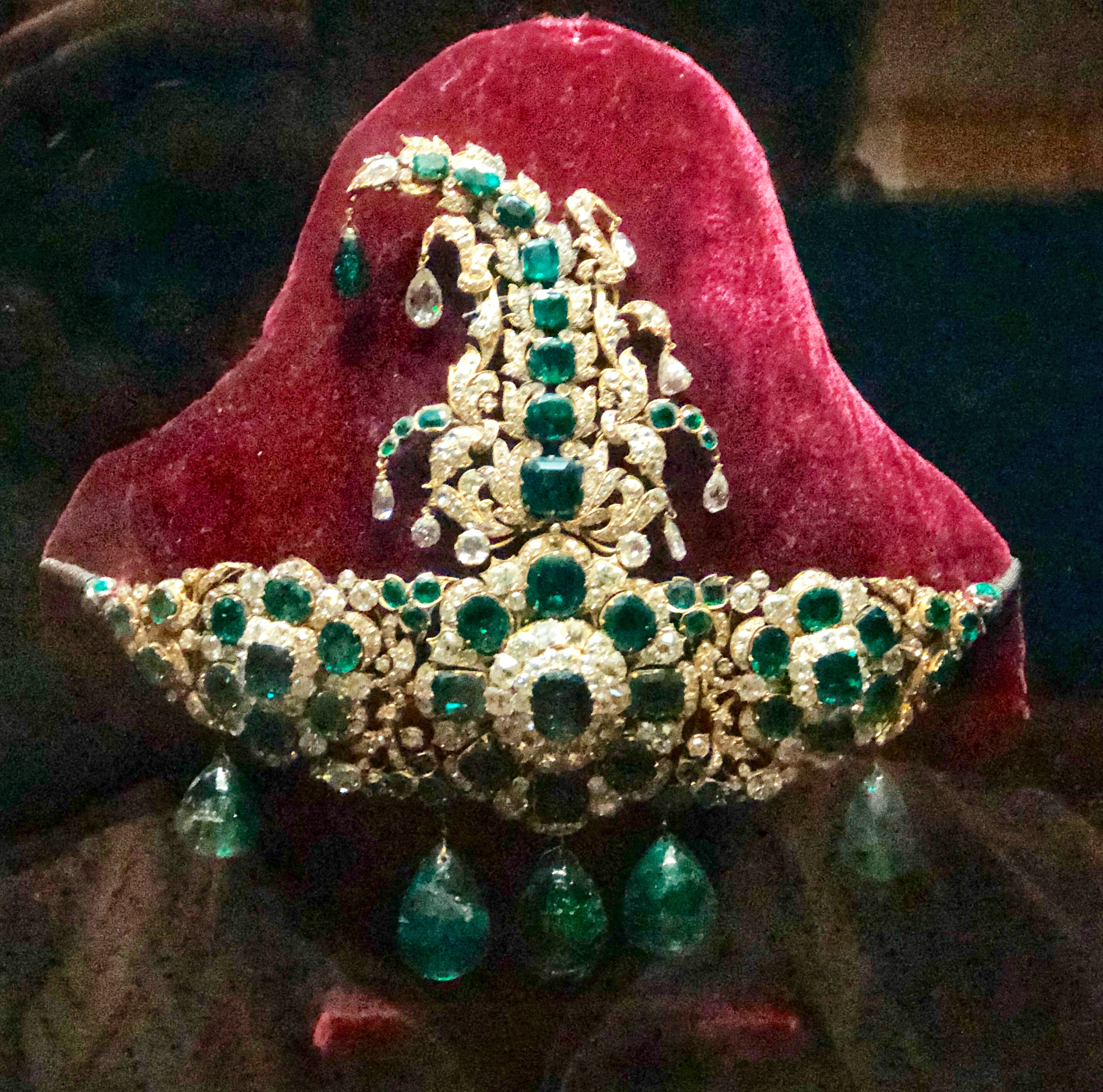
A decorative crown with studded Emeralds

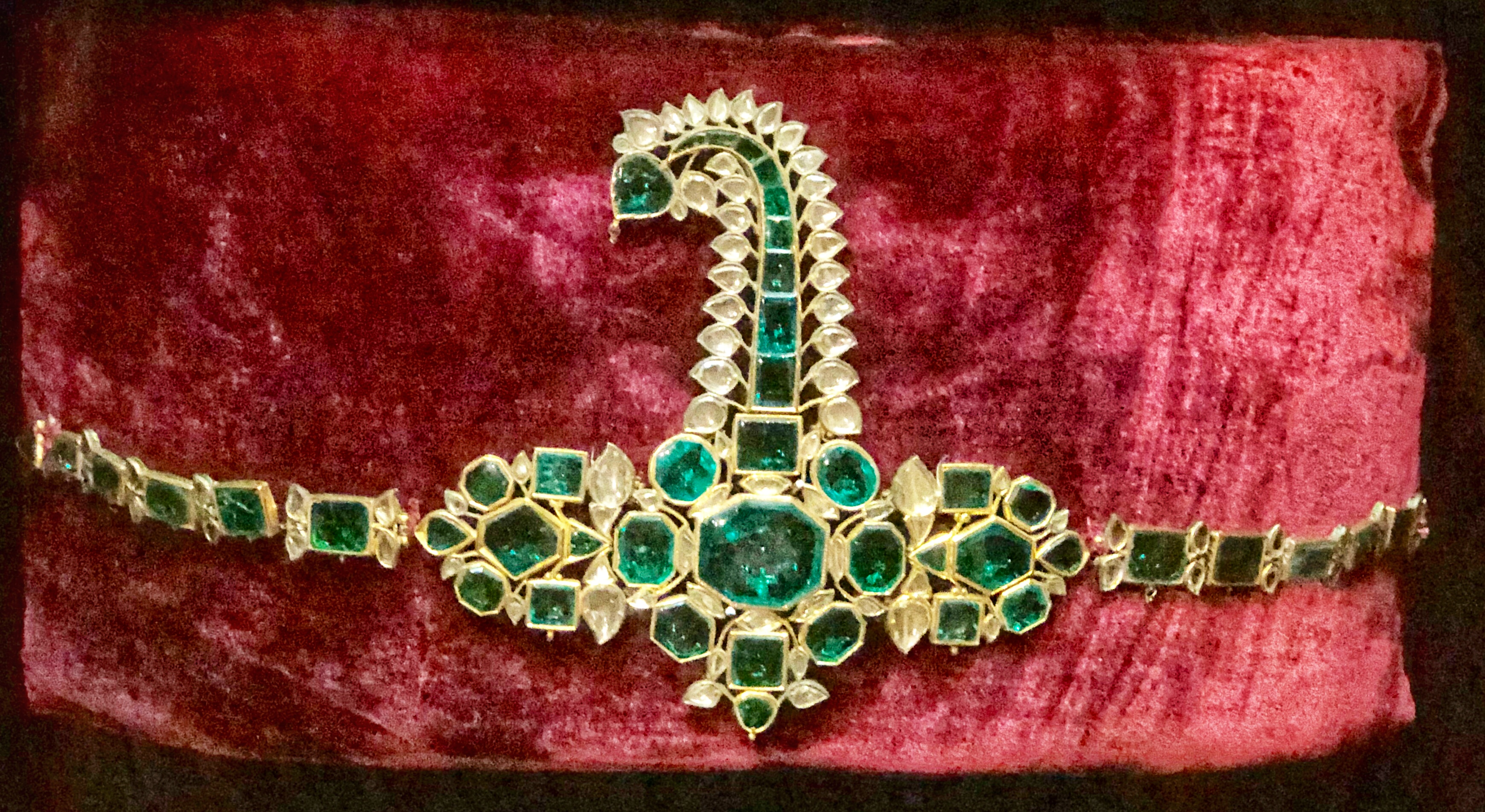
A decorative crown for the Nizam's of Hyderabad

In 1995, the Indian government bought the jewels for ₹218 crore (about US$70 million) many years after the death of the last Nizam of Hyderabad, Mir Osman Ali Khan, in 1967. The government tried to buy the collection for a mere amount of $25 million. Fifteen years later, India's Supreme Court finally fixed a price of about $65 million, much less than the estimate of $350 million by Sotheby's. The biggest largest share ($20 million) went to Nizam's 1st grandson Mukarram Jah.

The collection is with the Union Government and had been deposited in the vaults of the Reserve Bank of India in its headquarters at Mumbai. It has been showcased a few times in exhibitions; in 2001 and 2006 at the National Museum, New Delhi and the Salar Jung Museum, Hyderabad.

After the Government of India had initially declined to buy the jewels in 1970s, the Nizam's Jewellery Trust's officials intended to sell 37 out of 65 of the Nizam's jewels to Indian and foreign entities. However, princess Fatima Fouzia, granddaughter of the Nizam, intervened. She went to the Hyderabad City Civil Court and notified that neither all the trustees had agreed for the sale, nor the tender was publicised sufficiently at an international level so that the heirs would get the right price of the jewels.

It was followed by a series of court cases in Hyderabad High Court and Supreme court of India.

In early 1990s the jewels were to be auctioned to private parties for amount much lower than the actual value. Fatima Fouzia, mother of great grandson of Nizam Himayat Ali Mirza, had filed a petition to prevent the jewels from being sold to private parties.

Princes Muffakham Jah, Najaf Ali Khan, Dilshad Jah, Himayat Ali Mirza and other trustees of the Nizams Jewellery Trust handed over the jewellery to the government of India.

Nizam's great-grandson, Himayat Ali Mirza, said Nizam's exclusive jewels are among the most elegant collections in the world. He has recently urged the Prime Minister to relocate Nizam's Jewellery to Hyderabad by establishing a museum in the city.

Along with the Nizam's jewels are two Bari gold coins worth hundreds of crores. Himayat Ali Mirza has requested the central government to bring these coins, which were made in the Arabic script should be brought back to Hyderabad.

== See also ==
- List of diamonds
