= King Kothi Palace =

Palace in Hyderabad, India

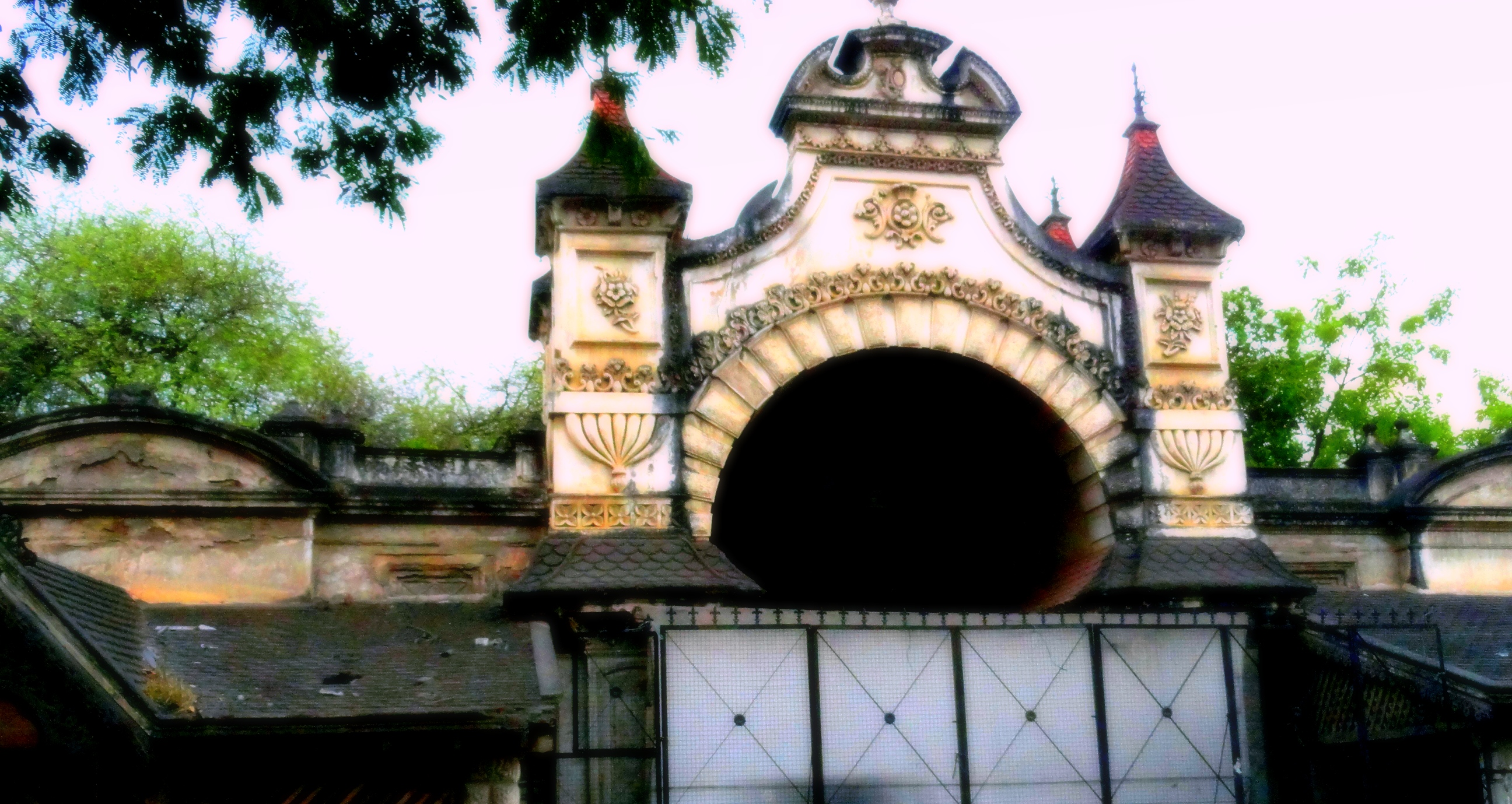
- Entrance gate of the King Kothi Palace
- Interactive map of the King Kothi Palace area

General information
- Status: Owned by the Nizam of Hyderabad
- Location: Hyderabad, Telangana State, India
- Opening: 1911; 115 years ago
- Owner: Nizam of Hyderabad

Design and construction
- Architect: Kamal Khan

King Kothi Palace or Nazri Bagh Palace is a royal palace in Hyderabad, Telangana, India. It was the palace where the erstwhile ruler of Hyderabad State, Sir Mir Osman Ali Khan, the seventh Nizam, lived. It was a palace bought by his father Mahboob Ali Pasha, who had a penchant for buying ostentatious homes.

== Etymology ==
Initially, this grand palace was owned by a noble, Kamal Khan who had his initials 'KK' imprinted on all the furniture, doors, crockery, windows and even on the iron grilles of the palace. Mahboob Ali Pasha was keen to possess the palace but the bold engravings of the initials made him a little wary. To his relief, a courtier came up with an excellent solution. He suggested that since a large house in Urdu is called "Kothi" and since it would be the King's Palace, it could be renamed as "King Kothi" justifying the initials. The Nizam was pleased and went ahead and bought the palace. Thus the name King Kothi came into existence.

== History ==
The palace was constructed by Kamal Khan, and sold to the Nizam once he expressed his desire for the palace. The young Nizam moved in when he was only 13. After his accession to the throne in 1911, he continued to stay at the palace and did not move to Chowmahalla Palace where his father lived.

In the sprawling palace, various kinds of expensive items were stored in steel trunks, fastened with English-made padlocks. The palace has three main buildings, divided into two groups. It also has a huge library used by the last Nizam.

The eastern half, now occupied by a state government hospital, was used by the Nizam for official and ceremonial purposes. The western half, which is now walled, has the main residential buildings known as Nazri Bagh or Mubarak Mansion and still belongs to the Nizam’s private estate.

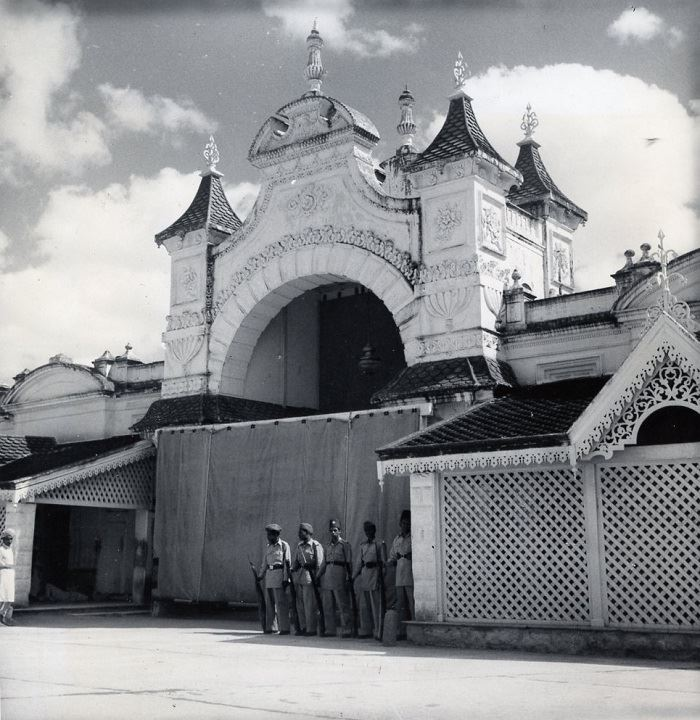
Soldiers from the Nizam's army guarding the Purdah gate of the King Kothi palace

The main entrance to Nazri Bagh always had a curtain draped across it, so it has come to be known as the purdah gate. When Nizam ventured out of the palace, the purdah was lifted to indicate the king was not home. The gate was guarded by Maisaram Regiment, police and Sarf-e-Khas Army bearing lances. The Nizam lived here until his death in 1967.

== Architecture ==
The palace is marked by large arched entrances and columns, intricate woodwork on canopied windows, and a large portico at the entrance.

== Present status ==
Of the three principal buildings of the King Kothi complex, only the main building (now housing a hospital) and the Mubarak Mansion (Nazri Bagh) accommodating the offices of the Nizam’s private estates (Sarf-e-Khas) survive. Both the surviving buildings are in European style.

The third building, Usman Mansion, was demolished in the early 1980s. In its place a new hospital building was constructed by the state government. The VII Nizam, Sir Mir Osman Ali Khan, the last ruling Nizam (1911–1948), lived here and died in this building on 24 February 1967.

The palace is also home to the Judi Mosque. Khan willed that he be buried in the mosque that faced his residence.

To the east of Mubarak Mansion stands the Ghadial Gate, the gate with a clock.

The King Kothi complex has various European styles. The canopies over windows, the intricate woodwork, the sloping tiled roofs in octagonal pyramid shapes of the Ghadial Gate complex, and the classical semicircular arches are among the characteristic features.

Himayat Ali Mirza, the great-grandson of the Nizam, stated that, the King Kothi palace was the accommodation of Mir Osman Ali khan for lifetime and is heartbreaking that the palace is of no use to public now. Himayat also suggested the conversion of King Kothi palace into a hospital.

Himayat said, "The palace is the last symbol of the great heritage of the last ruler of the Hyderabad state, and therefore government should preserve it instead of selling it. I will be filing a case in the High court seeking to stay the structure's demolition." Himayat also suggested a CBI investigation as there were multiple claims to the Nizam's property.
