= The Nizam's Museum =

Museum in Hyderabad, Telangana, India

Coordinates: 17.36649°N 78.48285°E

- Purani Haveli Museum; The Silver Jubliee Museum
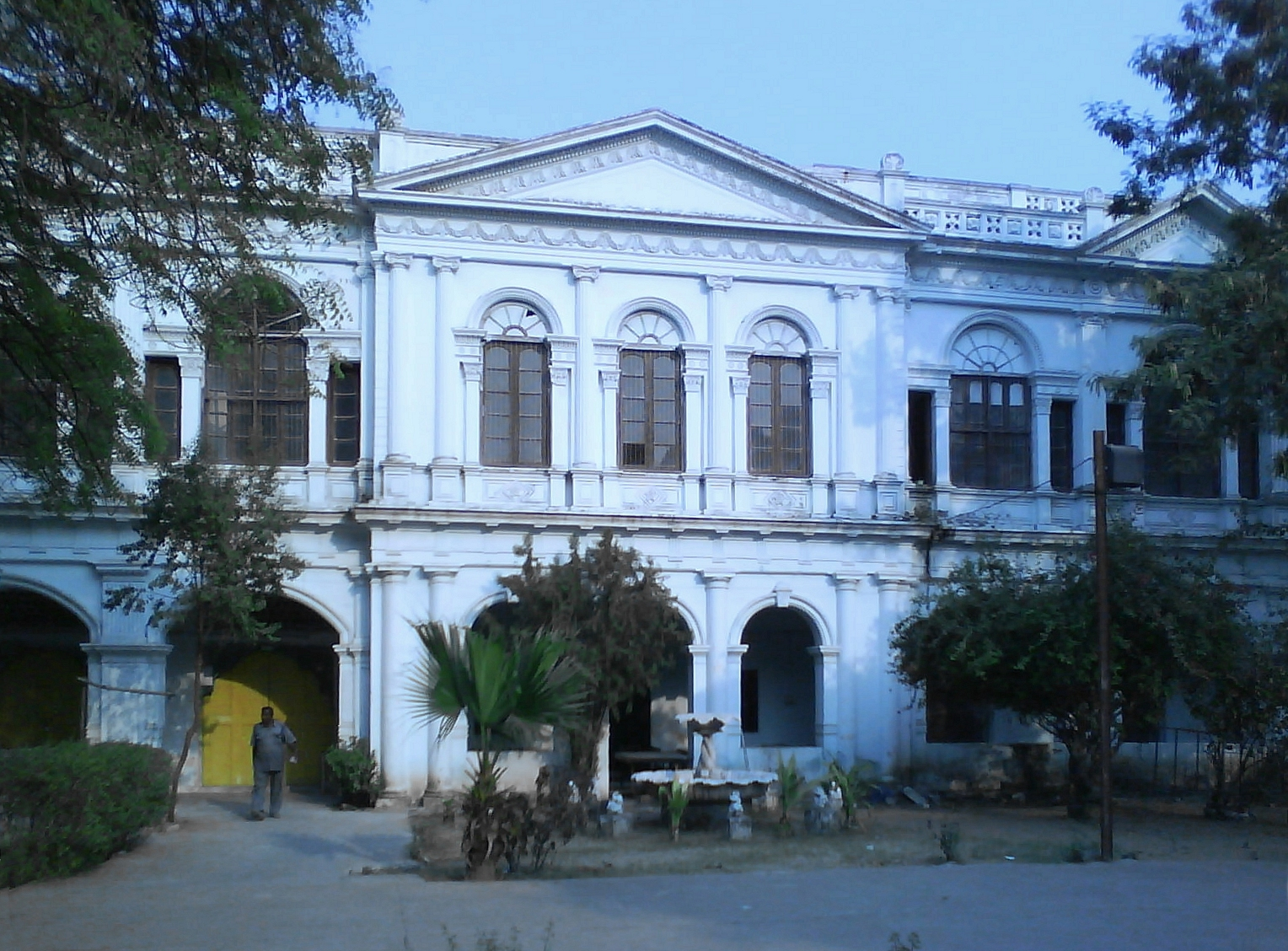
- The Nizam's Museum

- Location within Hyderabad Location within Telangana Location within India
- Established: February 18, 2000; 26 years ago
- Location: Purani Haveli, Hyderabad
- Type: General interest
- Collections: Paintings, daggers, swords, aeroplane models, artefacts, gifts, memorabilia
- Owner: The Nizam’s Jubilee Pavilion Trust
- Website: http://www.thenizamsmuseum.com/

The Nizam's Museum or H.E.H Nizam's Museum is a museum located in Hyderabad at Purani Haveli, a palace of the erstwhile Nizams. This museum showcases the gifts that the last Nizam of Hyderabad State, Osman Ali Khan, Asaf Jah VII received on his silver jubilee celebrations. The museum is a repository mainly of souvenirs, gifts and mementos presented by dignitaries to the last Nizam on the occasion of the silver jubilee celebrations in 1936. Models made of silver of all the landmark buildings in Hyderabad, with citations about them in Urdu.

== History ==
The museum was opened on 18 February 2000 by the Nizam Trust to the general public.

=== 2018 Theft of Gold Artefacts ===
This museum became part of international news in September 2018 when two thieves managed to steal several gold artefacts studded with diamonds, rubies, and emeralds by breaking into the museum at night. Both culprits were caught by the police the following week and security at the museum was beefed up after the incident.

== Collections ==
A golden throne used for the silver jubilee celebrations of the last Nizam, a gold tiffin box inlaid with diamonds, miniature replica of the Jubilee Hall, glass inlaid painting of Mir Osman Ali Khan, a wooden writing box studded with mother-of-pearl, diamonds and other precious stone studded golden daggers, caskets, and silver ittardans (perfume containers) presented by the Raja of Palvancha, Silver coffee cups studded with diamonds and silver filigree elephant with mahout, replica made of silver of a tree with Lord Krishna playing are on display.

A 1930 Rolls-Royce, Packard and a Jaguar Mark V are among the vintage cars on display.

The museum also features the wardrobe of the sixth nizam which was also the world's biggest (176 ft long) or largest walk through wardrobe and is one of its kind, a 150-year-old manually operated lift, and 200-year-old proclamation drums.

== Gallery ==
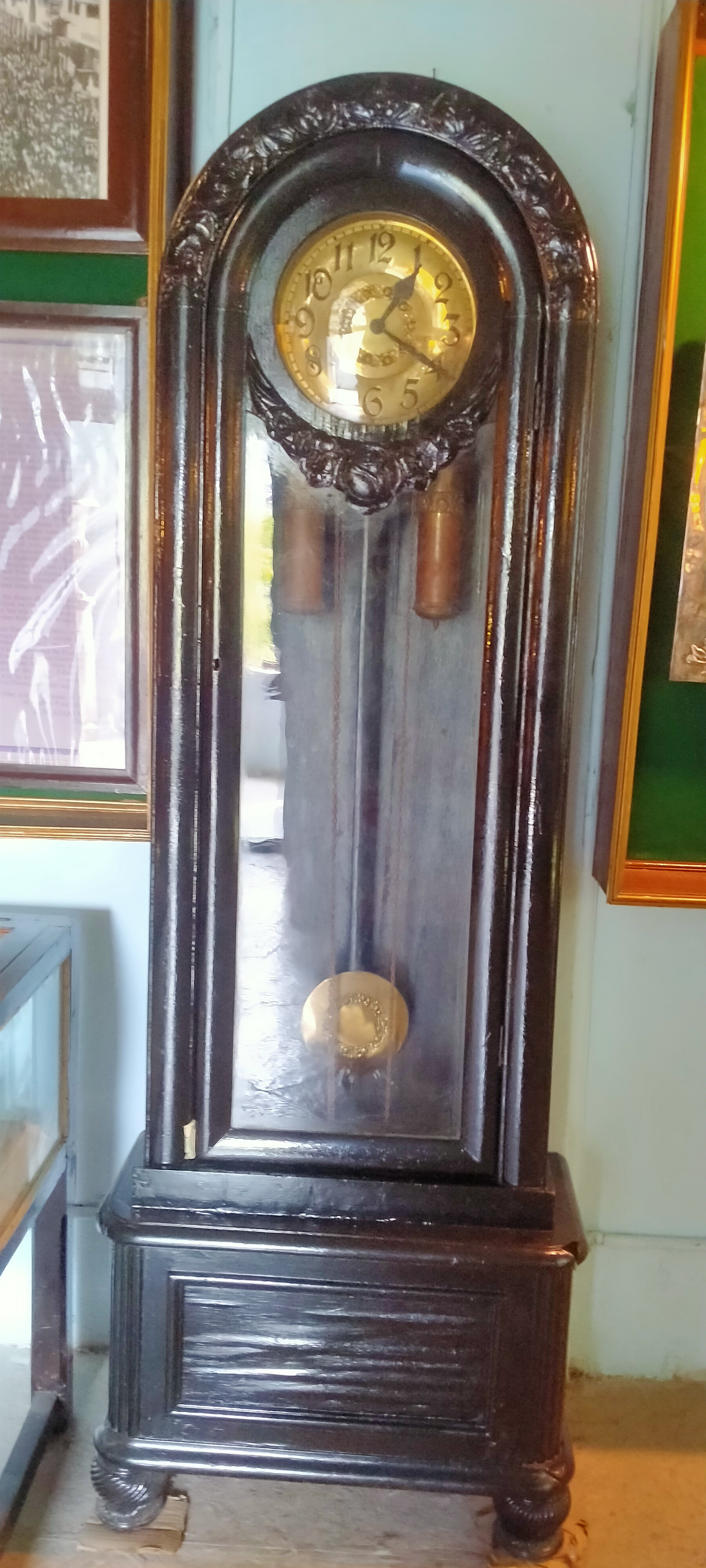
Watch in Nizam museum

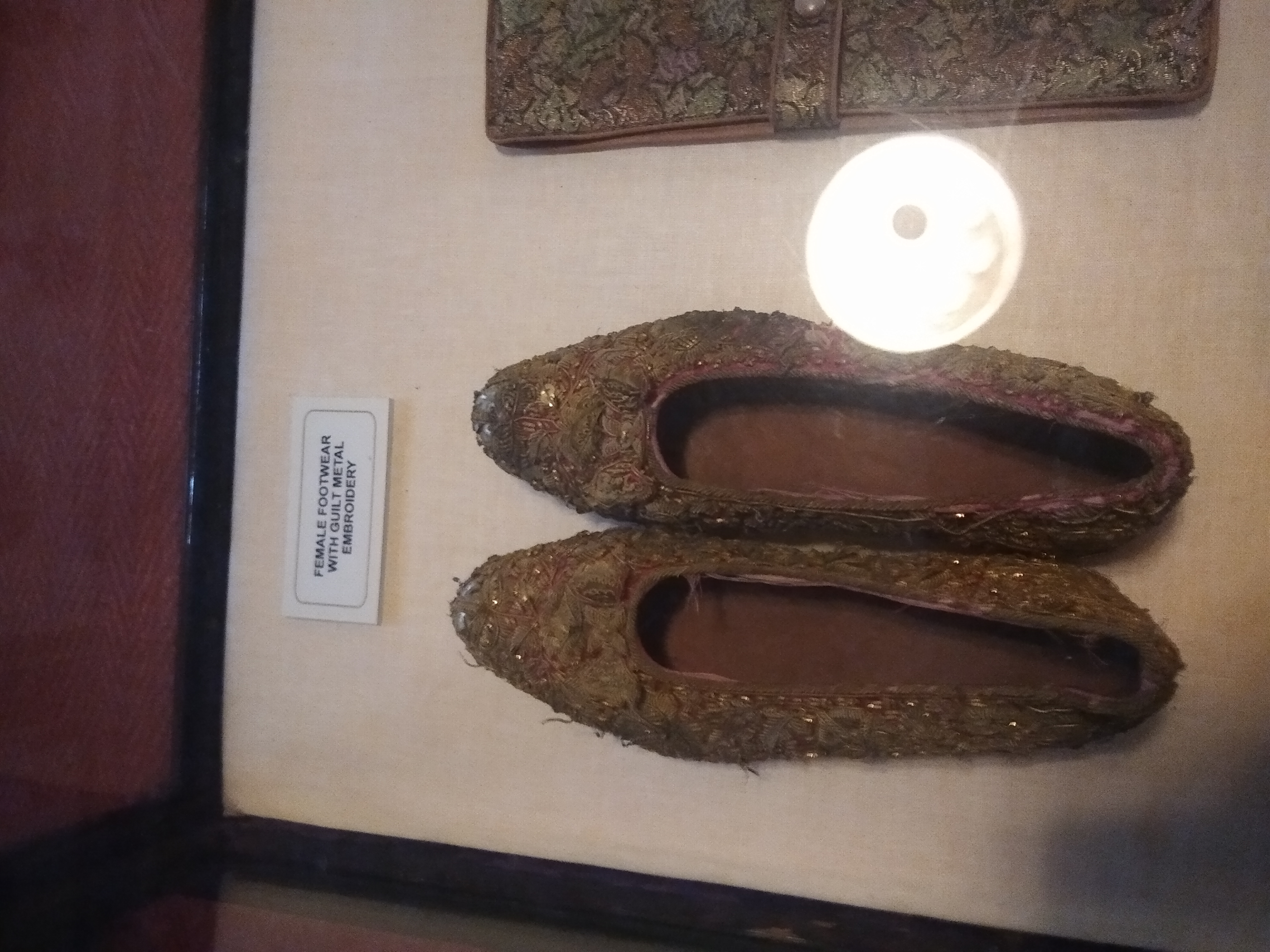
Female footwear with embroidery

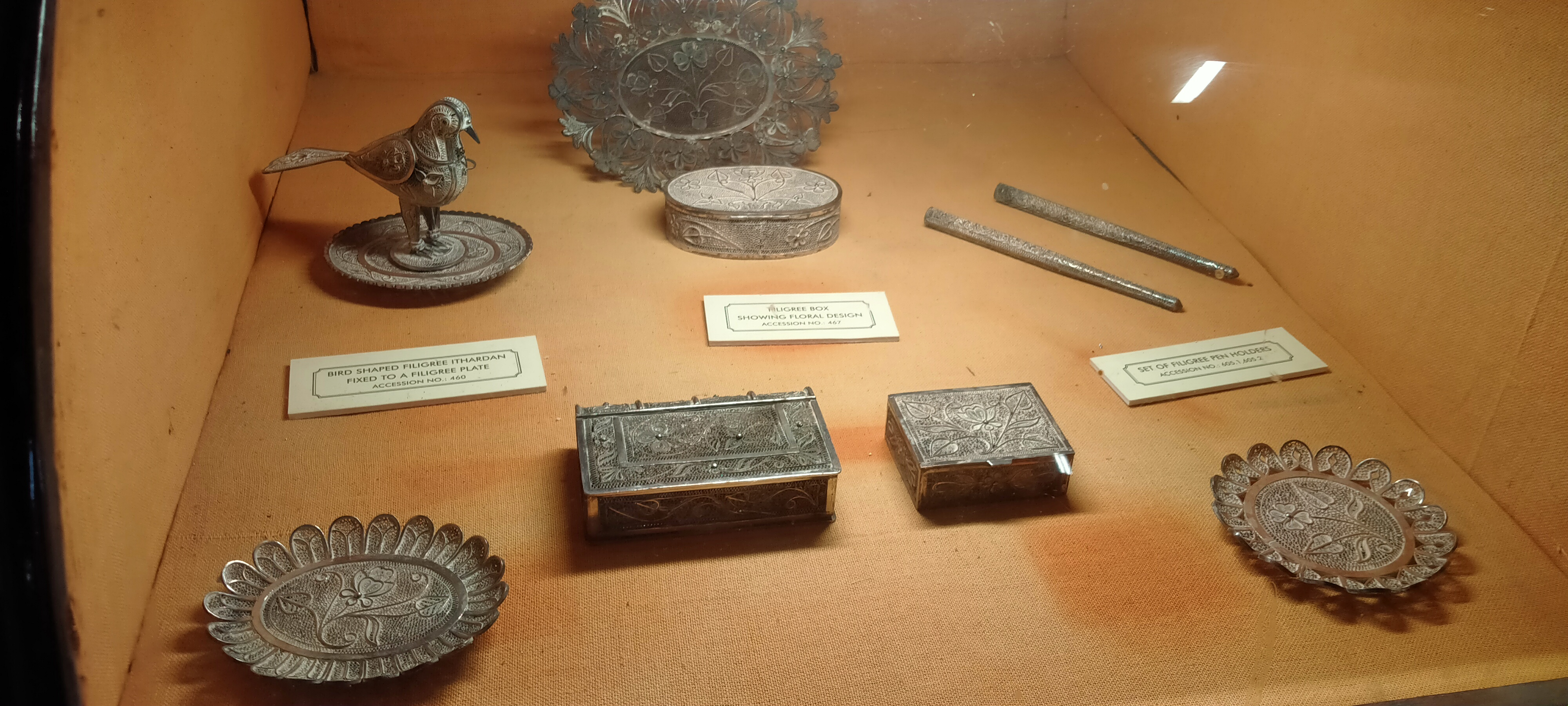
Filigree boxes of Nizams Hyderabad

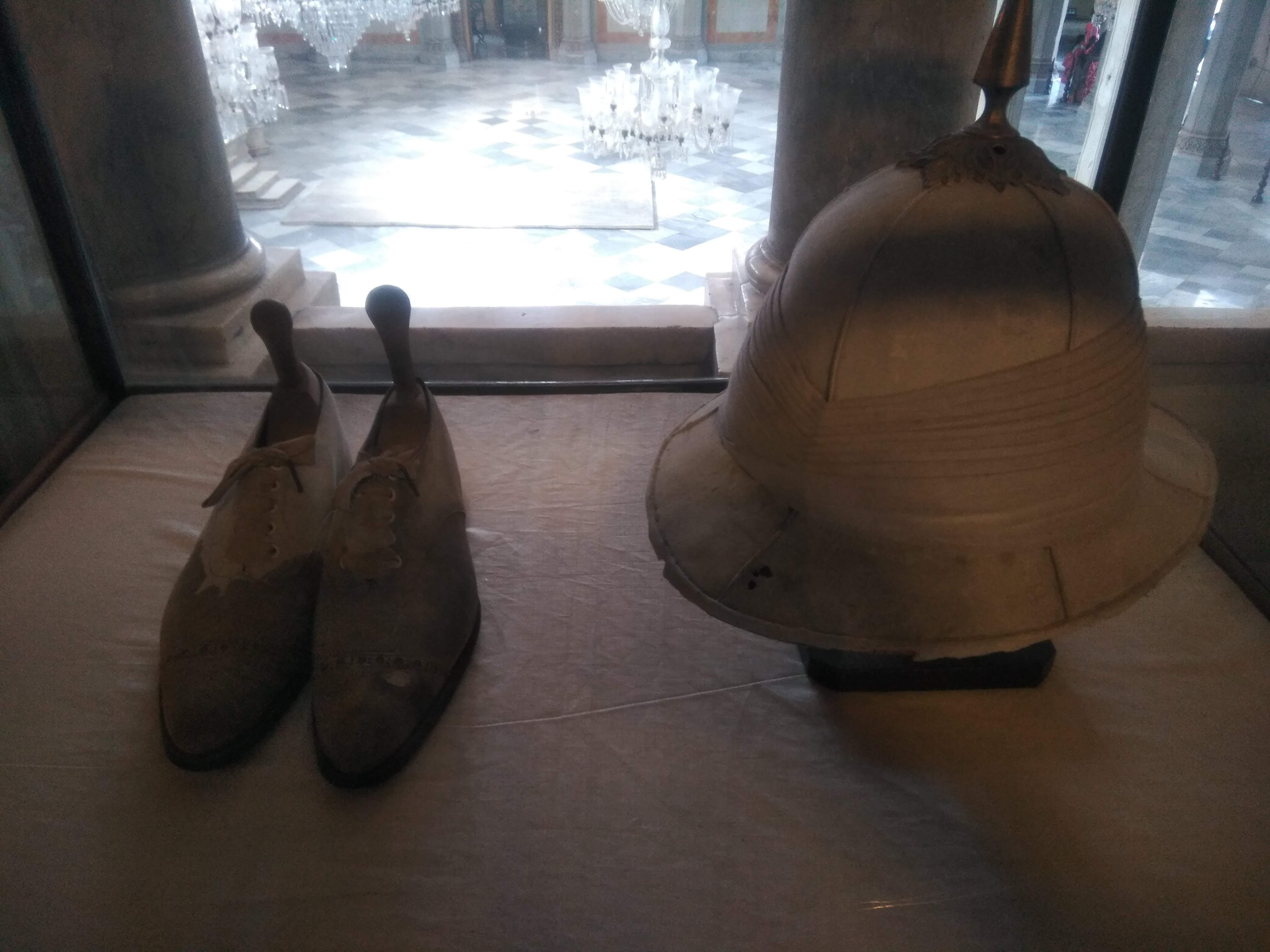
Hat and shoes belonging to Nawab mir Usman Ali Khan

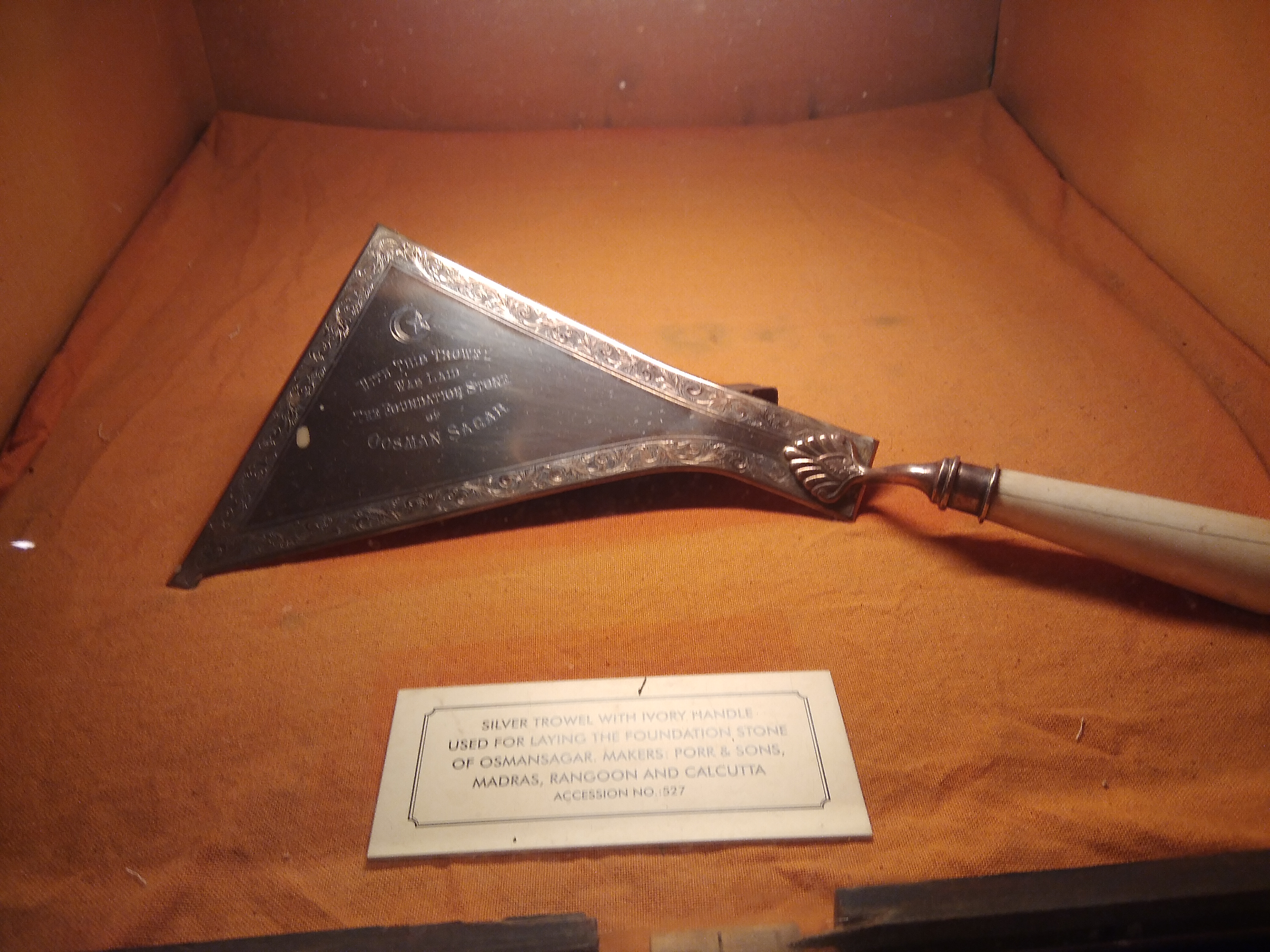
Silver trove

== See also ==
The Nizam’s Museum Full tour
