= Jacob Diamond =

Colorless diamond from India

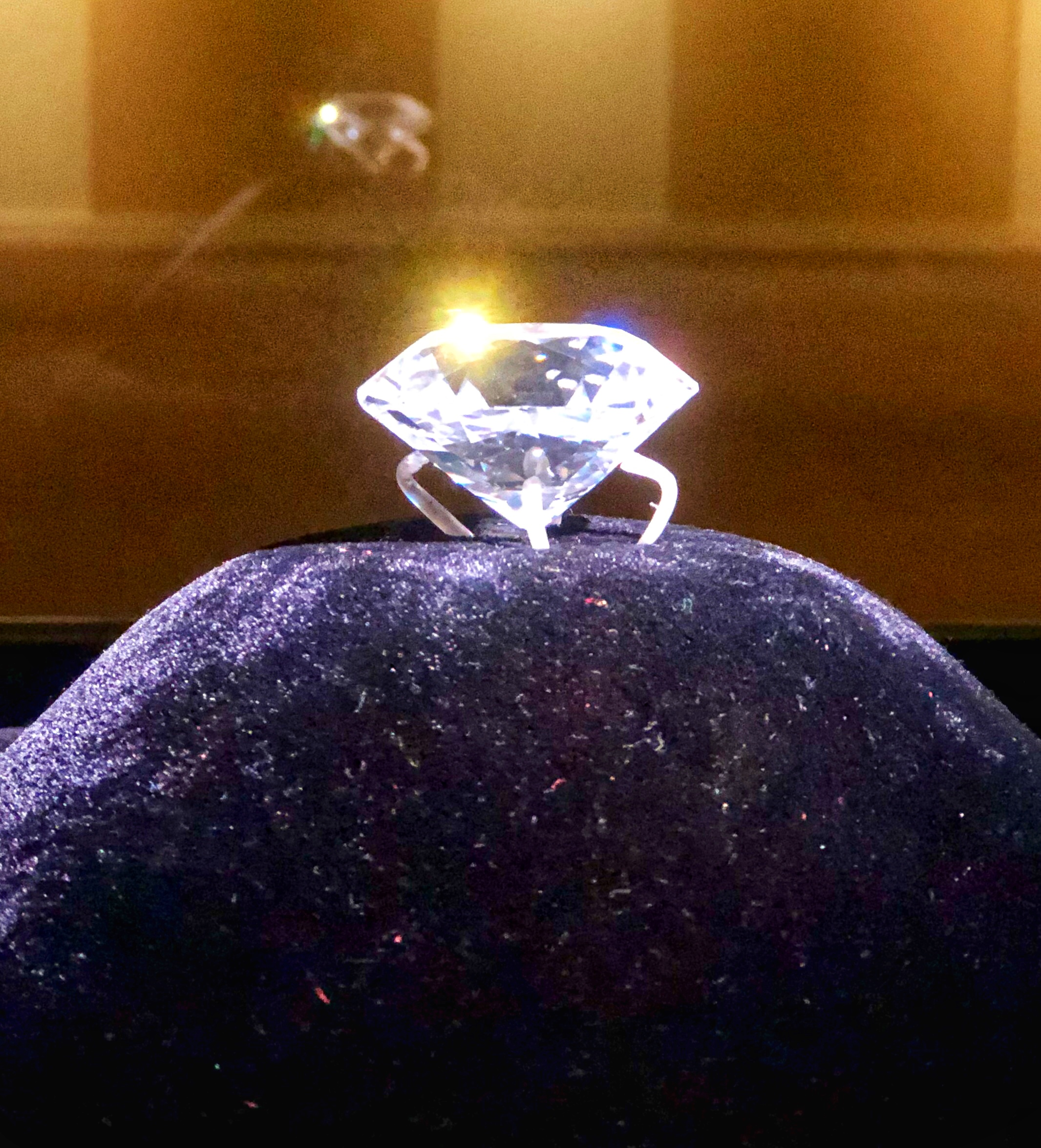
- Weight: 184.5 carats (36.90 g)
- Color: Colourless
- Cut: Rectangular cushion-cut
- Country of origin: India
- Mine of origin: Golconda
- Discovered: 1884
- Original owner: The Nizam of Hyderabad
- Owner: Government of India
- Estimated value: £100 million (2008)

The Jacob Diamond, also known as the Imperial or Victoria Diamond, is a colourless diamond from India (or from the Golconda mines) ranked as the fifth-biggest polished diamond in the world. The last nizam of the Hyderabad State, Mir Osman Ali Khan, found the diamond in the shoe of his father (Mahboob Ali Khan) at Chowmahalla Palace and used it as a paperweight for a long time. It was bought by the government of India for an estimated $US13 million in 1995. It is cut in a rectangular cushion-cut, with 58 facets, and measures 39.5 millimetres (1.56 in) long, 29.25 millimetres (1.152 in) wide and 22.5 millimetres (0.89 in) deep. The diamond weighs 184.75 carats (36.90 g). Currently, it is kept at the Reserve Bank of India vaults in Mumbai. As part of the Nizam's jewellery exhibition in 2001 and 2007, the Jacob Diamond was a major attraction at Salar Jung Museum, Hyderabad.

Unlike the famous Koh-i-Noor, the Jacob Diamond has changed hands only twice in the history of its existence and has not been associated with violence.

== History ==
Before it was sent to Europe to be cut, the uncut diamond is believed to have been over 400 carats (80 g) in weight.

The diamond was put up for sale in 1891 by Alexander Malcolm Jacob, hence the name. It was offered to Mahbub Ali Khan (the sixth nizam of Hyderabad). Initially, the nizam was quite uninterested in the diamond and offered a mere 40 lakhs (4 million rupees) for it. The nizam was asked to make a good faith deposit if he was to go through with the transaction. The European jewel cutters did not like this offer but were forced into court when they lost track of the nizam's deposit. Ultimately, the nizam was awarded the diamond for almost half his original offer, 23 lakhs (2.2 million rupees, approx. $US50,000 at 2005 rates) when the case was resolved. Disillusioned by the process, and now considering the diamond to be unlucky, the nizam wrapped it in cloth and hid it away.

Several years after the death of his father the last nizam, Osman Ali Khan, found the Jacob Diamond in the toe of his father's shoe at Chowmahalla Palace, and he himself used it as a paperweight for a long time until the diamond's true value was realized. Later, the family wished to sell the Jacob among other jewels, but the Government of India blocked the sale, citing that the jewels are a national treasure that could not be sold to foreigners.

After much litigation, the diamond was purchased by the Government of India from the nizam's trust for an estimated $US13 million in 1995, along with other Jewels of The Nizams, and is held at the Reserve Bank of India vault in Mumbai. The Jacob diamond along with jewels of Nizam were handed over by his descendants including Himayat Ali Mirza, and Mukarram Jah.

Displayed as part of the nizam's jewellery exhibition in 2001 and 2007, the Jacob diamond was a major attraction at Salar Jung Museum, Hyderabad.

== See also ==
- Jewels of The Nizams
- Golconda diamonds
- List of diamonds
