= A magnanimous act =

A magnanimous act. From recent history (Eine großmütige Handlung. Aus der neuesten Geschichte) is a prose work by Friedrich Schiller, published in his Kleinere prosaische Schriften. It first appeared in 1782.

== Plot ==
Two brothers love the same woman. As they become aware of this fact, the older brother immediately goes overseas. When he can manage to stay away from his love there, the younger brother is to marry the woman. The older brother soon comes back ill, and now the younger brother chooses to go overseas, to Batavia. If he succeeds in staying away from his beloved there, the older brother is to marry the woman. Soon the younger brother writes from Batavia to explain that his brother can now marry the woman. He even comes to the wedding. A year later the woman dies; on her deathbed she explains that she loved the younger brother more.

== Background ==
Schiller's tale is based on the story of the brothers Ludwig (1740–1812) and Friedrich (1742–1781) von Wurmb. The older brother finally married Christiane von Werthern (1750–1778).

== Allusions ==
In his introduction, Schiller indicates a wish that his text would leave his readers reminded of the works of Samuel Richardson's Sir Charles Grandison and Pamela, or Virtue Rewarded.

== Critical evaluation ==
Bernhard Zeller notes in the afterword that Schiller has referenced a favourite motive of the time with his two brothers in love with the same girl: "the anecdotes are missing all dramatic effects; the poet limited himself to the simple report of the real facts, based on the moral effects and only interrupted by certain reflections."
