= Mir Osman Ali Khan =

Last ruler of Hyderabad, India (1886–1967)

Mir Osman Ali Khan GCSI GBE
- His Exalted Highness; Nizam of Hyderabad
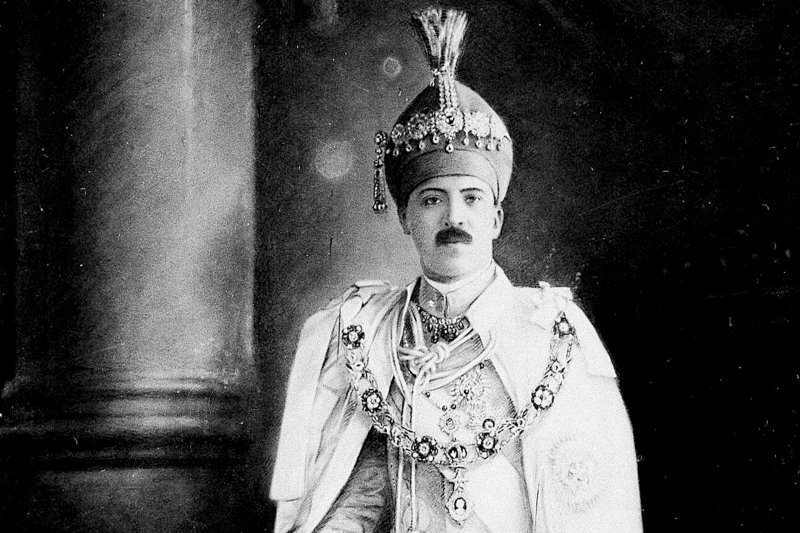
- Official portrait, 1911

Nizam of Hyderabad
- Reign: 29 August 1911 – 17 September 1948 (Note: Titular: 17 September 1948 – 24 February 1967)
- Coronation: 18 September 1911; Chowmahalla Palace
- Predecessor: Mahbub Ali Khan, Asaf Jah VI
- Successor: Title abolished Barkat Ali Khan, Asaf Jah VIII (titular)
- Prime minister: See list: Kishen Pershad Salar Jung III Sayyid Ali Imam Faridoon-ul-Mulk Wali-ud-Daula Akbar Hydari Nawab of Chhatari Mirza Muhammad Ismail Nawab of Chhatari Mir Laiq Ali
- Born: 5 April 1886 or 6 April 1886; Purani Haveli, Hyderabad City, Hyderabad State, British India (now in Telangana, India)
- Died: 24 February 1967 (aged 80); King Kothi Palace, Hyderabad, Andhra Pradesh (now in Telangana), India
- Burial: Judi Mosque, (opposite King Kothi Palace), Hyderabad, Andhra Pradesh, India (now in Telangana, India)
- Spouse: Azam-un-Nisa Begum (m. 1906; died 1955) Shahzada Begum; Ikbal Begum; Gowhar Begum Mazhar-un-Nisa Begum (m. 1923; died 1964) Leila Begum; Jani Begum
- Issue Among others: Azam Jah; Moazzam Jah
- House: Asaf Jahi dynasty
- Father: Mahbub Ali Khan, Asaf Jah VI
- Mother: Amat-uz-Zahra Begum
- Religion: Sunni Islam
- Military career
- Allegiance: Hyderabad State
- Branch: Hyderabad State Forces
- Service years: 1911–1948
- Rank: Nizam
- Conflicts: Operation Polo

Mir Osman Ali Khan, Asaf Jah VII (5 or 6 April 1886 – 24 February 1967) was the last Nizam (ruler) of Hyderabad State, the largest state in the erstwhile British Indian Empire. He ascended the throne on 29 August 1911, at the age of 25 and ruled the State of Hyderabad until 1948, when the Indian Union annexed it. He was styled as His Exalted Highness (H.E.H) the Nizam of Hyderabad, and was widely considered one of the world's wealthiest people of all time. With some estimates placing his wealth at 2% of U.S. GDP, his portrait was on the cover of Time magazine in 1937. As a semi-autonomous monarch, he had his mint, printing his currency, the Hyderabadi rupee, and had a private treasury that was said to contain £100 million in gold and silver bullion, and a further £400 million of jewels (in 2008 terms). The major source of his wealth was the Golconda mines, the only supplier of diamonds in the world at that time. Among them was the Jacob Diamond, valued at some £50 million (in 2008 terms), and used by the Nizam as a paperweight.

During his 37-year rule, electricity was introduced, and railways, roads, and airports were developed. He was known as the "Architect of modern Hyderabad" and is credited with establishing many public institutions in the city of Hyderabad, including Osmania University, Osmania General Hospital, State Bank of Hyderabad, Begumpet Airport, and the Hyderabad High Court. Two reservoirs, Osman Sagar and Himayat Sagar, were built during his reign, to prevent future flooding after the Great Musi Flood of 1908 in the city. The Nizam also constructed the Nizam Sagar Dam and, in 1923, a reservoir was constructed across the Manjira River, a tributary of the Godavari River, between Achampet (Nizamabad) and Banjepally villages of Kamareddy district in Telangana, India. It is located at about 144 km (89 mi) northwest of Hyderabad and is the oldest dam in the state.

The Nizam had refused to accede Hyderabad to India after the country's independence on 15 August 1947. He wanted his domains to remain an independent state or join Pakistan. Later, he wanted his state to join India; however, his power had weakened because of the Telangana Rebellion and the rise of a radical militia known as the Razakars, whom he could not put down. In 1948, the Indian Army invaded and annexed Hyderabad State and defeated the Razakars. The Nizam became the Rajpramukh of Hyderabad State between 1950 and 1956, after which the state was partitioned and became part of Andhra Pradesh, Karnataka, and Maharashtra.

In 1951, he started the construction of Nizam Orthopedic Hospital (now known as Nizam's Institute of Medical Sciences (NIMS)) and leased it to the government for 99 years for a monthly rent of Rs.1. He also donated 14,000 acres (5,700 ha) of land from his estate to Vinobha Bhave's Bhoodan movement for re-distribution among landless farmers.

== Early life ==
Mir Osman Ali Khan was born 5 or 6 April 1886, the second son of Mahboob Ali Khan, Asaf Jah VI and Amat-uz-Zahra Begum at Purani Haveli (also known as Masarrat Mahal palace). He was educated privately and reportedly became fluent in Urdu, Persian, Arabic and English. Under Nawab Muhammad Ali Beg he received court ethics and military training.

On the recommendation of the Viceroy of India, Lord Elgin in 1898, in early 1899 Brian Egerton (of the Egerton family and former tutor to Maharajah of Bikaner Ganga Singh) was appointed as Mir Osman Ali Khan's English tutor for two years. During this period he lived away from the principal palace. He had his own household, to avoid the atmosphere of the palace quarters, under the guidance of Egerton and other British officials and mentors, so that he could flourish as a gentleman of the highest class. Brian Egerton recorded that as a child, Mir Osman Ali Khan was magnanimous and "anxious to learn". Because of the indomitable attitude of zenana (the women) who were determined to send Osman Ali Khan out of Hyderabad for further studies, he pursued them at Mayo College after consultation with the principal nobles of the Paigah family.

== Reign ==
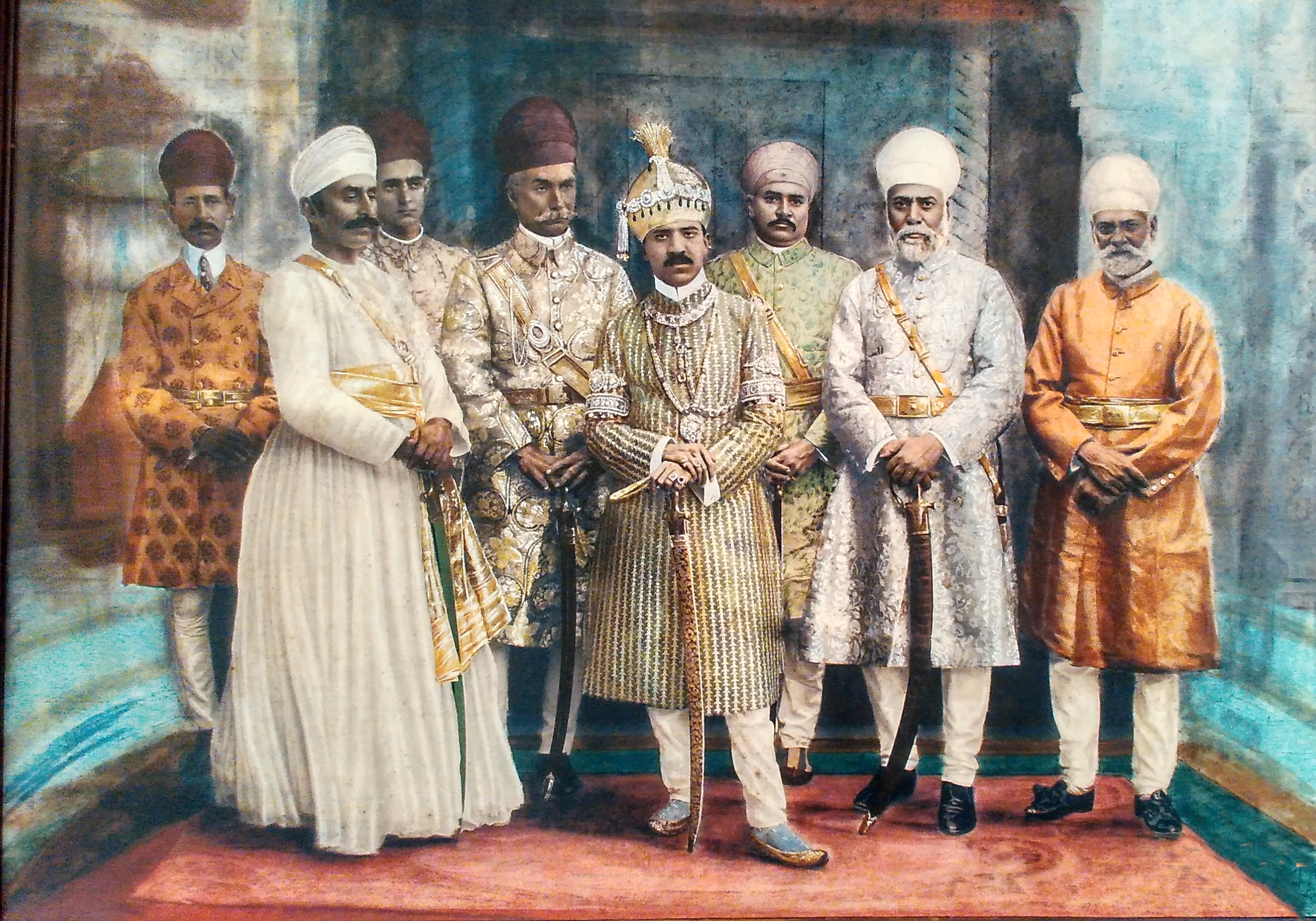
The Nizam when he ascended the throne at 25 years of age

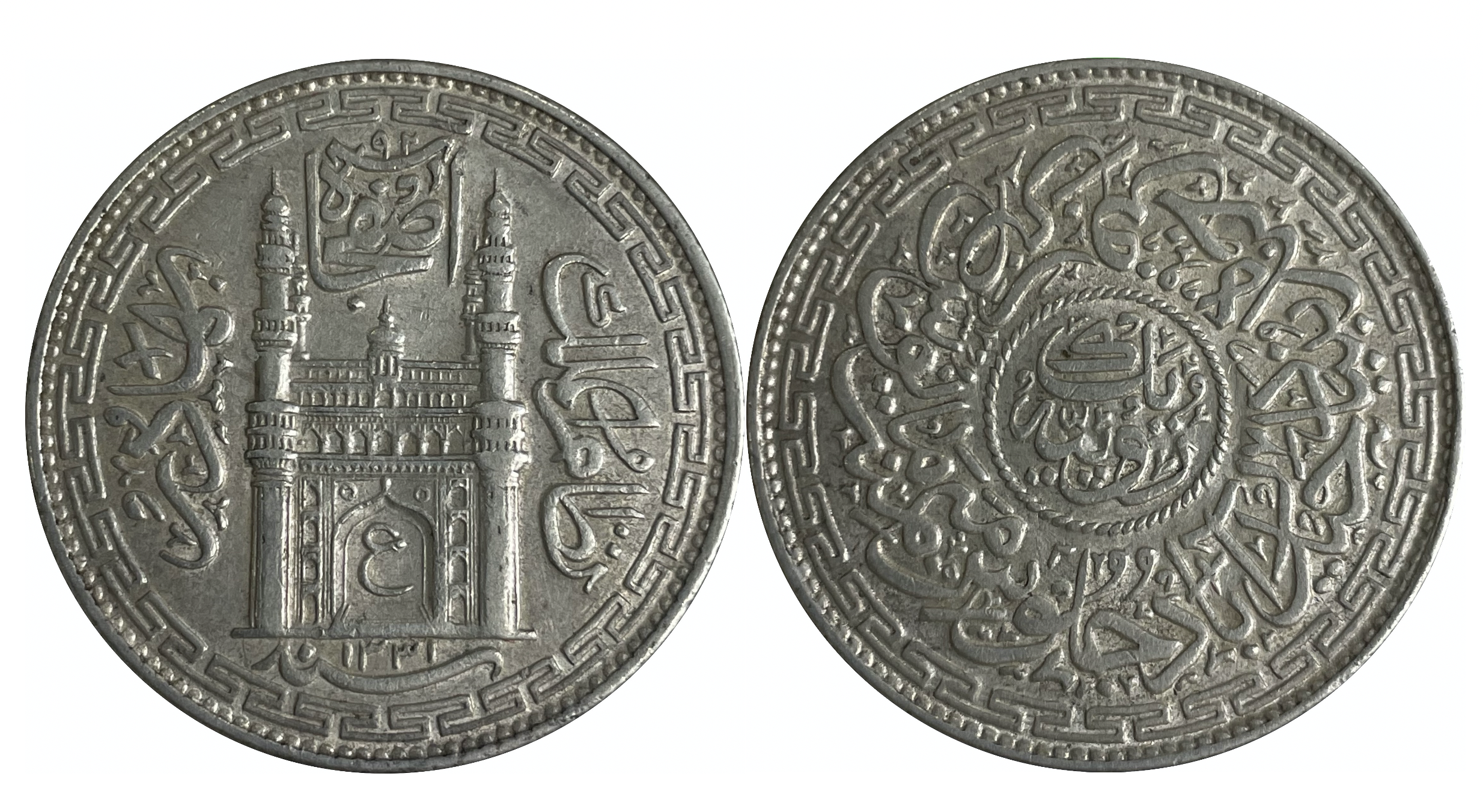
Silver coin: 1 rupee Hyderabad State, Mir Osman Ali Khan, 1913

Mir Mahboob Ali Khan The VI Nizam died on 29 August 1911 and on the same day Mir Osman Ali Khan was proclaimed Nizam VII under the supervision of Nawab Shahab Jung, a minister of Police and Public works. On 18 September 1911, the coronation was officially held at the Chowmahalla Palace.

His coronation Durbar (court) included the prime minister of Hyderabad Maharaja Kishen Pershad, Colonel Alexander Pinhey (1911–1916) British resident of Hyderabad, the Paigah, and the distinguished nobles of the state and the head of principalities under Nizam domain.

The famous mines of Golconda were the major source of wealth for the Nizams, with the Kingdom of Hyderabad being the only supplier of diamonds for the global market in the 18th century.

Mir Osman Ali Khan acceded as the Nizam of Hyderabad upon the death of his father in 1911. The state of Hyderabad was the largest of the princely states in colonial India. With an area of 86,000 square miles (223,000 km^{2}), it was roughly the size of the present-day United Kingdom. The Nizam was the highest-ranking prince in India, was one of only five princes entitled to a 21-gun salute, held the unique title of "Nizam", and was titled "His Exalted Highness" and "Faithful Ally of the British Crown".

=== Early years (1911 to 1918) ===
In 1908, three years before the Nizam's coronation, the city of Hyderabad was struck by a major flood that resulted in the death of thousands. The Nizam, on the advice of Sir M. Visvesvaraya, ordered the construction of two large reservoirs—the Osman Sagar and Himayat Sagar—to prevent another flood.

He was given the title of "Faithful Ally of the British Crown" after World War One because of his financial contribution to the British Empire's war effort. Part of the reason behind his unique title of "His Exalted Highness" and other titles was due to the huge amounts of financial help that he provided the British amounting to nearly £25 million (£1,200,000,000 in 2025). (For example, No. 110 Squadron RAF's original complement of Airco DH.9A aircraft were Osman Ali's gift. Each aircraft bore an inscription to that effect, and the unit became known as the "Hyderabad Squadron".) He also paid for a Royal Navy vessel, the N-class destroyer, HMAS Nizam commissioned in 1940 and transferred to the Royal Australian Navy.

In 1918, the Nizam issued a firman (decree) that established Osmania University, the first university to have Urdu as the language of instruction. The present campus was completed in 1934. The Firman also mentioned the university's detailed mission and objectives. The establishment of Osmania University was highly lauded by Nobel Prize laureate Rabindranath Tagore who was overjoyed to see the day when Indians are "freed from the shackles of a foreign language and our education becomes naturally accessible to all our people".

=== Post-World War (1918 to 1939) ===
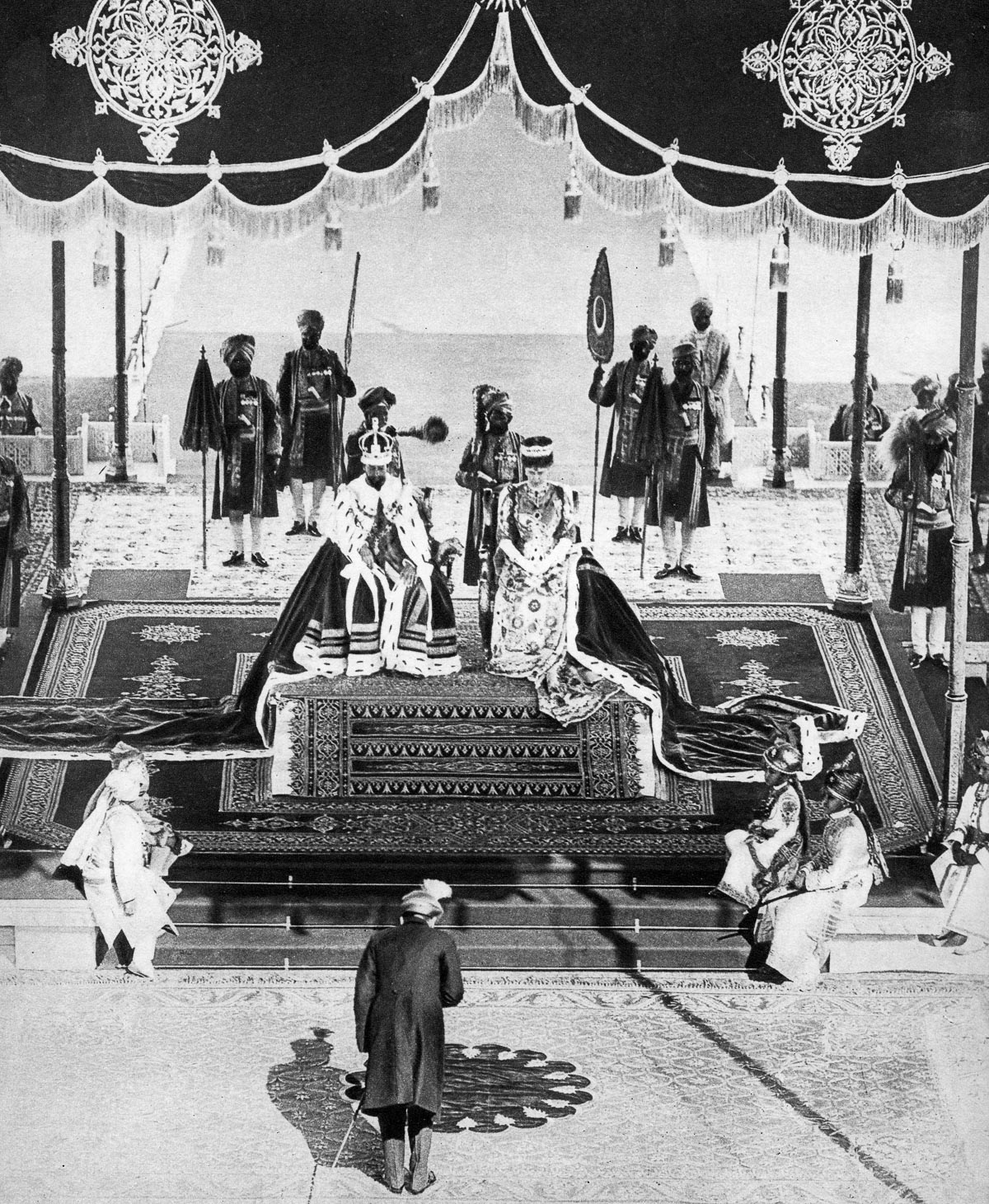
The Nizam pays homage to King George and Queen Mary at the Delhi Durbar, December 1911

In 1919, the Nizam ordered the formation of the Executive Council of Hyderabad, presided over by Sir Sayyid Ali Imam, including eight other members, each in charge of one or more departments. The president of the Executive Council would also be the prime minister of Hyderabad.

The Begumpet Airport was established in 1930 with the eventual formation of Hyderabad Aero Club by the Nizam in 1936. Initially, Nizam's private airline, Deccan Airways, one of the earliest airlines in British India, used it as a domestic and international airport. The terminal building was constructed in 1937. The first commercial flight took off from the airport in 1946.

=== Final years of his reign (1939 to 1948) ===
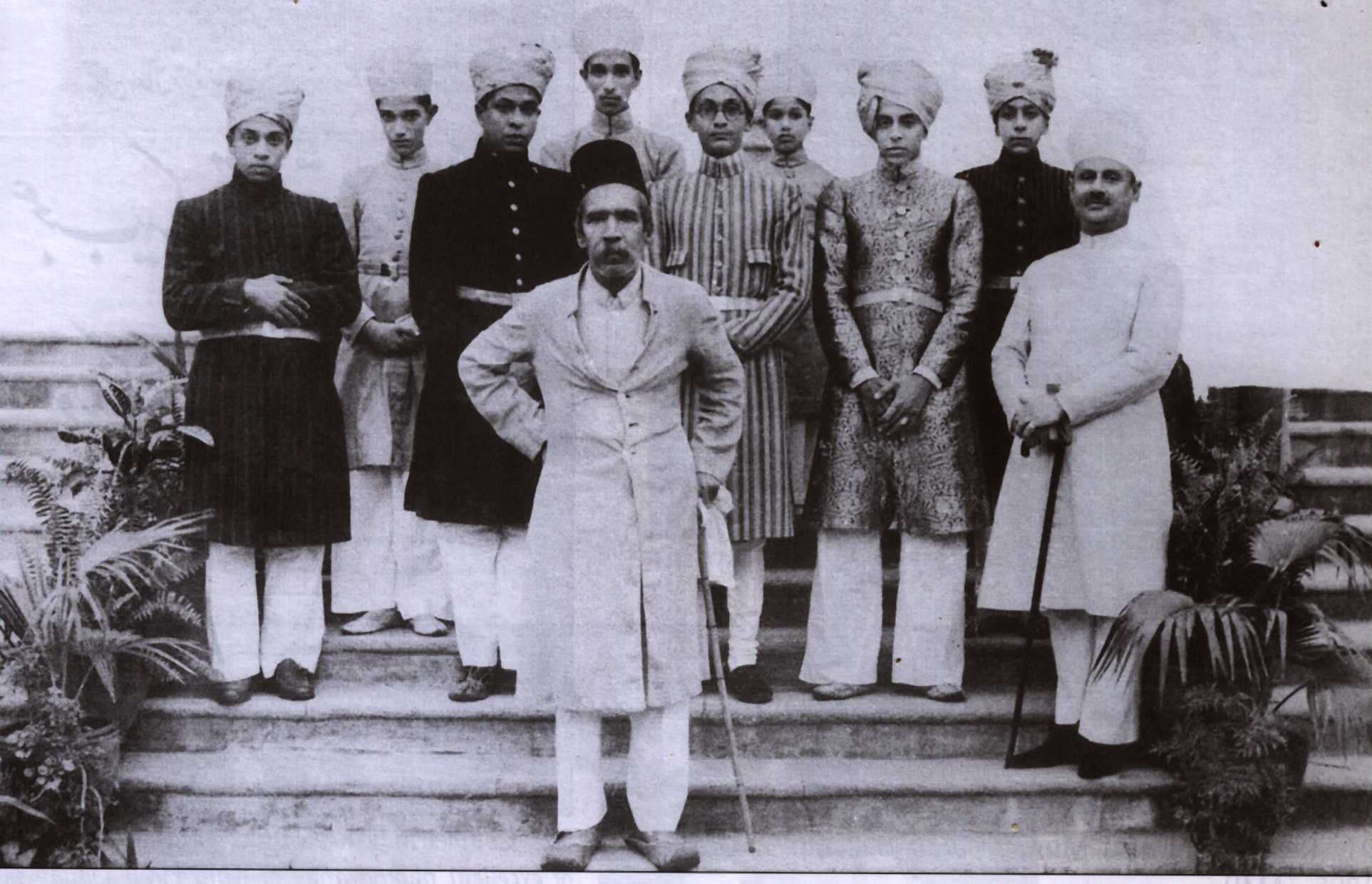
The Nizam with the Al-Quaiti royal family

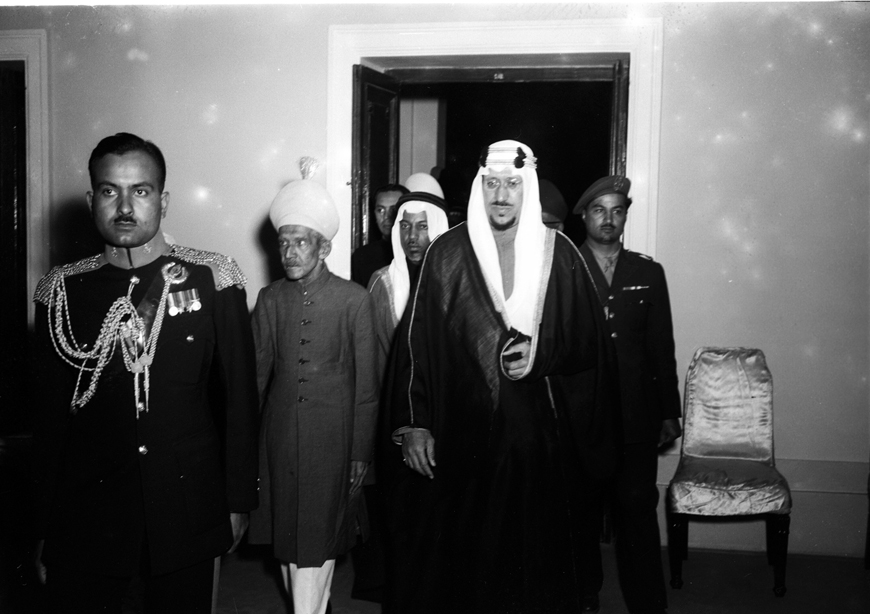
The Nizam with King Saud during his visit to Hyderabad

The Nizam arranged a matrimonial alliance with the deposed caliph Abdulmejid II whereby Nizam's first son Azam Jah would marry Princess Durrushehvar of the Ottoman Empire. It was believed that this union between Nizam and Abdulmejid II would lead to the emergence of a Muslim ruler who could be acceptable to the world powers in place of the Ottoman Sultans. After India's Independence, the Nizam attempted to declare his sovereignty over the state of Hyderabad, either as a protectorate of the British Empire or as a sovereign monarchy. However, his power weakened because of the Telangana Rebellion and the rise of the Razakars, a Muslim militia who wanted Hyderabad to remain under Muslim rule. In 1948, India invaded and annexed Hyderabad State, and the rule of the Nizam ended. He became the Rajpramukh and served from 26 January 1950 to 31 October 1956.

== Contributions to society ==
=== Educational initiatives ===
By donating to major educational institutions throughout India, he introduced many educational reforms during his reign. Up to 11% of his budget was spent on education. Primary education was made compulsory and provided free for the poor.

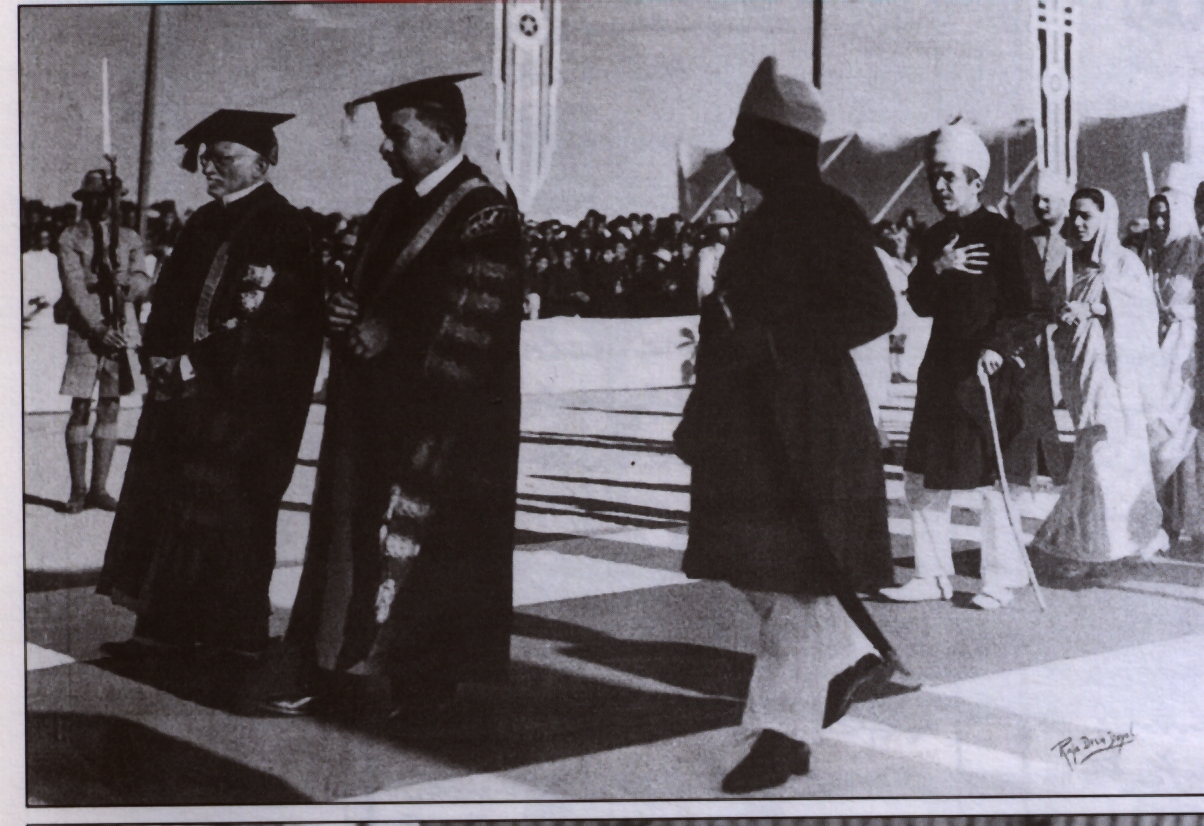
The Nizam at the inauguration of the Osmania University Arts College, c. 1937

==== Osmania University ====
He founded the Osmania University in 1918 through a royal firman. It is one of the largest universities in India. Schools, colleges and a Department for Translation were set up.

=== Construction of major public buildings ===
Nearly all the major public buildings and institutions in Hyderabad city, such as the Hyderabad High Court, Jubilee Hall, Nizamia Observatory, Moazzam Jahi Market, Kachiguda Railway Station, Asafiya Library (State Central Library, Hyderabad), the Town Hall now known as the Assembly Hall, Hyderabad Museum now known as the State Museum; hospitals like Osmania General Hospital, Nizamia Hospital and many other buildings were constructed during his reign. He also built the Hyderabad House in Delhi, now used for diplomatic meetings by the Government of India.

=== Establishment of Hyderabad State Bank ===
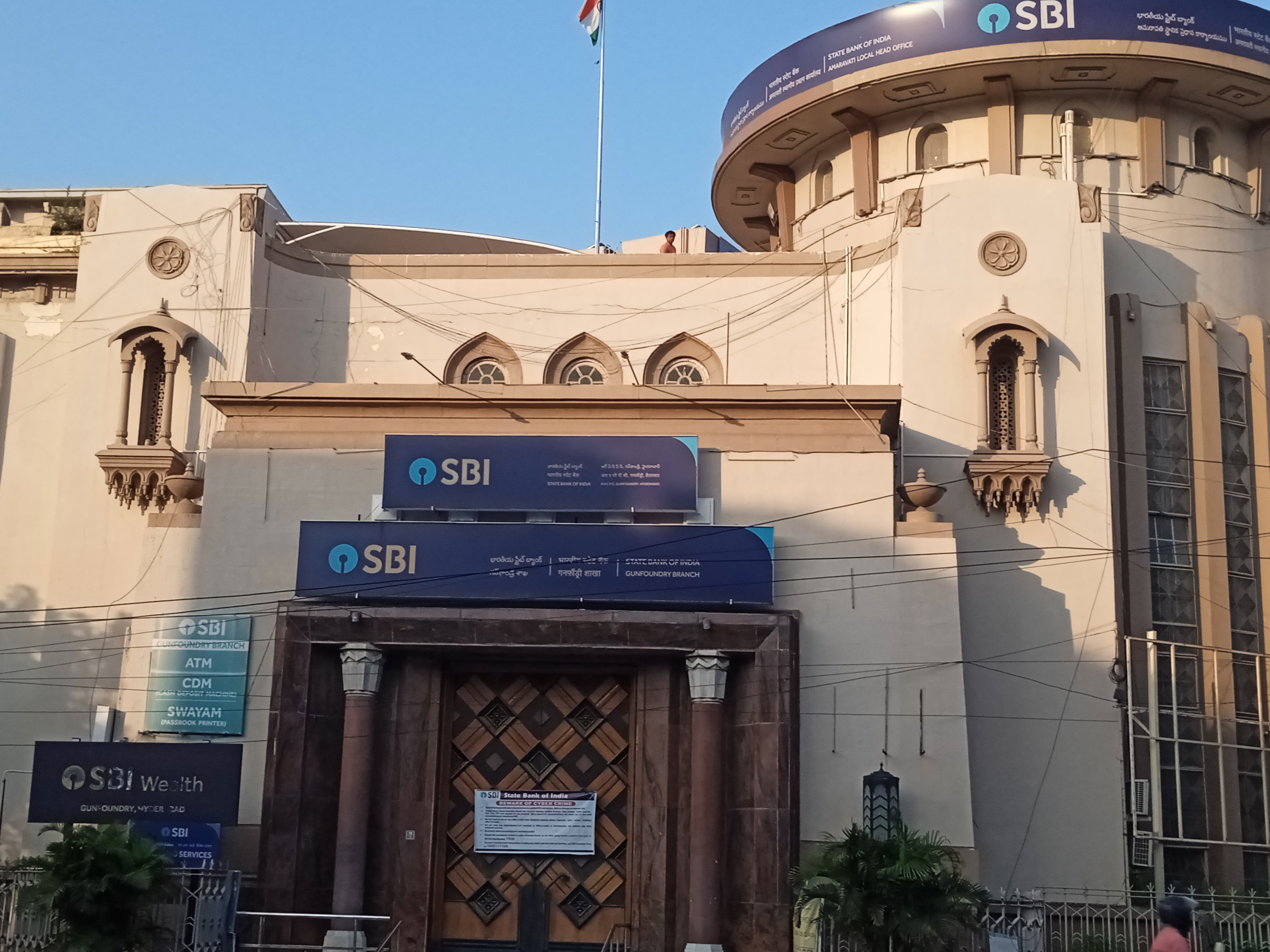
Hyderabad State bank post merger into SBI, photo taken in 2012

In 1941, he started his bank, the Hyderabad State Bank. It was later renamed State Bank of Hyderabad and merged with the State Bank of India as the state's central bank in 2017. It was established on 8 August 1941 under the Hyderabad State Bank Act. The bank managed the Osmania Sicca (Hyderabadi rupee), the currency of the state of Hyderabad. It was the only state in India that had its currency, and the only state in British India where the ruler was allowed to issue currency. In 1953, the bank absorbed, by merger, the Mercantile Bank of Hyderabad, which Raja Pannalal Pitti had founded in 1935.

In 1956, the Reserve Bank of India took over the bank as its first subsidiary and renamed it State Bank of Hyderabad (SBH). The Subsidiary Banks Act was passed in 1959. On 1 October 1959, SBH and the other banks of the princely states became subsidiaries of SBI. It merged with SBI on 31 March 2017.

=== Flood prevention ===
After the Great Musi Flood of 1908, which killed an estimated 50,000 people, the Nizam constructed two lakes to prevent flooding—the Osman Sagar and Himayat Sagar named after himself, and his son Azam Jah respectively.

=== Agricultural reforms ===
The Nizam founded agricultural research in the Marathwada region of Hyderabad State with the establishment of the Main Experimental Farm in 1918 in Parbhani. During his rule, agricultural education was available only at Hyderabad; crop research centres for sorghum, cotton, and fruits existed in Parbhani. After independence, the Indian government developed this facility further and renamed it Marathwada Agriculture University on 18 May 1972.

=== Contribution to Indian aviation ===
India's first airport—the Begumpet Airport—was established in the 1930s with the formation of the Hyderabad Aero Club by the Nizam. Initially, it was used as a domestic and international airport by Deccan Airways Limited, the first airline in British India. The airport terminal was constructed in 1937.

== Philanthropy ==
=== Donations to Hindu temples ===
During Mir Osman Ali Khan’s regime, financial support of Rs 97,000 and more than Two-lakh-acres of land were donated for Hindu temples. Histories of some Hindu temple in Hyderabad, both oral and written, feature close interaction with the Nizam’s court and administration.

The Nizam donated Rs. 82,825 to the Yadagirigutta temple at Bhongir, Rs. 29,999 to the Sita Ramachandraswamy temple, Bhadrachalam and yearly donation of Rs. 8,000 to the Tirupati Balaji Temple.

He also donated Rs. 50,000 towards the reconstruction of Sitarambagh temple located in the old city of Hyderabad, and bestowed a grant of 100,000 Hyderabadi rupees towards the reconstruction of Thousand Pillar Temple near Warangal.

He also donated 1,525 acres of land to "Sita Rama Swami Temple" located in Devaryamjal.

Temples which received yearly monetary grants were Yadgirigutta temple, Mahetta Balekdas temple, Sikhar temple, Seetharambagh temple and Jamsingh temple. Several Hindu priests, living or deceased, were paid pensions for subsistence, either monthly or annually.

==== Restoration of Ramappa temple ====
The 7th Nizam also donated towards restoration of Ramappa Temple which is now a UNESCO World Heritage Site.

=== Donation towards golden temple ===
After hearing about the Golden Temple of Amritsar through Maharaja Ranjit Singh, he started providing it with yearly grants.

=== Donation towards the compilation of the Holy Mahabharata ===
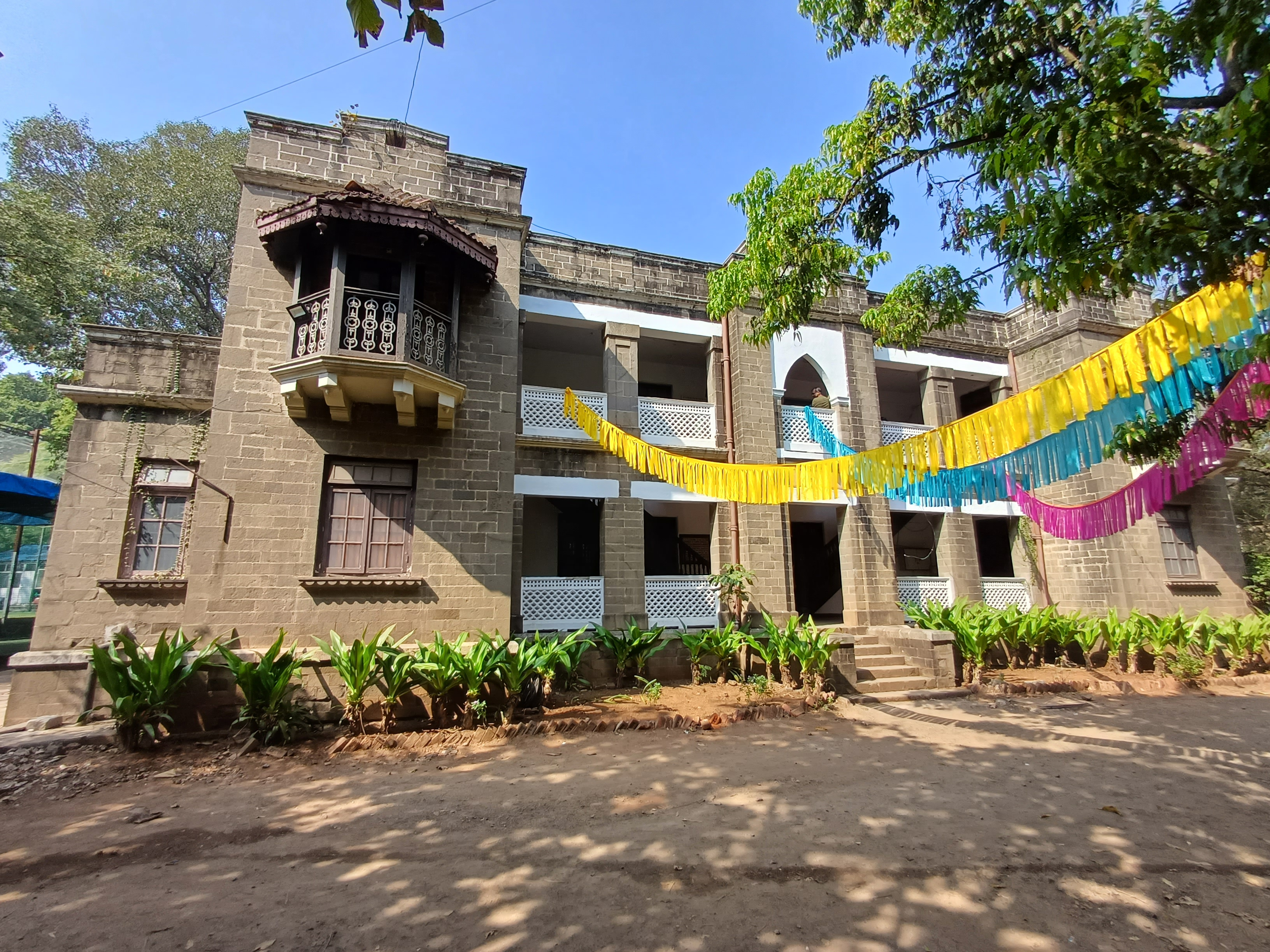
Entrance view of Nizam's Guest House -BORI

In 1932, there was a need for money for the publication of the Holy Mahabharata by the Bhandarkar Oriental Research Institute located in Pune. A formal request was made to Mir Osman Ali Khan, who granted Rs. 1000 per year for 11 years.

He also gave Rs 50,000 for the construction of the institute's guest house, Nizam Guest House, which still stands today.

=== Donations to educational institutions ===
The Nizam donated Rs 1 million to the Banaras Hindu University, Rs. 500,000 to the Aligarh Muslim University, and 300,000 to the Indian Institute of Science.

He also made large donations to many institutions in India and abroad with special emphasis given to educational institutions such as the Jamia Nizamia and the Darul Uloom Deoband.

Shri Shivaji Educational Society Amravati received a total grant of 50,000 from the Nizam in the 1940s.

=== Donation in Gold to the National Defence Fund ===
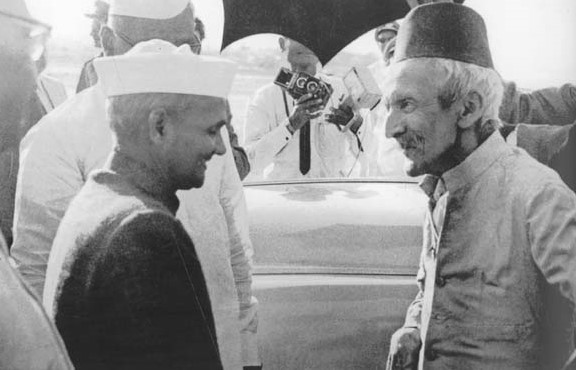
The Nizam with the then Prime Minister of India Lal Bahadur Shastri

In October 1962, during the Sino-Indian War, the PM Lal Bahadur Shastri visited Hyderabad and requested the Nizam to contribute to the National Defence Fund, set up in the wake of the Indo-Chinese skirmishes. In response, the Nizam donated 5,000 Kilos of gold to the Indian army, which translates to Rs 2,500 Crore (per 2018 gold price in the international market).

=== Restoration of Ajanta Ellora caves ===
During the early 1920s, the site of Ajanta Caves was under the princely state of the Hyderabad and Osman Ali Khan appointed experts to restore the artwork, converted the site into a museum and built a road to enable tourists to visit the site.

The Nizam's Director of Archaeology obtained the services of two experts from Italy, Professor Lorenzo Cecconi, assisted by Count Orsini, to restore the paintings in the caves. The Director of Archaeology said of the work of Cecconi and Orsini:

The repairs to the caves and the cleaning and conservation of the frescoes have been carried out on such sound principles and in such a scientific manner that these matchless monuments have found a fresh lease of life for at least a couple of centuries.

=== Donations to Middle East ===
The Nizam provided substantial funding for the restoration of Masjid Al-Aqsa (considered the third holiest site in Islam). Additionally, he contributed greatly to the creation of waqfs (Muslim endowments) in Palestine and supported the renovation and restoration of a hospice named Zawiyah Hindiyya.

== Firman to ban public cow slaughter ==
In 1922, Nizam VII issued a firman banning the public slaughter of cows in his kingdom.

== Operation Polo and abdication ==
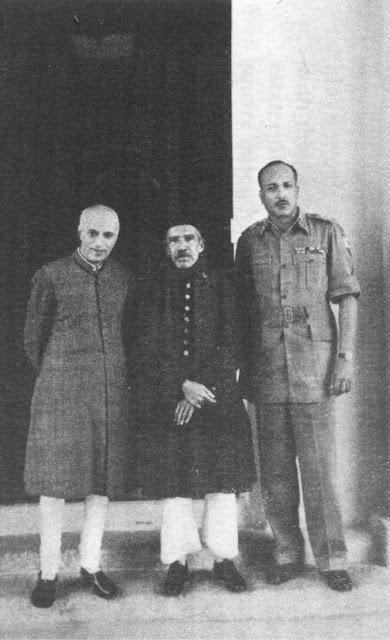
From left to right: Prime Minister Jawaharlal Nehru, the Nizam and Major General Jayanto Nath Chaudhuri after Hyderabad's accession to India

After Indian independence in 1947, the country was partitioned into Dominion of India and Dominion of Pakistan. The princely states were left free to make whatever arrangement they wished with either India or Pakistan. The Nizam ruled over more than 16 million people and 82,698 square miles (214,190 km^{2}) of territory when the British withdrew from the sub-continent in 1947. But unlike the other princely states, the Nizam refused to sign the instrument of accession. Instead he opted to sign a 1-year standstill agreement agreed upon by the British, and signed by then Viceroy Lord Mountbatten. The Nizam refused to join either India or Pakistan, preferring to form a separate independent kingdom within the British Commonwealth of Nations.

This proposal for independence was rejected by the British government, but the Nizam continued to explore it. Towards this end, he kept up open negotiations with the Government of India regarding the modalities of a future relationship while opening covert negotiations with Pakistan in a similar vein. The Nizam cited the Razakars as evidence that the people of the state were opposed to any agreement with India.

The one-year standstill agreement turned out to be a severe blow to Nizam as it gave all foreign affairs, communication and defence power to the Indian government. The new Indian government wasn't happy that a sovereign state would exist right at the centre of India. In accordance to this, they ultimately decided to invade Hyderabad in 1948, in operation code-named Operation Polo. Under the supervision of Major General Jayanto Nath Chaudhuri, one division of the Indian Army and a tank brigade invaded and captured Hyderabad. The annexation was over in just 109 hours or roughly 4 days. Due to no foreign connections and no real defence, the war was a losing cause for Hyderabad from the start. After annexation, the territory came under Indian rule and the Nizam was removed from his position but allowed to keep all personal wealth and title.

== Wealth ==
The Nizam was so wealthy that he was portrayed on the cover of Time magazine on 22 February 1937, being described as the world's richest man. At its peak, the wealth of Osman Ali Khan, Asaf Jah VII was worth ₹660 crore (US$69 million) (all his conceivable assets combined) in the early 1940s, while Nizam's entire treasure of jewels, would be worth between US$150 million and US$500 million variously in today's terms. He used the Jacob Diamond, a 185-carat diamond that is part of the Nizam's jewellery, as a paperweight. During his days as Nizam, he was reputed to be the richest man in the world, having a fortune estimated at US$2 billion in the early 1940s (US$39.4 billion in 2025 dollars) or two percent of the US economy then.

The Nizam's personal fortune was estimated to be roughly £110 million, including £40 million in gold and jewels (equivalent to £1,862,310,826 in 2025).

The Indian government still exhibits the jewellery as the Jewels of the Nizams of Hyderabad (now in Delhi). There are 173 jewels, which include emeralds weighing nearly 2,000 carats (0.40 kg), and pearls exceeding 40 thousand chows. The collection includes gemstones, turban ornaments, necklaces and pendants, belts and buckles, earrings, armbands, bangles and bracelets, anklets, cufflinks and buttons, watch chains, and rings, toe rings, and nose rings.

Along with the Nizam's jewels, two Bari gold coins worth hundreds of crores were considered the rarest in the world. Himayat Ali Mirza has requested the central government to bring these coins, which were made in the Arabic script, back to Hyderabad.

=== Gift to Queen Elizabeth II ===
In 1947, Nizam made a gift of diamond jewels, including a tiara and necklace, to the future Queen Elizabeth II on the occasion of her marriage. The brooches and necklace, known as the Nizam of Hyderabad necklace, were worn by the Queen until her death.

== Personal life ==
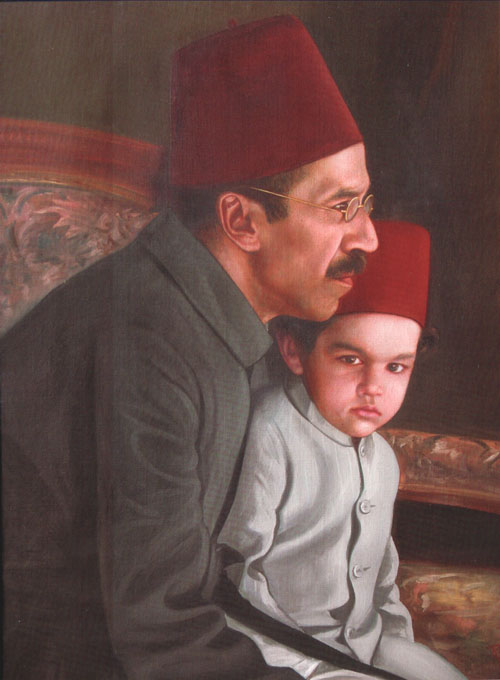
The Nizam with his heir apparent and grandson Mukarram Jah

The Nizam lived at King Kothi Palace — bought from a nobleman (Kamal Khan, an architect of those times) — from age 13 until his death. He never moved to Chowmahalla Palace, even after his accession to the throne.

Unlike his father, he was not interested in fine clothing or hunting. His hobbies rather included poetry and writing ghazals in Urdu.

He revered his mother and visited her every day she was alive; he used to visit her grave almost every day after she died.

=== Family ===
He had seven wives. His first wife was Sahibzadi Azam-un-Nisa Begum Sahiba also known as Dulhan Pasha Begum. She was the elder daughter of Nawab Jahangir Jung. They married on 14 April 1906 at Eden Bagh, Hyderabad. Nawab Khudrath Nawaz Jung was his first brother-in-law. She was the mother of his sons Azam Jah and Moazzam Jah, and a daughter Ahmed-un-Nisa Begum also known as Shahzada Pasha. She died in 1955, and was buried beside her husband in Masjid-e Judi.

Another wife was Shahzada Begum. She was the mother of Hasham Jah, who was born after her two earlier pregnancies ended in stillbirths. Another wife was Ikbal Begum. She was the daughter of his Army Secretary, Nawab Nazir Jung. Another wife was Gowhar Begum. She was a niece of the Aga Khan. Another wife was Mazhar-un-Nisa Begum. She was the youngest daughter of Khurshid-ul-Mulk, the grand-daughter in the line of the fifth Nizam, Afzal-ud-Daulah, and a niece of the sixth Nizam, Mahboob Ali Khan. They married in 1923. She died on 18 June 1964. Another wife was Leila Begum. She was a Hindu woman whose family willingly sent her to his harem as gratitude. She possessed exceptional beauty, and was his favourite wife. They had five sons - Zulfiqar Jah, Bhojat Jah, Shabbir Jah, Nawazish Jah and Fazal Jah - and two daughters Mashhadi Begum and Sayeeda Begum. His last wife was Jani Begum. She was the daughter of Sahibzada Yavar Jung, and was the mother of Imdad Jah. She died on 7 June 1959. In total, he had 34 children: 18 sons and 16 daughters.. According to the family records, Imdad Jah Bahadur had six sons and four daughters. His eldest son, Dilshad Jah Bahadur, had four children, including his eldest daughter, Asmath Unnisa Begum. Asmath Unnisa Begum is the mother of five children: two daughters, Umaiza Khan and Urwah Khan, and three sons, Umar Ullah Khan, Uzair Ullah Khan, and Umair Ullah Khan.

His first son, Azam Jah, married Durru Shehvar (daughter of the Ottoman caliph Abdul Mejid II), while his second son Moazzam Jah, married Niloufer (a niece of the Ottoman sultan).

Azam Jah and Durru Shehvar had two sons, Mukarram Jah and Muffakham Jah, with the former succeeding his grandfather as the de jure Nizam. Moazzam Jah, after his divorce from Princess Nilofer, since she couldn't bear a child, married Razia Begum and had three daughters - Princess Fatima Fouzia, Princess Amina Merzia and Princess Oolia Kulsum. He also married Anwari Begum and had a son, Prince Shahmat Jah.

Another socially prominent grandson is Mir Najaf Ali Khan, son of Hasham Jah, who represents several trusts of the last Nizam, including the H.E.H. the Nizam's Charitable Trust and the Nizam Family Welfare Association.

The Nizams' daughters had been married traditionally to young men of the House of Paigah. This family also belonged to the Sunni sect of Islam. One of his daughters Ahmed-un-Nisa Begum, by his first wife Azam-un-Nisa Begum, was once engaged to a nawab, but the Nizam suddenly called off the wedding after a traveling holy man warned him that he would not live long after her marriage. She remained unmarried, and died on 24 March 1985. Another of his daughters was Basheer-un-Nisa Begum. She was born in September 1927. She married Nawab Kazim Jung, popularly known as Ali Pasha, and had one daughter. She died at her residence, Osman Cottage, in Purani Haveli, of natural causes on 28 July 2020, aged ninety-three. She was the last surviving child of the Nizam. Another daughter Mashhadi Begum, by his wife Leila Begum, was born in September 1939. In January 1959, she married Paigah noble Mahmood Jah, and had four sons and two daughters. She died on 16 November 2015 due to chronic illness. Her funeral was performed at Masjid-e Judi, and she is buried at the Paigah Tombs, beside her husband. His youngest daughter by Leila Begum, Sayeeda Begum also known as Lily Pasha, was born on 30 December 1949. She died of a brief illness on 17 July 2017, and is buried in Masjid-e Judi. She was survived by a son and a daughter. Some other daughters were Asmat-un-Nisa Begum, Hurmat-un-Nisa Begum, Mehr-un-Nisa Begum and Masood-un-Nisa Begum.

Various parties have used the Nizam's name for political gain. A great-grandson, Himayat Ali Mirza, wrote to the prime minister in this regard along with the Election Commission of India, requesting political parties not to use Nizam's name in today's politics as it is disrespectful to such a great personality.

== Final years and death ==
The Nizam continued to stay at the King Kothi Palace until his death. He used to issue firmans on inconsequential matters in his newspaper, the Nizam Gazette.

He died on Friday, 24 February 1967. In his will, he asked to be buried in Masjid-e Judi, a mosque where his mother was buried, that faced King Kothi Palace. The government declared state mourning on 25 February 1967, the day when he was buried. State government offices remained closed as a mark of respect while the National Flag of India was flown at half-mast on all the government buildings throughout the state. The Nizam's Museum documents state:

"The streets and pavements of the city were littered with the pieces of broken glass bangles as an incalculable number of women broke their bangles in mourning, which Telangana women usually do as per Indian customs on the death of a close relative."

"The Nizam's funeral procession was the biggest non-religious, non-political meeting of people in the history of India till that date."

Millions of people of all religions from different parts of the state entered Hyderabad in trains, buses and on bullocks for a last glimpse of their king in a coffin in the King Kothi Palace Camp in Hyderabad. The crowd was so uncontrollable that barricades were installed alongside the road to enable people to move in a queue. D. Bhaskara Rao, chief curator of The Nizam's Museum, stated that an estimated one million people were part of the procession.

== Title and salutation ==
=== Salutation style ===
The Nizam was the honorary Colonel of the 20 Deccan Horse. In 1918, King George V elevated Nawab Mir Osman Ali Khan Siddiqi Bahadur from "His Highness" to "His Exalted Highness". In a letter dated 24 January 1918, the title "Faithful Ally of the British Government" was conferred on him.

=== Full Titular Name ===
The titles during his life were:

1886–1911: Nawab Bahadur Mir Osman Ali Khan Siddiqi.
1911–1912: His Highness Rustam-i-Dauran, Arustu-i-Zaman, Wal Mamaluk, Asaf Jah VII, Muzaffar ul-Mamaluk, Nizam ul-Mulk, Nizam ud-Daula, Nawab Mir Sir Osman ‘Ali Khan Siddqi Bahadur, Sipah Salar, Fath Jang, Nizam of Hyderabad, GCSI
1941–1967: General His Exalted Highness Rustam-i-Dauran, Arustu-i-Zaman, Wal Mamaluk, Asaf Jah VII, Muzaffar ul-Mamaluk, Nizam ul-Mulk, Nizam ud-Daula, Nawab Mir Sir Osman ‘Ali Khan Siddqi Bahadur, Sipah Salar, Fath Jang, Faithful Ally of the British Government, Nizam of Hyderabad and Berar, GCSI, GBE.

== Honours and eponyms ==
- Recipient of the Delhi Durbar Gold Medal, 1911 as part of the 1911 Delhi Durbar Honours,
- GCSI: Knight Grand Commander of the Order of the Star of India, 1911
- GCStJ: Bailiff Grand Cross of the Order of St John, 1911
- GBE: Knight Grand Cross of the Order of the British Empire, 1917
- Recipient of the King George V Silver Jubilee Medal, 1935
- Recipient of the King George VI Coronation Medal, 1937
- Recipient of the Royal Victorian Chain, 1946

=== List of Eponyms ===
- Osmania General Hospital
- Osmania Biscuit
- Osman Sagar, a reservoir in Hyderabad
- Osmanabad
- The Nizam of Hyderabad necklace
- The Nizam Gate of Ajmer Sharif Dargah

== See also ==
- Establishments of the Nizams
- Hospitals established by the Nizams
- Nizam's Guaranteed State Railway
- Nizams of Hyderabad
- Asaf Jahi dynasty
- Hyderabad State

== Notes ==
Mir Osman Ali Khan Asaf Jahi dynasty Born: 8 April 1886 Died: 24 February 1967
Regnal titles
Preceded by Mahbub Ali Khan, Asaf Jah VI	Nizam of Hyderabad; 1911–1948	Annexed by Dominion of India
Titles in pretence
New title	— TITULAR — Nizam of Hyderabad; 1948–1967	Succeeded by Barkat Ali Khan, Asaf Jah VIII
Government offices
Preceded by Mir Yousuf Ali Khan, Salar Jung III	Prime Minister of Hyderabad; 1914–1919	Succeeded by Sir Sayyid Ali Imam
