= Mukarram Jah =

Titular Nizam of Hyderabad (1967–2023)

Mir Barakat Ali Khan
- Asaf Jah VIII
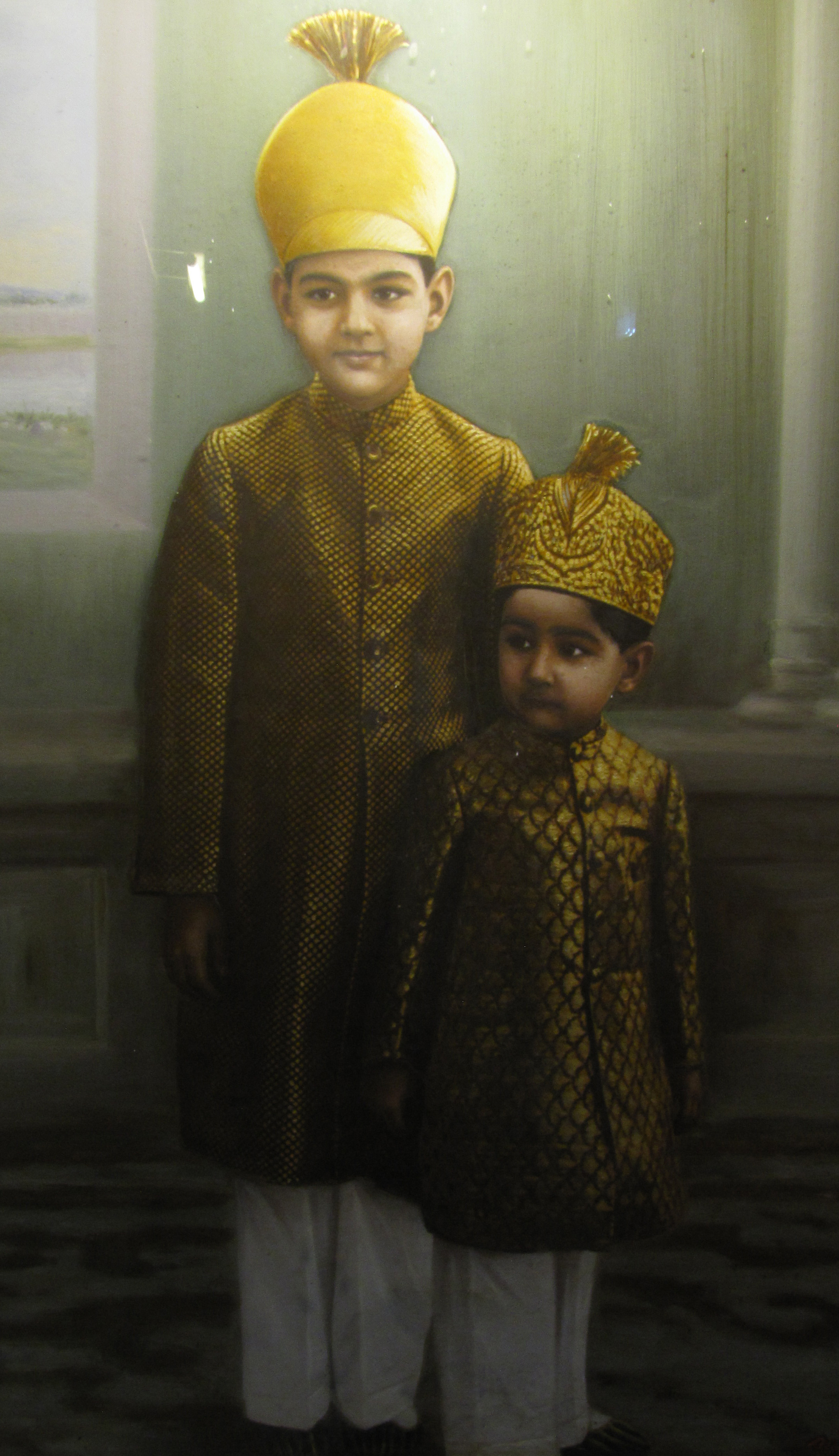
- Mukarram Jah with his younger brother Muffakham Jah

8th Nizam of Hyderabad (titular)
- Reign: 24 February 1967 – 5 November 1971 (pretender 1971–2023)
- Coronation: 6 April 1967
- Predecessor: Mir Osman Ali Khan, Asaf Jah VII
- Successor: Position abolished Azmet Jah (pretender)
- Born: 6 October 1933; Hilafet Palace, Nice, France
- Died: 15 January 2023 (aged 89); Istanbul, Turkey
- Burial: 18 January 2023; Makkah Masjid, Hyderabad, Telangana, India
- Spouse: Princess Esra Birgin (1959–1974; divorced); Aysha Simmons (1979–1989; widowed); Manolya Onur (1992–1997; divorced); Jameela Boularous (co-wife) (since 1992); Princess Ayesha Orchedi (co-wife) (since 1994)
- Issue: Azmet Jah, Crown Prince of Hyderabad; Princess Shehryar; Prince Alexander Azam Khan; Prince Mohammad Amzad Hussain Khan; Prince Mohammad Umar Khan; Princess Nilufer; Princess Zairin
- House: House of Asaf Jah
- Father: Azam Jah
- Mother: Dürrüşehvar Sultan
- Religion: Sunni Islam

Nizam Mir Barkat Ali Khan Siddiqi Mukarram Jah, Asaf Jah VIII (6 October 1933 – 15 January 2023), less formally known as Mukarram Jah, was the titular Nizam of Hyderabad between 1967 and 1971. He was the head of the House of Asaf Jah until he died in 2023.

Born as the eldest son of Azam Jah and Dürrüşehvar Sultan, he was named successor to the title of Nizam of Hyderabad by his grandfather Mir Osman Ali Khan. Upon Osman's death in 1967, he became the titular Nizam. He lost his titles and the privy purses in 1971 when the 26th Amendment to the Indian constitution was passed.

Jah subsequently moved to Australia, where he stayed at the Murchison House Station. While the prince remained in Australia, his palaces in Hyderabad were encroached upon and fell into disrepair. Numerous divorce settlements and failed business ventures led to the loss of the majority of his fortune. In 1996, he moved to Turkey where he remained until he died in 2023. Jah was buried in Hyderabad.

Jah chaired the H.E.H. The Nizam's Charitable Trust and Mukarram Jah Trust for Education & Learning (MJTEL) Mukarram Jah High School.

== Biography ==
=== Early life and education ===
Mukarram Jah was born to Azam Jah, the son and heir of Osman Ali Khan, the last reigning Nizam of Hyderabad state, by his wife Dürrüşehvar Sultan, daughter of the last Caliph of the Ottoman dynasty, Abdulmejid II. His younger brother is Muffakham Jah.

Jah was educated in India at the Doon School in Dehradun and in England at Harrow and Peterhouse, Cambridge. He also studied at the London School of Economics and at the Royal Military Academy Sandhurst.

Jah stayed at Teen Murti Bhavan in New Delhi for a while and briefly served as an honorary aide-de-camp of Jawaharlal Nehru. He stated in 2010 that Nehru had wanted him to become his personal envoy or the Indian ambassador to a Muslim country.

=== Nizam of Hyderabad ===
He became the titular Nizam of Hyderabad after the death of his grandfather in 1967.

=== Life in Australia and Turkey ===
In 1972, he visited Australia and came across the Murchison House Station, a pastoral property of 350,000 acres on the west coast, near Kalbarri. He bought the farm and permanently moved to Australia. He also purchased Havelock House, a mansion in Perth.

In 1996, he sold the farm and moved to Turkey shortly after.

His two main palaces in Hyderabad, Chowmahalla and Falaknuma, have been restored and opened to the public, the former as a museum showcasing the era of the Nizams and the latter as a luxury hotel. The Taj Falaknuma Palace Hotel opened in February 2010, having been leased to the Taj Group, after some ten years of renovations.

Like his grandfather, Mukarram was the richest man in India until the 1980s. However, in the 1990s, he lost some assets to divorce settlements. His net worth is nevertheless estimated at $US 2 billion.

=== Death and funeral ===
Jah died on 15 January 2023, at the age of 89. Per Jah's wishes, his funeral took place in Hyderabad which was the former capital of Hyderabad State and of the Nizam of Hyderabad, on 18 January 2023.

His remains were laid in state at the Chowmahalla Palace, where family members and government officials paid their respects. In the evening of 18 January, he was buried at the Mecca Masjid.

== Personal life ==
=== Marriages ===
Mukarram Jah married five times. His first wife was a Turkish noblewoman, Esra Birgin (b. 1936), and they married in 1959. Jah left his Hyderabad palace for a sheep station in the Australian outback and divorced his wife, who did not want to move with him. In 1979, he married a former air hostess and employee of the BBC, Helen Simmons (b. 1949 – d. 1989); she converted to Islam and changed her name to Aysha. After her death, he married Manolya Onur (b. 1954 – d. 2017), a former Miss Turkey in 1992, and divorced her after a five-year marriage in 1997.

He married Jameela Boularous (b. 1972), from Morocco, in 1992. In 1994, he married Princess Ayesha Orchedi (b. 1959), who is Turkish.

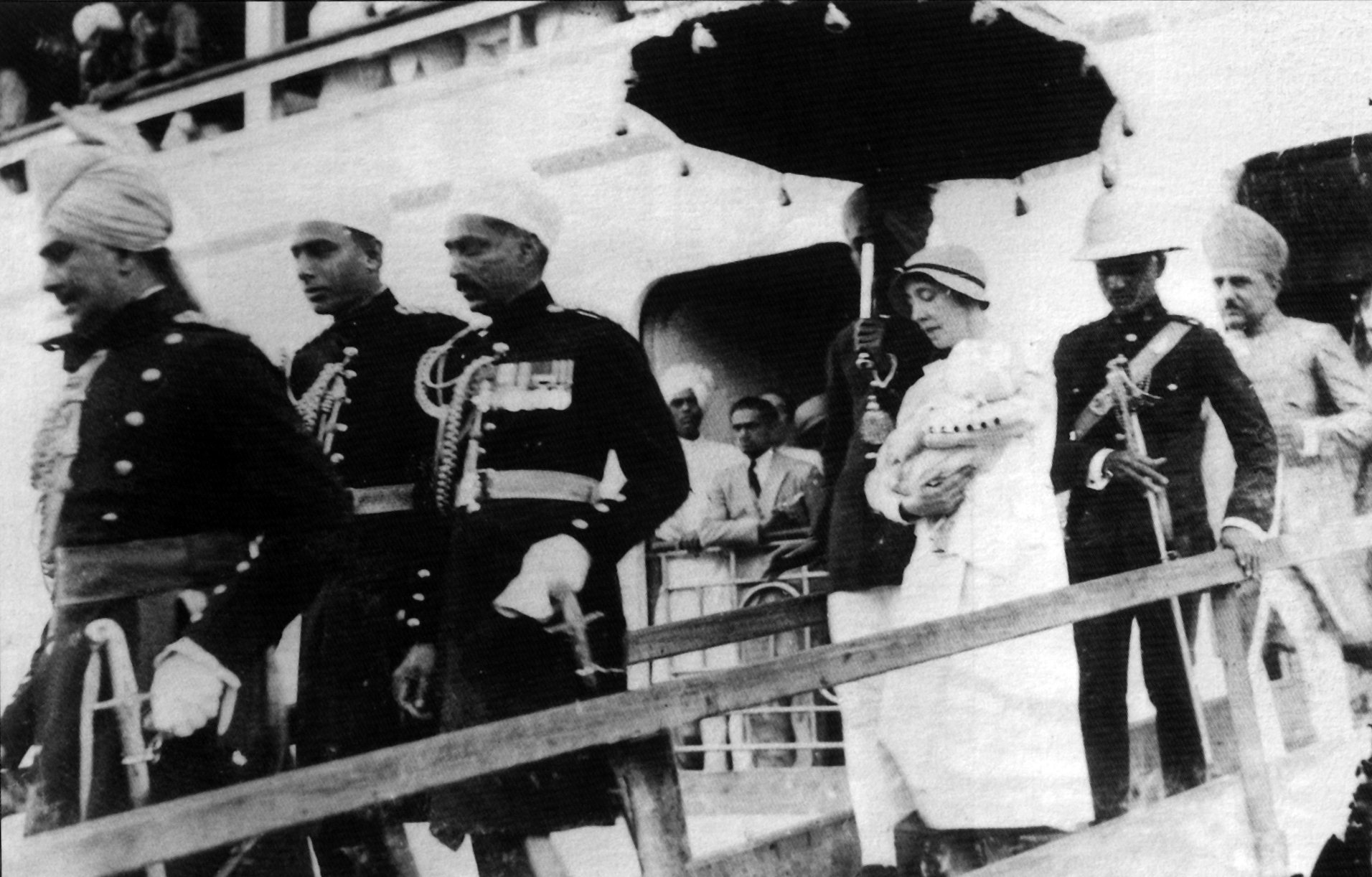
Nanny carrying the prince from board after arrival in Bombay, 1934

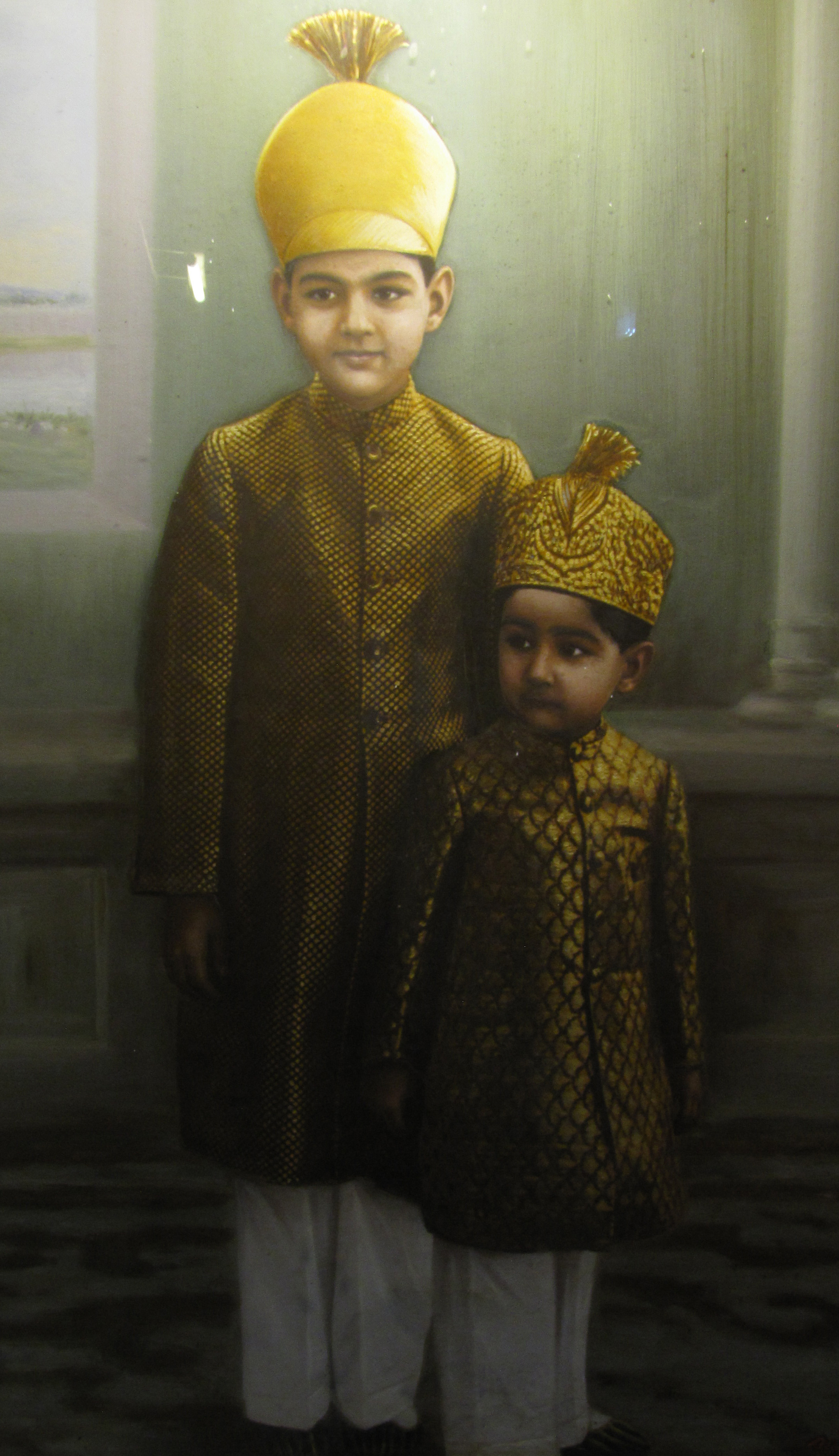
Mukarram Jah with his younger brother Muffakham Jah

=== Children ===
By Esra Birgin, Mukarram Jah had one son and one daughter:

- Walashan Nawab Sahibzada Mir Azmat Ali Khan Siddiqi Bayafendi Bahadur (b. 1960), also known as Azmat Jah, married in 1994 to Princess Begum Sahiba Zainab Naz Jah (née Zeynep Naz Guvendiren) and has one son, has worked as a cameraman.
  - Murad Jah
- Sahibzadi Shehkyar Unisa Begum (b. 1964), unmarried and without issue

By Helen Simmons, he had two sons:

- Walashan Nawab Sahibzada Mir Alexander Azam Khan Siddiqi Bayafendi Bahadur (b. 1979)
- Walashan Nawab Sahibzada Mir Mohammad Umar Khan Siddiqi Bayafendi Bahadur (1984-2004) deceased due to drug overdose

By Manolya Onur he had a daughter:

- Sahebzadi Nilufer Unisa Begum/Nilufer Elif Jah (b. 1992)

By Jameela Boularous he had a daughter:

- Sahebzadi Zairin Unisa Begum (b. 1994)

== Full style ==
His Exalted Highness Prince Rustam-i-Dauran, Arustu-i-Zaman, Wal Mamaluk, Asaf Jah VIII, Muzaffar ul-Mamalik, Nizam ul-Mulk, Nizam ud-Daula, Nawab Mir Barakat 'Ali Khan Siddiqi Bahadur, Sipah Salar, Fath Jang, Nizam of Hyderabad and Berar.

Military titles

Honorary Lieutenant-General

== Palaces ==
The palaces he owned:

- Chowmahalla Palace, Hyderabad.
- Falaknuma Palace, Hyderabad.
- Nazribagh Palace, Hyderabad.
- Naukhanda Palace, Aurangabad.
- Chiraan Palace, Banjara Hills, Hyderabad.
- Purani Haveli Hyderabad (Mukarram Jah Trust for Education and Learning).

=== Complaint against Mukarram Jah ===
Nawab Najaf Ali Khan, another grandson of 7th Nizam, met the Police Commissioner of Hyderabad and submitted a complaint along with supporting documents alleging that Prince Mukarram Jah, his ex-wife Princess Esra (who also holds the General Power of Attorney (GPA) of Prince Mukarram Jah), his son Prince Azmat Jah and his brother Prince Muffakham Jah had used false documents in the UK High Court to lay claim over the £35 million Nizam’s Fund lying in NatWest Bank there.

== See also ==
- H.E.H. the Nizam's Charitable Trust
- Mir Osman Ali Khan
- Mir Najaf Ali Khan - cousin of Mukarram Jah
- Kingdom of Hyderabad
- Nizam of Hyderabad – Historic monarch of the Hyderabad State of India

Mukarram Jah Asaf Jahi dynasty Born: 6 October 1933 Died: 15 January 2023
Titles in pretence
Preceded by Osman Ali Khan, Asif Jah VII	— TITULAR — Nizam of Hyderabad; Titular; 1967 – 1971; Reason for succession failure: Indian annexation of Hyderabad	Title abolished by 26th Amendment
Loss of title Recognition of title withdrawn	— TITULAR — Nizam of Hyderabad; Pretence; 1971 – 2023; Reason for succession failure: 26th Amendment to the Constitution of India	Succeeded by Azmet Jah
