= Chowmahalla Palace =

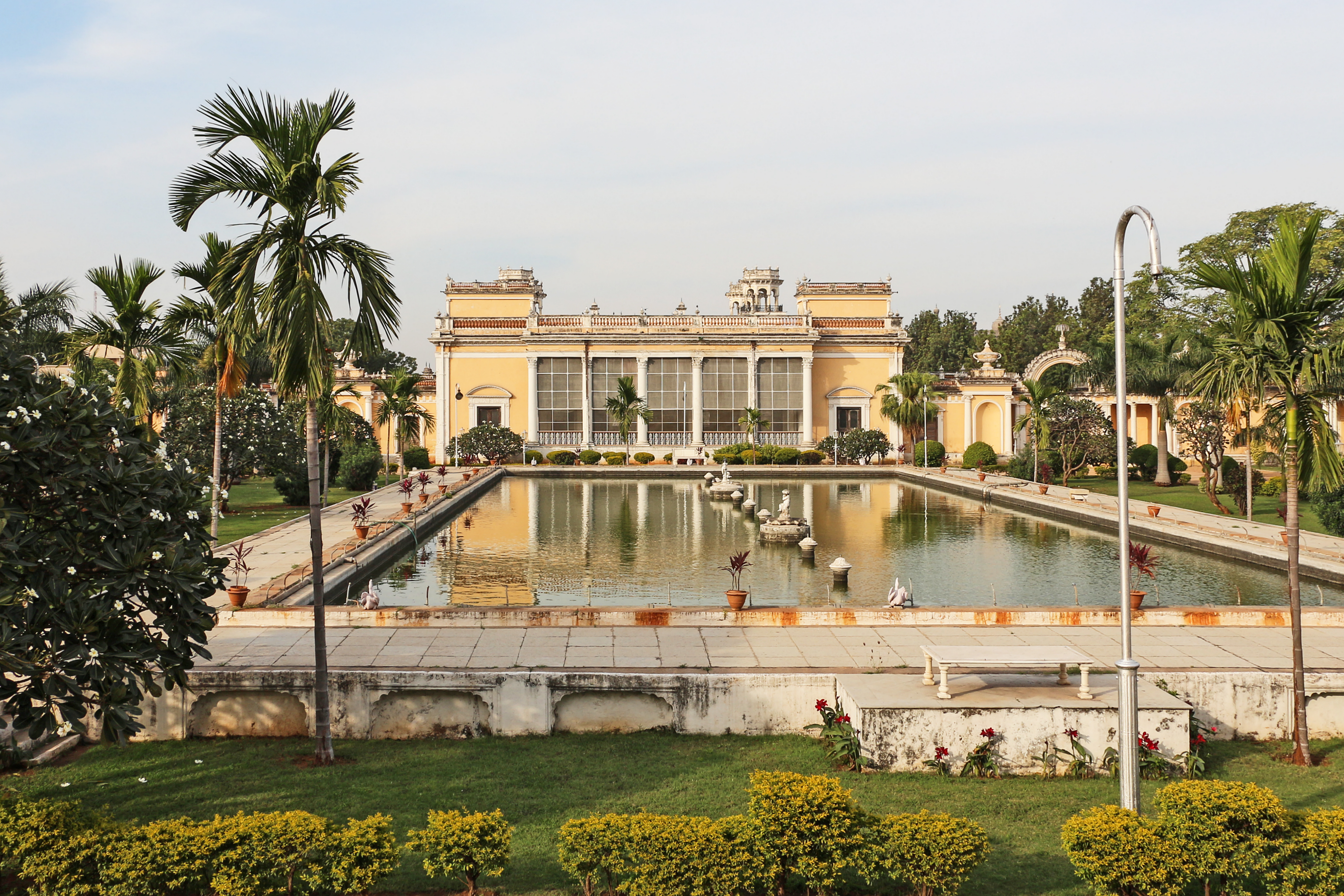
- Afzal Mahal, Chowmahalla Palace

- Location within Hyderabad

General information
- Type: Royal palace
- Location: Hyderabad, Telangana, India
- Coordinates: 17.358247°N 78.471701°E
- Construction started: 1750
- Completed: 1880s

Design and construction
- Awards: National Tourism Award (Best Maintained and Differently abled Friendly Monument), 2017

History
- Original use: Seat of the Nizam of Hyderabad

Site notes
- Restored: 2005–2010
- Restored by: Princess Esra
- Owner: Azmet Jah

Chowmahalla Palace or Chowmahallat is the palace of the Nizams of Hyderabad State located in Hyderabad, Telangana, India. It was the seat of power of the Asaf Jahi dynasty (1720–1948) and was the official residence of the Nizams during their reign. The palace has been converted into a museum and the ownership still lies with the family.

The palace was constructed at the location of an earlier palace of the Qutb Shahi dynasty and Asaf Jahi dynasty close to the Charminar. Construction of the palace, as it stands today, was started by Nizam Ali Khan Asaf Jah II in 1769. He ordered the building of four palaces from which the nomenclature of Chau Mahalla is derived. The word chār or chahār, and its variation chow, means "four" and the word mahal means "palace" in Urdu, Hindi and Persian.

== History ==
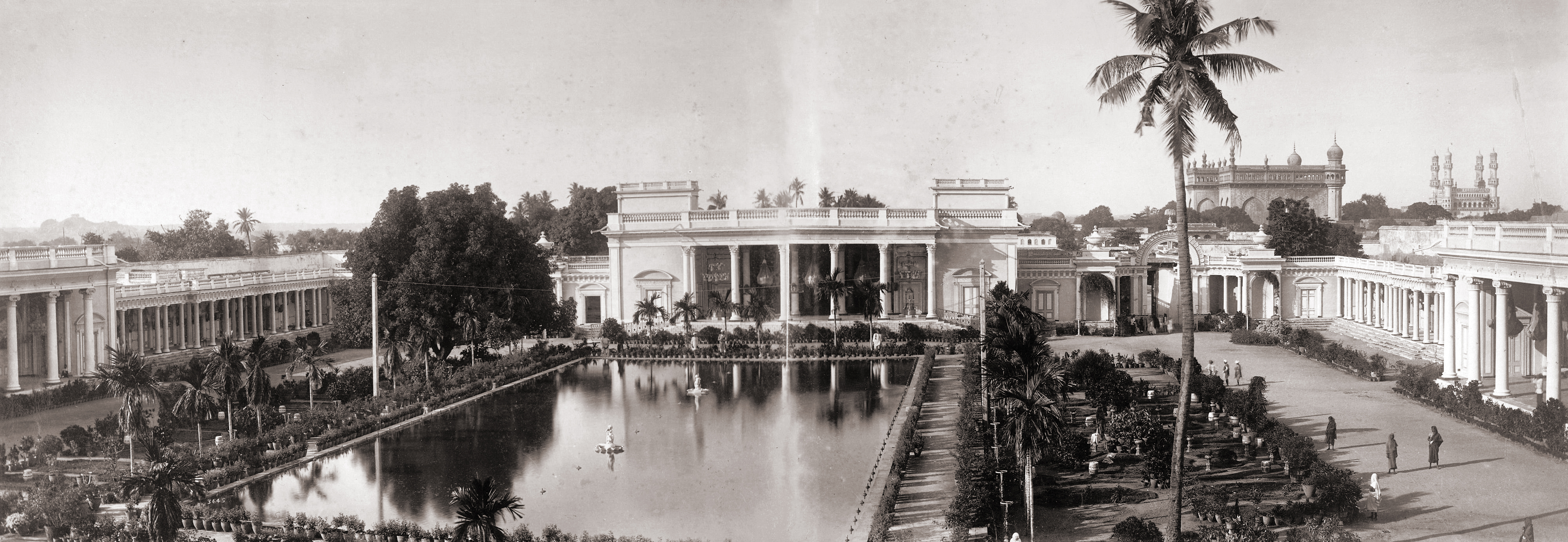
Panoramic view in two parts of the Chowmahalla Palace at Hyderabad, photographed by Deen Dayal in the 1880s. The Charminar and Mecca Masjid are seen in the background (far right).

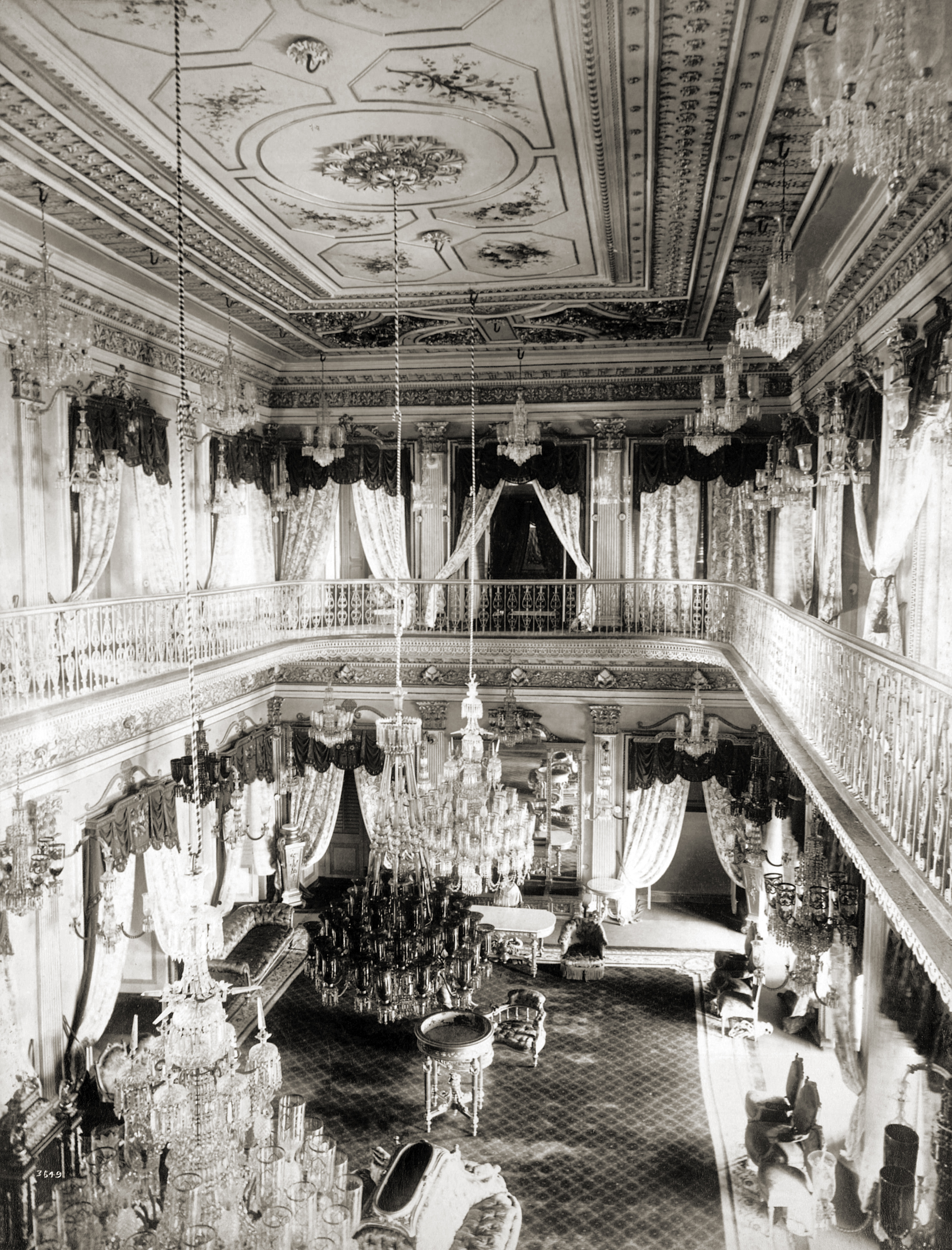
Drawing room

While Salabat Jung initiated its construction in 1750, the palace was completed by the period of Afzal ad-Dawlah, Asaf Jah V between 1857 and 1869.

The palace is unique for its style and elegance. Construction began in the late 18th century and over the decades a synthesis of many architectural styles and influences emerged. The palace consists of two courtyards as well as the grand Khilwat (the Darbar Hall), fountains and gardens. The palace originally covered 45 acres (180,000 m^{2}), but only 12 acres (49,000 m^{2}) remain today.

== Southern courtyard ==
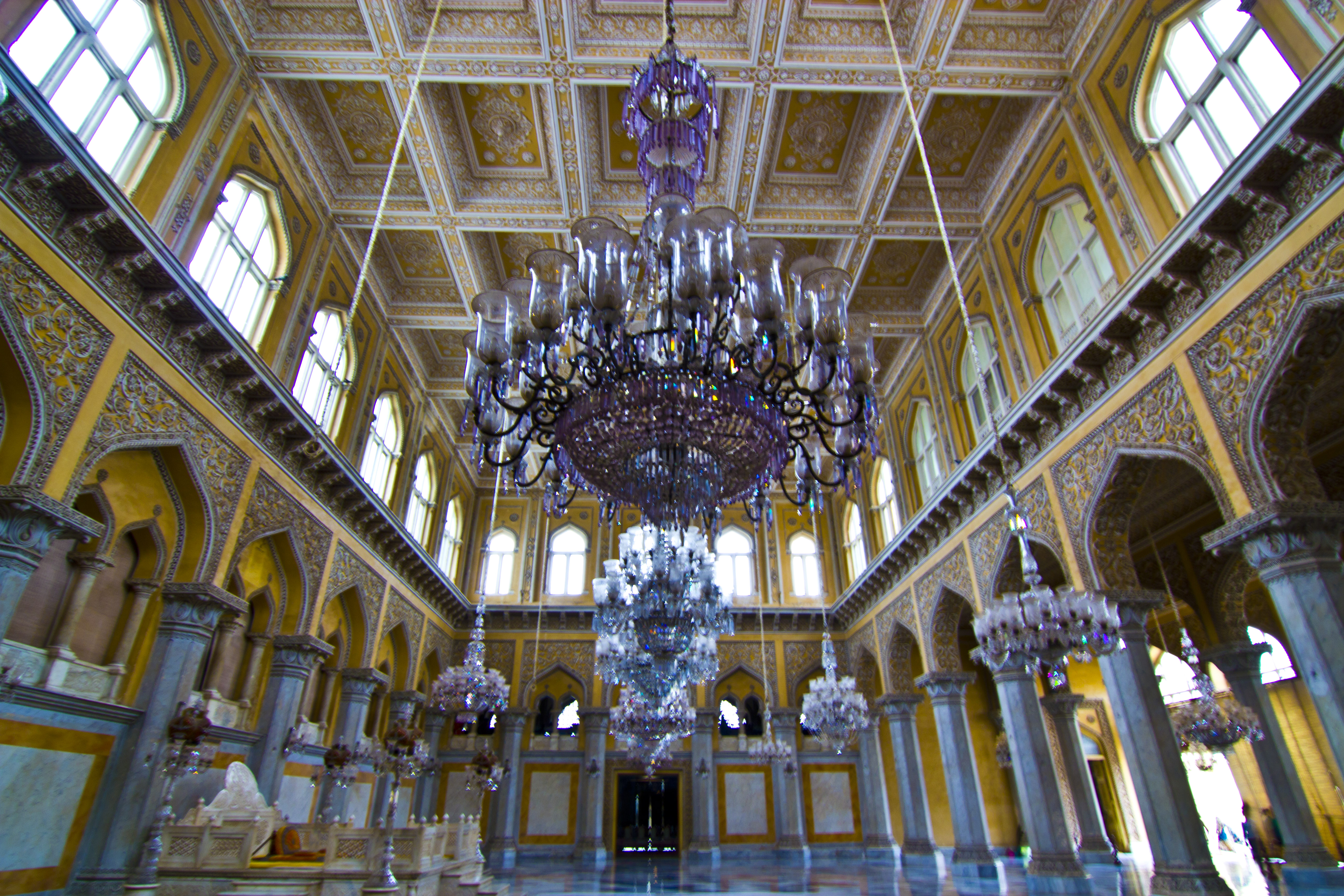
Interior with chandeliers

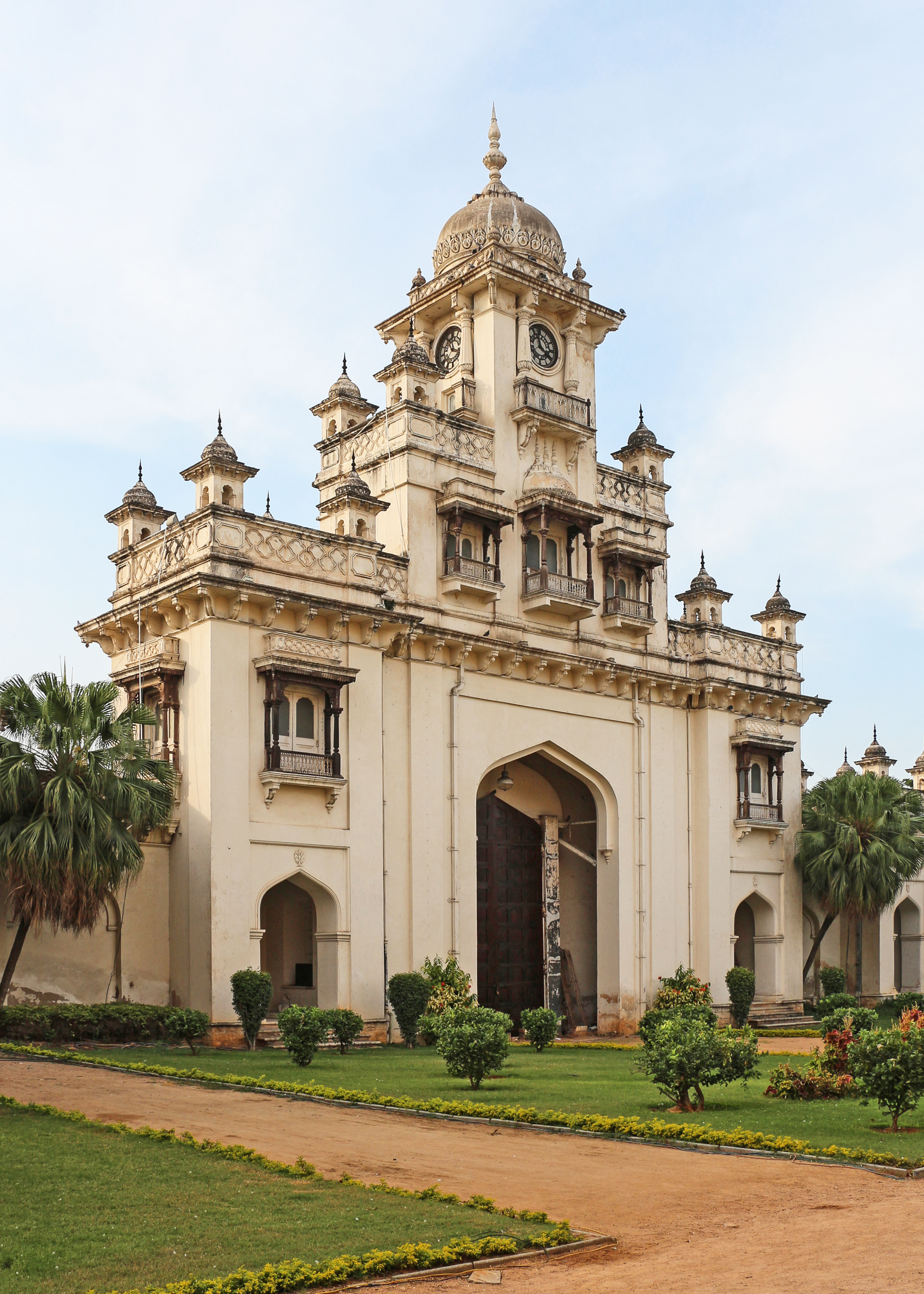
Watch tower gate

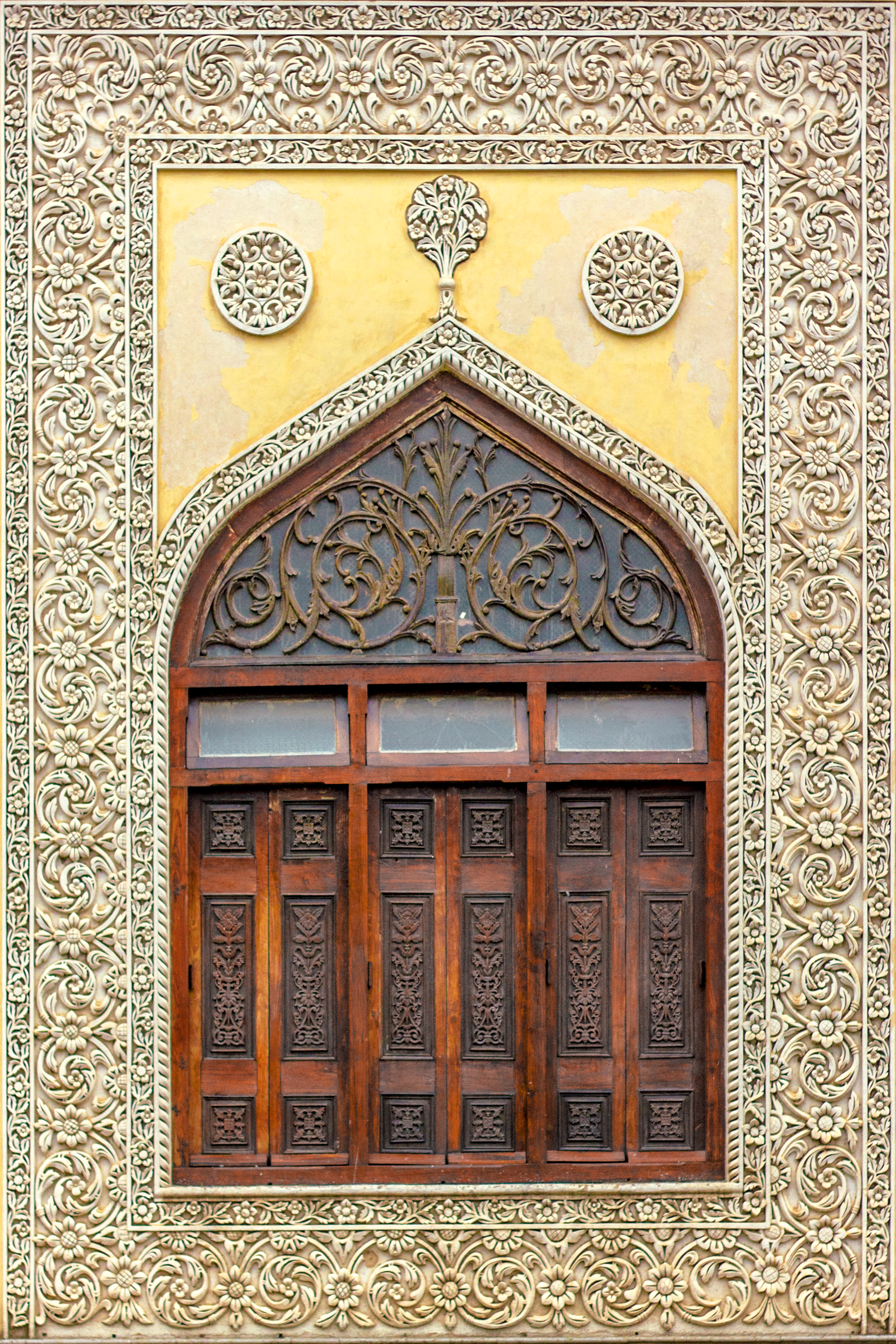
Ornate with intricate stucco work, this is one of the two windows that flank the facade of the durbar hall.

This is the oldest part of the palace, consisting of four palaces: Afzal Mahal, Mahtab Mahal, Tahniyat Mahal and Aftab Mahal, built symmetrically opposite each other in Neoclassical style. The forecourt between the palaces is adorned with a pond and a garden.

The neoclassical palaces have double-height verandahs or façades lined with European style columns. The columns in the Aftab Mahal and Mehtab Mahal are of Ionic order whereas the Afzal Mahal and Tehniyat Mahal have Corinthian columns.

== Northern courtyard ==
This part has Bara Imam, a long corridor of rooms on the east side facing the central fountain and pool that once housed the administrative wing; and Shishe-Alat, meaning mirror image.

It has Mughal domes and arches and many Persian elements such as the ornate stucco works that adorn the Khilwat Mubarak. These were characteristic of buildings built in Hyderabad at the time.

Opposite the Bara Imam is a building that is its shishe or mirror image. The rooms were once used as guest rooms for officials accompanying visiting dignitaries.

== Khilwat Mubarak ==
Described as "the heart of Chowmahalla Palace", it is held in high esteem by the people of Hyderabad, as it was the seat of the Asaf Jahi dynasty. The grand pillared Durbar Hall has a pure marble platform on which the Takht-e-Nishan or the royal seat was laid. Here the Nizams held their durbar and other religious and symbolic ceremonies. The 19 chandeliers of Belgian crystal were recently reinstalled to recreate the lost splendour of this regal hall.

=== Clock tower ===
The main gateway to the Chowmahalla Palace on the western hand has a clock tower also known as a Khilafat clock. The tower is three storeys high and consists of balconies and jharokha of Mughal style same as the style of half domes. It has been ticking since 1750. An expert family of horologists winds the mechanical clock every week.

=== Council hall ===
This building housed a rare collection of manuscripts and priceless books. The Nizam often met important officials and dignitaries here. Today it is a venue for temporary exhibitions from the treasures of the Chowmahalla Palace Collection of the bygone era.

=== Roshan Bangla ===
The Sixth Nizam, Mir Mahbub Ali Khan, is believed to have lived here and the building was named after his mother Roshan Begum.

The former Nizam (Barkat Ali Khan Mukarram Jah) and his family decided to restore the Chowmahalla Palace and open it to the public in January 2005. It took over five years to document and restore the palaces of the first courtyard to its former glory. The palace also has a collection of vintage cars, including the Rolls-Royce, which the Nizam kings used.

== Museum ==
The displays in the museum depict the origin and evolution of Hyderabad, achievements and valuable contribution of the Nizams towards the development of the state, and the social lifestyle of the royal family.

The museum is divided into parts arranged around two quadrangle courtyards in North and South.

== Conservation ==
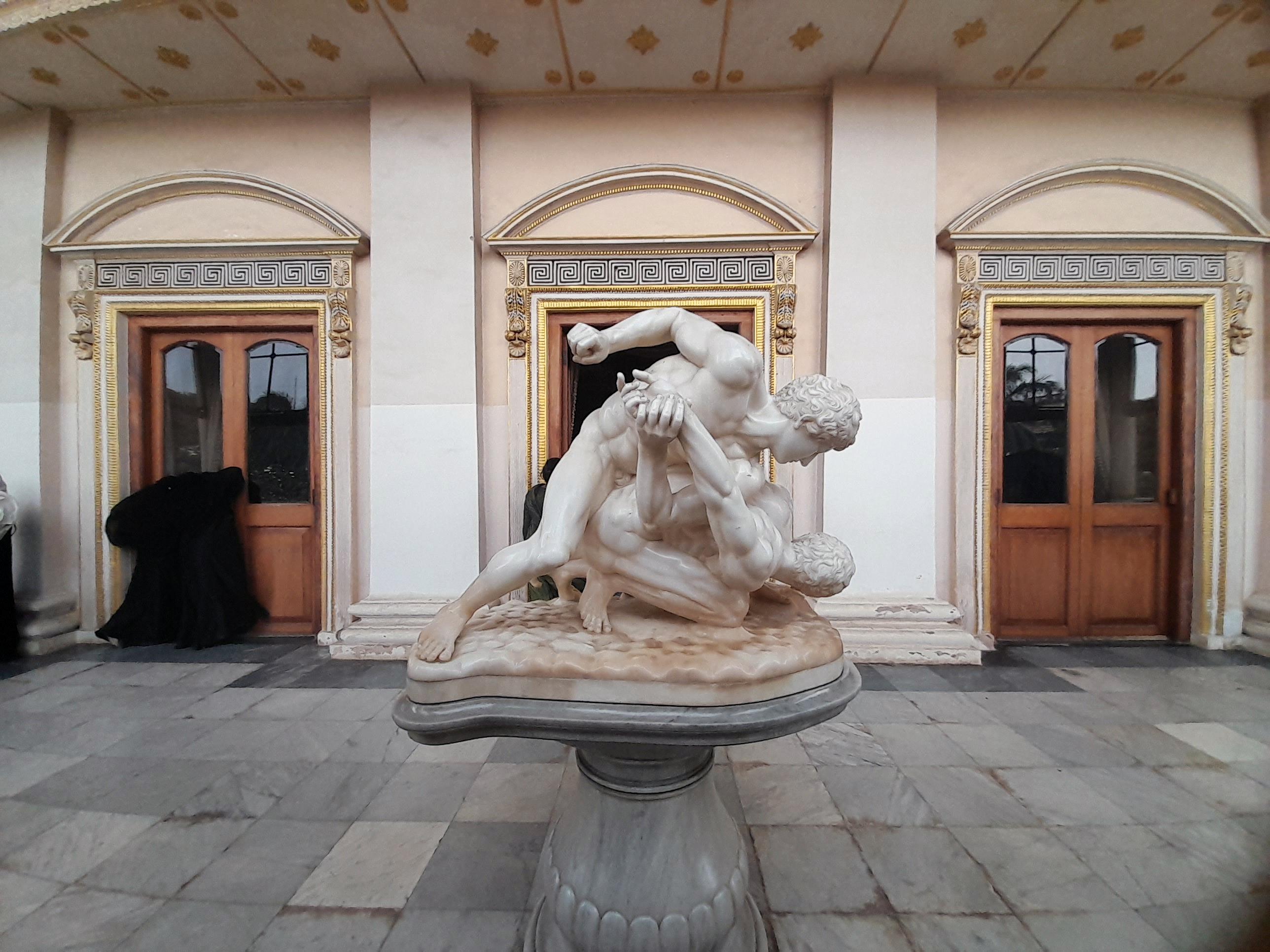
Marble statue of wrestlers, Afzal Mahal

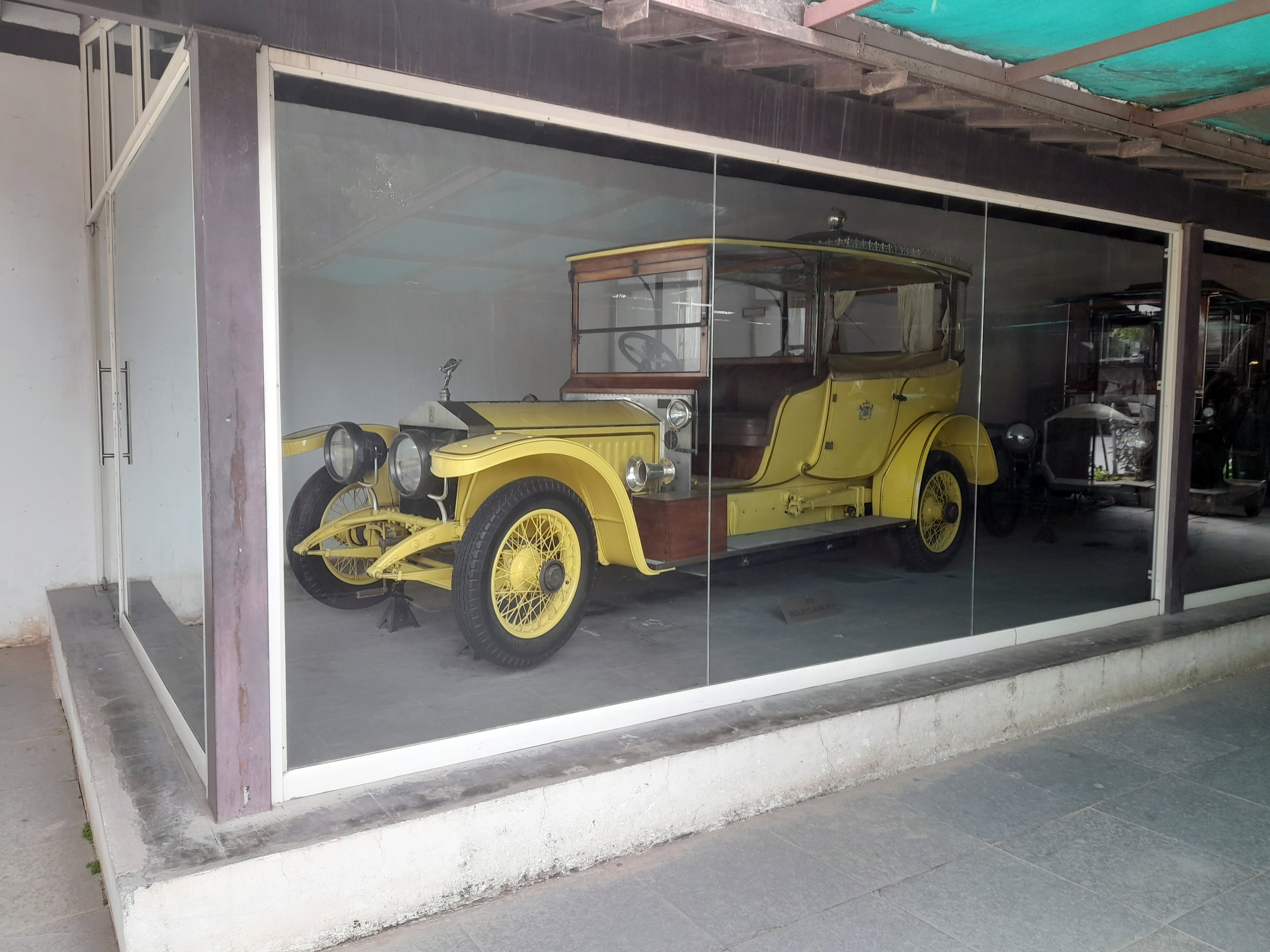
Vintage cars at Chowmahalla Palace

Conservation works were initiated in Chowmahalla Palace from 2000, where several conservation architects and experts were involved in more than a decade long journey. The initiative was undertaken by Princess Esra Birgen. Before commencement of the works, the place had fallen into disuse for a prolonged period and had deteriorated over the time. The vision for the restoration project was to rescue the exemplary palatial complex and to establish a contemporary civic use as a museum showcasing the splendour and valour of the erstwhile Nizams.

The restoration process was divided into three stages, first stage involved thorough mapping, a fabric survey, and the development of conservation plans for the buildings' restoration as well as alternative re-use scenarios that might help assess the practicality of these historic buildings. In the second stage, structures that were in danger of collapsing had to be stabilised, and other urgent repairs like waterproofing and propping had to be made to prevent further damage. The complex's physical restoration as well as the addition of amenities to encourage the reuse of these structures were part of the final phase.

In order to preserve the integrity of these ancient structures, their conservation was carried out using traditional craftsmen and techniques, and several building components were saved from demolition. Many architectural features, including granite arches, elaborate lime plaster work, and terracotta balusters, were restored carefully in their original design in addition to structural repairs and stabilisation. Apart from bringing back the past glory of the palace complex and reviving traditional materials and craftsmanship, the project also created a cultural oasis in the heart of the city.

The project was awarded the UNESCO Asia Pacific Merit award for cultural heritage conservation on 15 March 2010. UNESCO representative Takahiko Makino formally handed over the plaque and certificate to Princess Esra, former wife and GPA holder of Prince Mukarram Jah Bahadur.

== Gallery ==
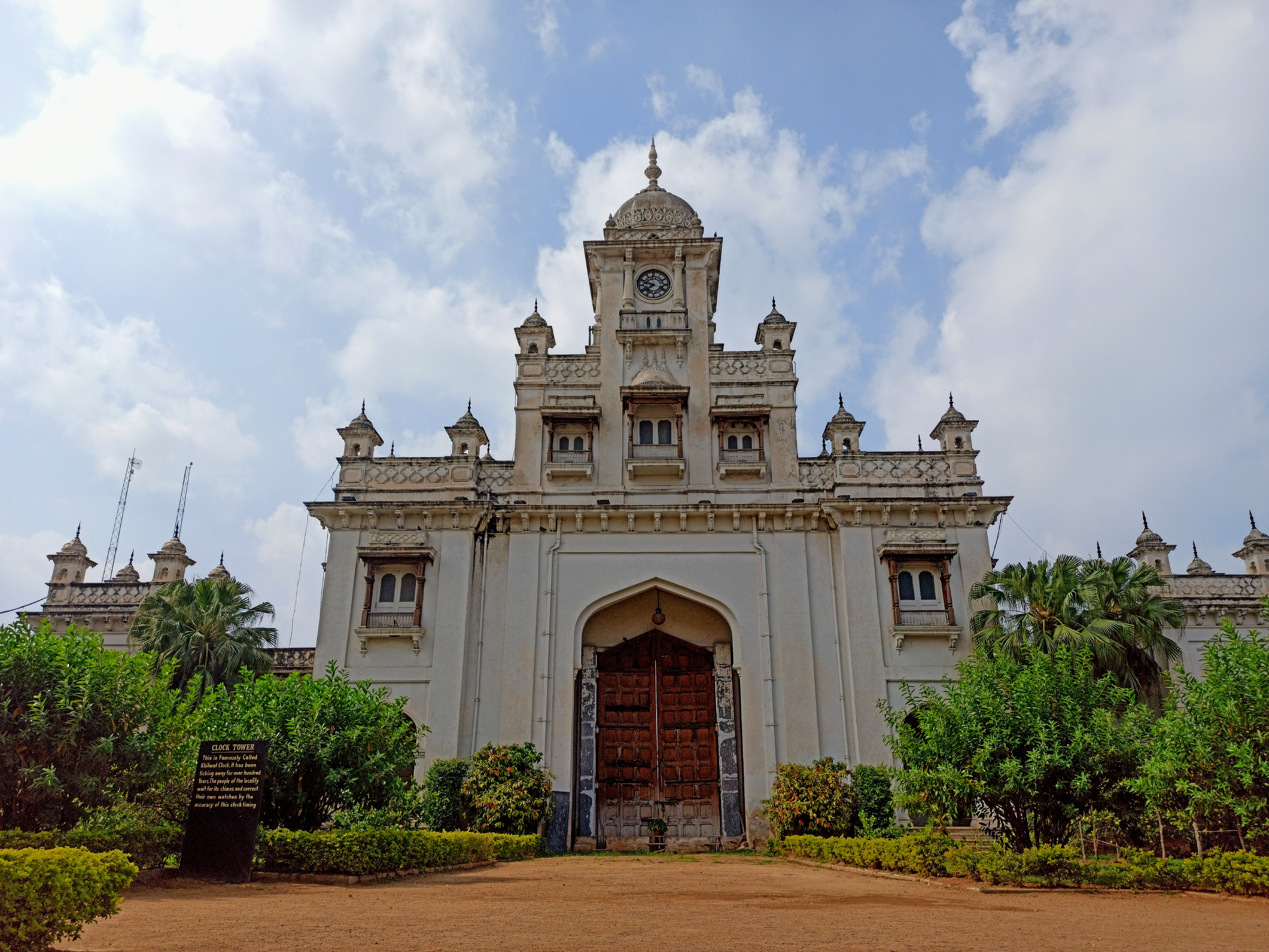
Clock tower at Chowmahalla Palace

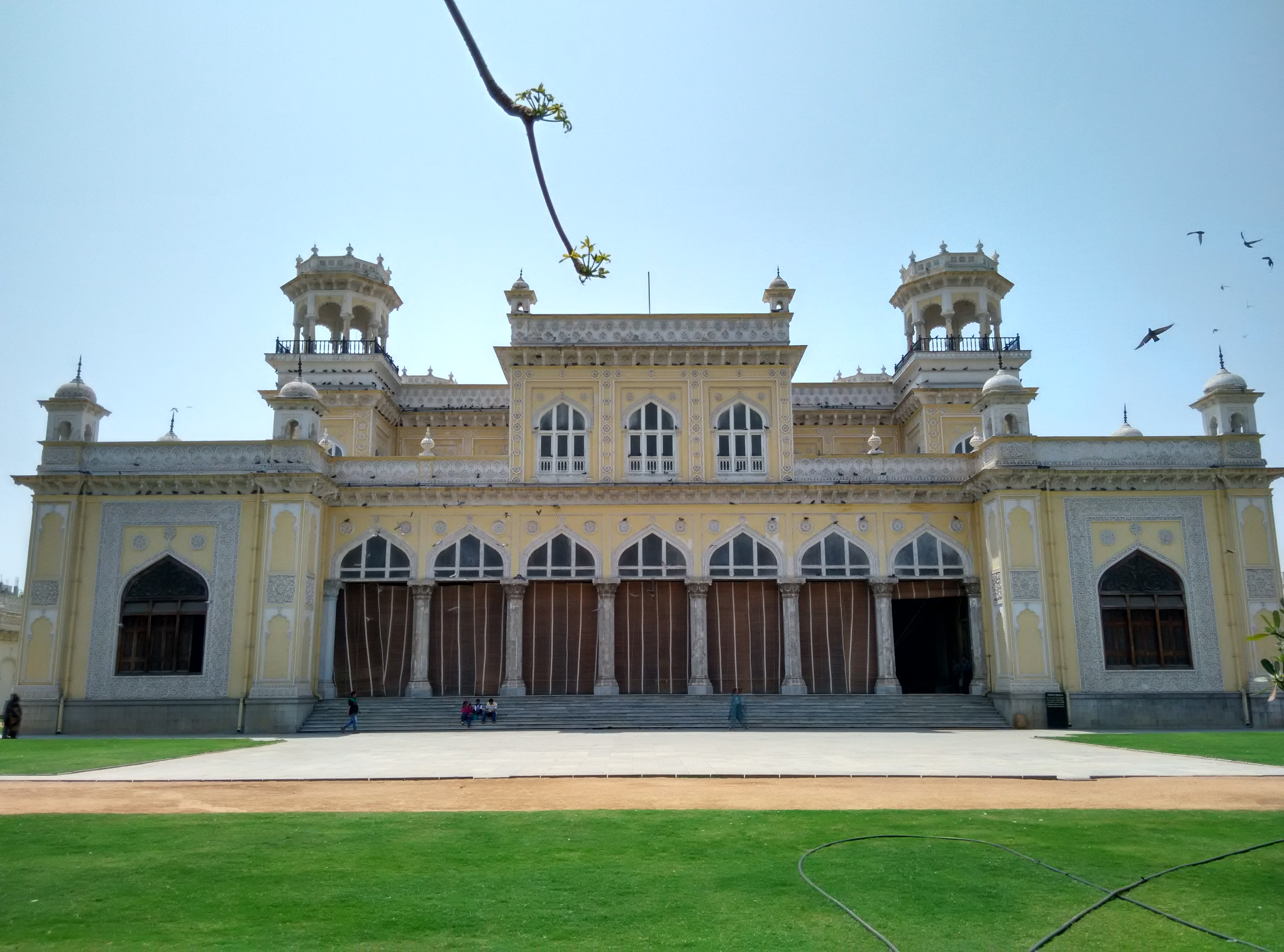
Khilwat Mubarak

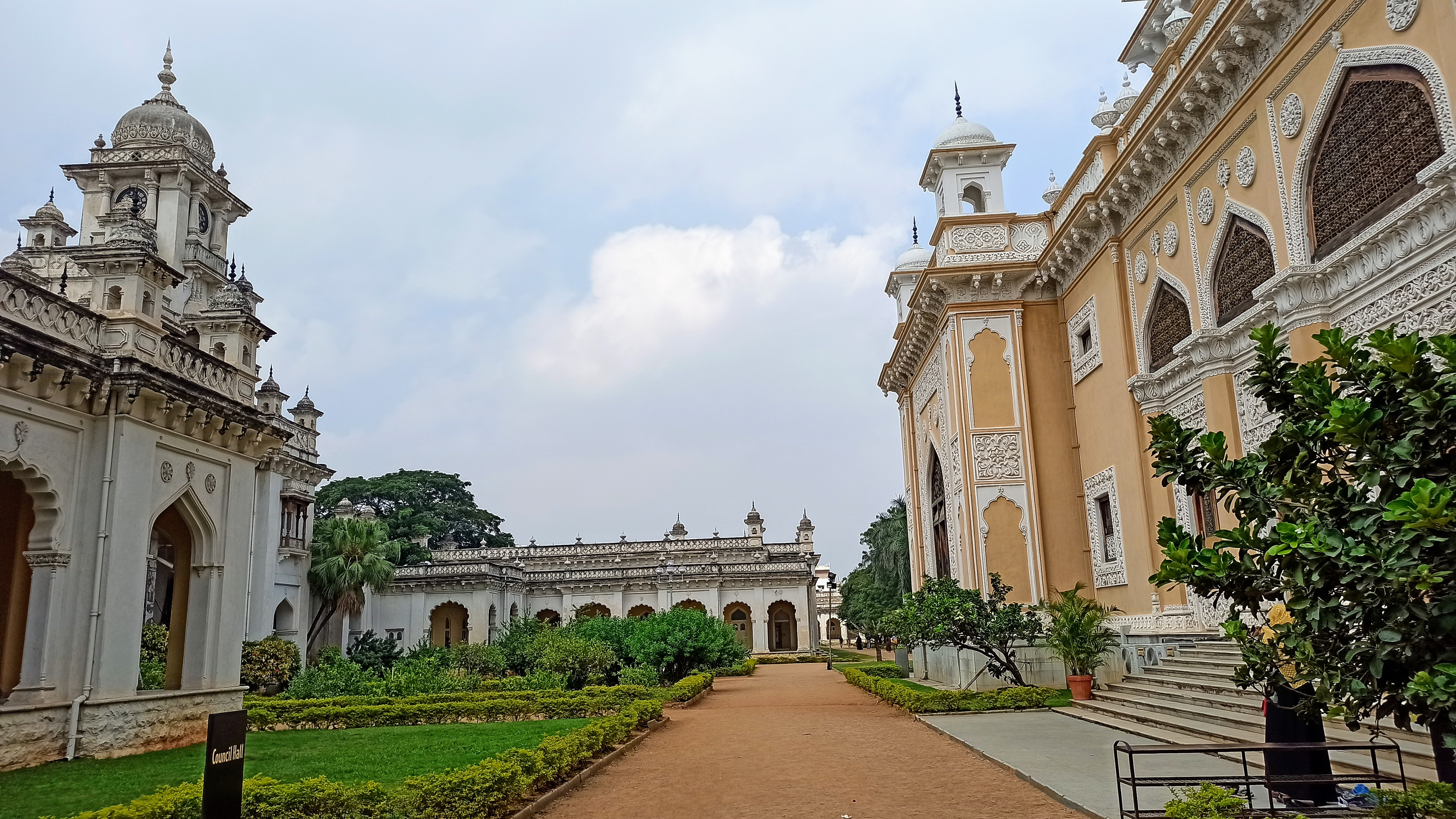

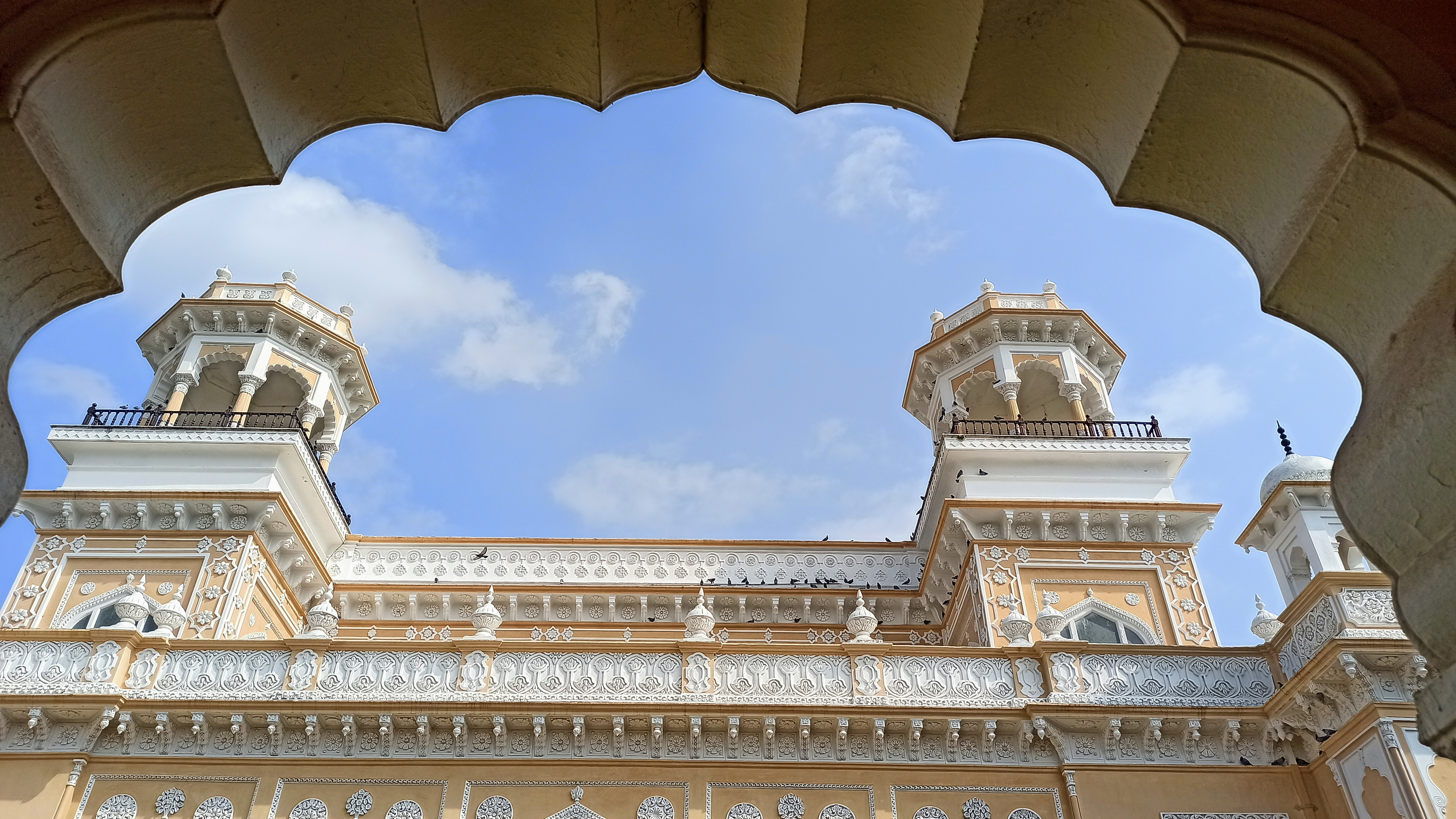

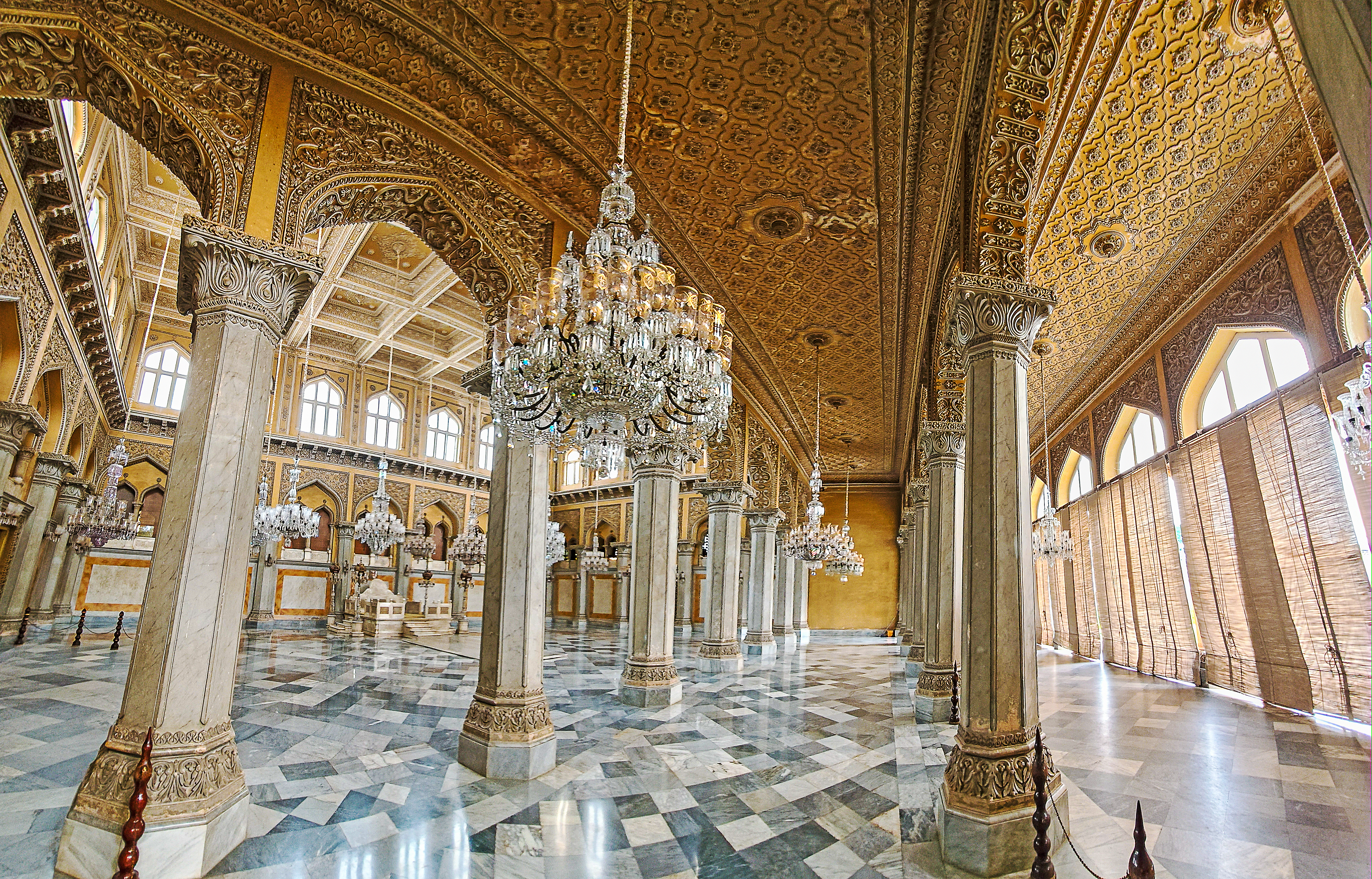
Chowmahalla Palace Council Hall Interior

== See also ==
- Nizam of Hyderabad
- Purani Haveli
- Falaknuma Palace
- King Kothi
- Chiran Palace
- Jewels of the Nizams
- Jacob Diamond
- Basheer Bagh Palace
