= Mir Najaf Ali Khan =

Grandson of the last ruler of Hyderabad

Nawab Mir Najaf Ali Khan
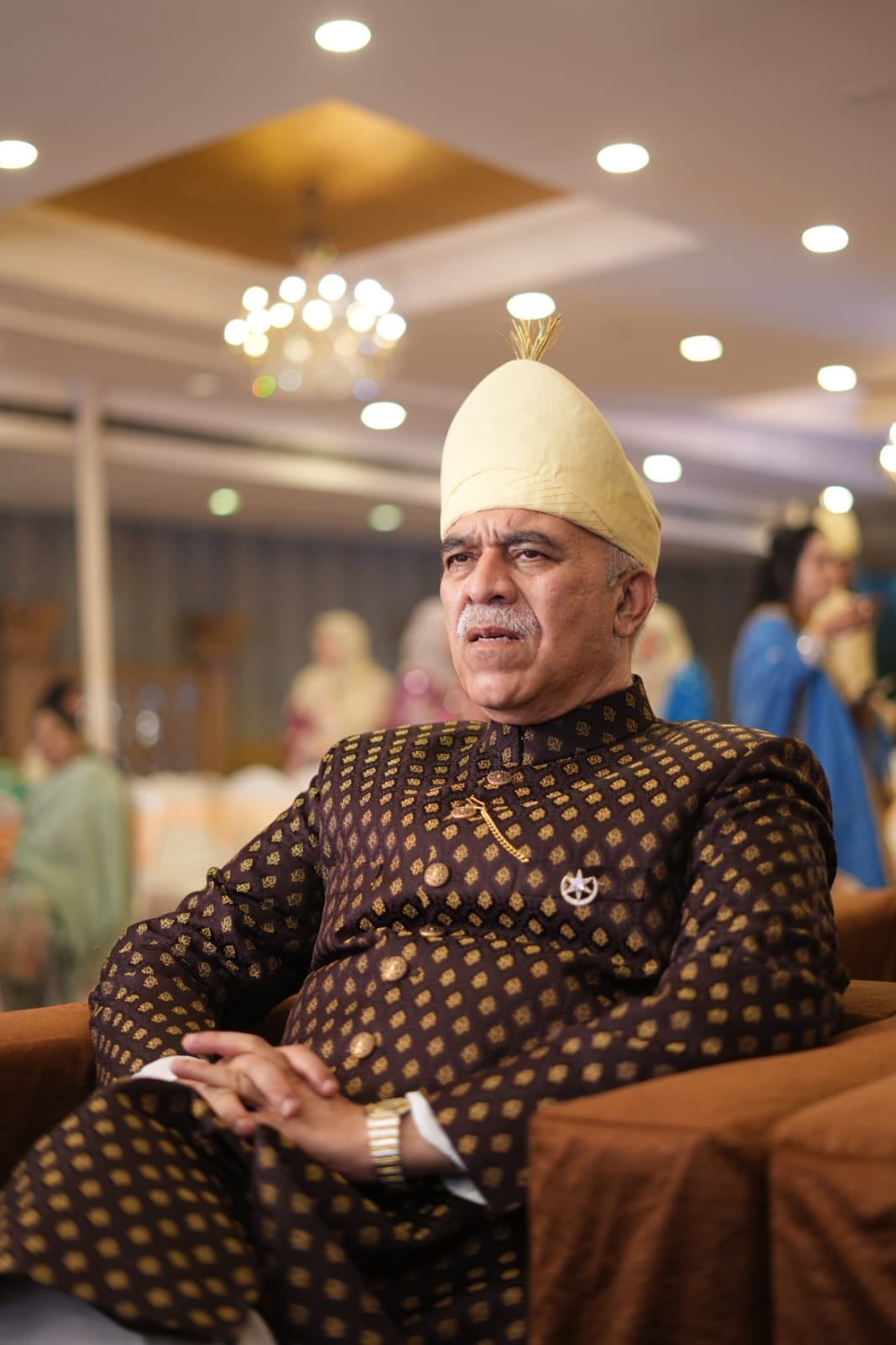
- Born: 1964 (age 61–62)
- Relatives: Mir Osman Ali Khan (grandfather); Mukarram Jah (cousin)
- Family: Asaf Jahi dynasty

Nawab Mir Najaf Ali Khan is the grandson of the last Nizam of Hyderabad, Mir Osman Ali Khan and is involved in heritage conservation, social initiatives, and legal representation of the Nizam's descendants.

He has been involved in the conservation of Hyderabadi Heritage, and has also criticized the Government of Telangana regarding the negligence of several heritage structures and hospitals built by the 7th Nizam – Mir Osman Ali Khan. This has extended especially to the Osmania General Hospital (OGH), due to be demolished as it has become irreparable due to decades of negligence, and has been involved in other heritage, legal advocacy, social causes, political engagement issues and the preservation of the Nizam's legacy.

== Legal representation of Nizam family ==
He has represented many of the Nizam's descendants in legal cases including the "Hyderabad Funds Case", which concerns the £35 million (value in 2019) which used to belong to the last Nizam and is now in the NatWest Bank in England. The case was decided in London in favour of the Republic of India and the Nizam's descendants in October 2019, with the concurrent dismissal of Pakistan's claim.

== Opposition to demolition of Osmania General Hospital ==
Nawab Mir Najaf opposed the demolition of Osmania General Hospital (OGH), and had written several letters to the previous Governor E.S.L. Narasimhan to intervene and expedite the restoration of the hospital building in response to ongoing protests by the Telangana Junior Doctors’ Association. The issue incolved protests, lasting over 100 days, prompted government assurances to address the dilapidated heritage structure. Khan emphasized the hospital's critical role, serving over 1,000 patients daily from neighbouring regions like Maharashtra and Karnataka. Despite an INTACH report affirming the building's fitness, Khan highlighted neglected repairs, including leakages from toilets and water pipes. Since 2018, Khan has repeatedly stressed the urgency of preserving both the historic structure and the healthcare services it provides to a significant patient population.

== Social campaigns ==
=== COVID-19 ===
In 2020, during the height of COVID-19 pandemic, the Nawab appealed on social media to fellow Muslims in Hyderabad, to abstain from excessive shopping while emphasizing the need to prioritize the well-being of the underprivileged during these challenging times. He encouraged Muslims to focus on helping those in need by donating towards the daily expenses of the less fortunate.

== Politics ==
=== Joining the National Congress ===
In November 2023, he officially joined the Indian National Congress in the presence of All India Congress Committee (AICC) president Mallikarjun Kharge. Khan emphasized the longstanding association of his family, spanning almost four generations, with the Congress, noting that joining the party was a natural extension of the historical ties between the Nizam family and the Gandhi family. He, along with his family have previously met former President of the INC, Sonia Gandhi, current President of the INC, Rahul Gandhi, and general secretary of the AICC, Priyanka Gandhi, several times. Kharge highlighted the Nizam family's significant contributions to the nation, extending from Jawaharlal Nehru's time to Rahul Gandhi's.

== Relations with other Royals ==
=== The Wodeyars ===
Nawab Najaf Ali Khan met Yaduveer Krishnadatta Chamaraja Wadiyar, of the Wadiyar Dynasty, at the Mysore Palace, wherein Wadiyar highlighted the role of the Asaf Jahs in protecting interests of other maharajas against the British and during the 1962 India-China War. Prince Yaduveer also mentioned how Mir Osman Ali Khan had contributed 5,000 kg gold to support the country in the 1962 War and that the 7th Nizam supported the construction of a very important part of the Mysore Palace.

== Press conferences ==
=== Appreciating the Telangana State police ===
Nawab Najaf Ali Khan congratulated the Telangana State Police on behalf of the Nizam Family Welfare Association for recovering the items stolen from the Nizam's Museum within a week of the theft and nabbing the culprits. He stated:

"We cannot even put into words our joy and relief that the stolen items of our beloved Grandfather were recovered. But we are also left feeling bittersweet as our happiness is also mixed with feelings of disappointment at the management who are solely responsible for this incident,"

=== Complaint against Mukarram Jah ===
Nawab Najaf Ali Khan met the Police Commissioner and submitted a complaint along with supporting documents. He alleged in the complaint that another grandson of the Seventh Nizam, Prince Mukarram Jah alias Barkat Ali Khan, his ex-wife Esra Birgen Jah (also the GPA holder of Prince Mukarram Jah in certain), his son Azmet Jah (Titular Nizam Pretender) and his brother Prince Muffakham Jah had used false documents in the UK High Court to lay claim over the £35 million Nizam’s Fund lying in NatWest Bank there.
