= Manolya Onur =

Princess Manolya
- Her Exalted Highness Princess Manolya of Hyderabad and Berar
- Born: 1955; Turkey
- Died: 25 October 2017 (aged 61–62)
- Spouse: Mukarram Jah (1992–1997; divorced)
- Issue: Princess Niloufer
Names
- Manolya Onur

Manolya Onur, Princess Qhabl Begum Sahiba Manolya-i-Nur (1955 – 25 October 2017) was a Turkish model and beauty pageant titleholder who won Miss Turkey 1976 and represented her country at Miss Universe 1976. She became a princess of Berar by marriage.

== Career ==
She competed in the Miss Turkey pageant in 1976 and represented Turkey in the 1976 Miss Universe beauty pageant. Manolya had a career as a model from 1976 to 1978. She spent six years in France studying English, French, German as well as the History of Art at the Sorbonne University, France.

== Personal life ==
She was a granddaughter-in-law of Sultan Abdülmecid II, the last Ottoman Caliph by virtue of her marriage. She married Mukarram Jah in August 1992 at Çırağan Palace, Hyderabad and became a princess styled as H.E.H. Manolya-i-Nur Begum Sahiba. She lived in India and Australia during her marriage. Their daughter Nilufer (named after Princess Niloufer) was born in 1993. Nizam divorced Manolya in 1997 at Geneva, Switzerland. After her divorce, Manolya moved back to Turkey and since then she had been living in Istanbul and working for charitable institutions such as the Osteoporosis Patient Society. She died in 2017.
