= Esra Birgen =

Hyderabadi Noble (born 1936)

Princess Esra Birgin
- Born: Esra Birgen; 1936 (age 89–90); Turkey
- Spouse: Mukarram Jah, Crown Prince of Hyderabad (1959–1974; divorced)
- Issue: Azmet Jah, Crown Prince of Hyderabad; Princess Shehryar

Princess Esra Birgen (born Esra Birgen; 1936) is a Hyderabadi Noble from Turkey, who was once married to Crown Prince Mukarram Jah, the Head of the House of Asaf Jah of the Kingdom of Hyderabad.

== Personal life ==
Princess Esra married Prince Mukarram Jah in 1959. They were married for 15 years. They have a son Azmet (born 1962) and a daughter Shekhya (born 1964). She lives in London.

Princess Esra hospital was established by her in the year 1972 to provide subsidized medical facilities for the people of old city Hyderabad.

This hospital was recently acquired on lease by Owaisi group of hospitals.

== Palace restoration ==
Princess Esra is credited with the restoration of Chowmahalla Palace and Falaknuma Palace. The former was opened to the public while the latter was leased as a luxury hotel to the Taj Group.

She appointed architect Rahul Mehrotra to restore the Chowmahalla Palace.

She initiated a project for the royal palaces in August 2000. The restoration project for Chowmahalla Palace involved tasks ranging from stabilising the existing structural components to reconstitution of collapsed and dilapidated sections of the complex, restoration of external and internal spaces and decorative elements and finishes.

== Donation to Yadadri temple ==
On behalf of the Nizam Family, she donated a gold chain worth Rs 6 lakh to the Sri Lakshmi Narasimha Swamy Temple, Yadadri. The gold necklace was handed over to the temple Executive Officer Geetha by Yadagirigutta Temple Development Authority (YTDA) vice-chairman Kishan Rao.
