= Falaknuma Palace =

Palace in Hyderabad, India

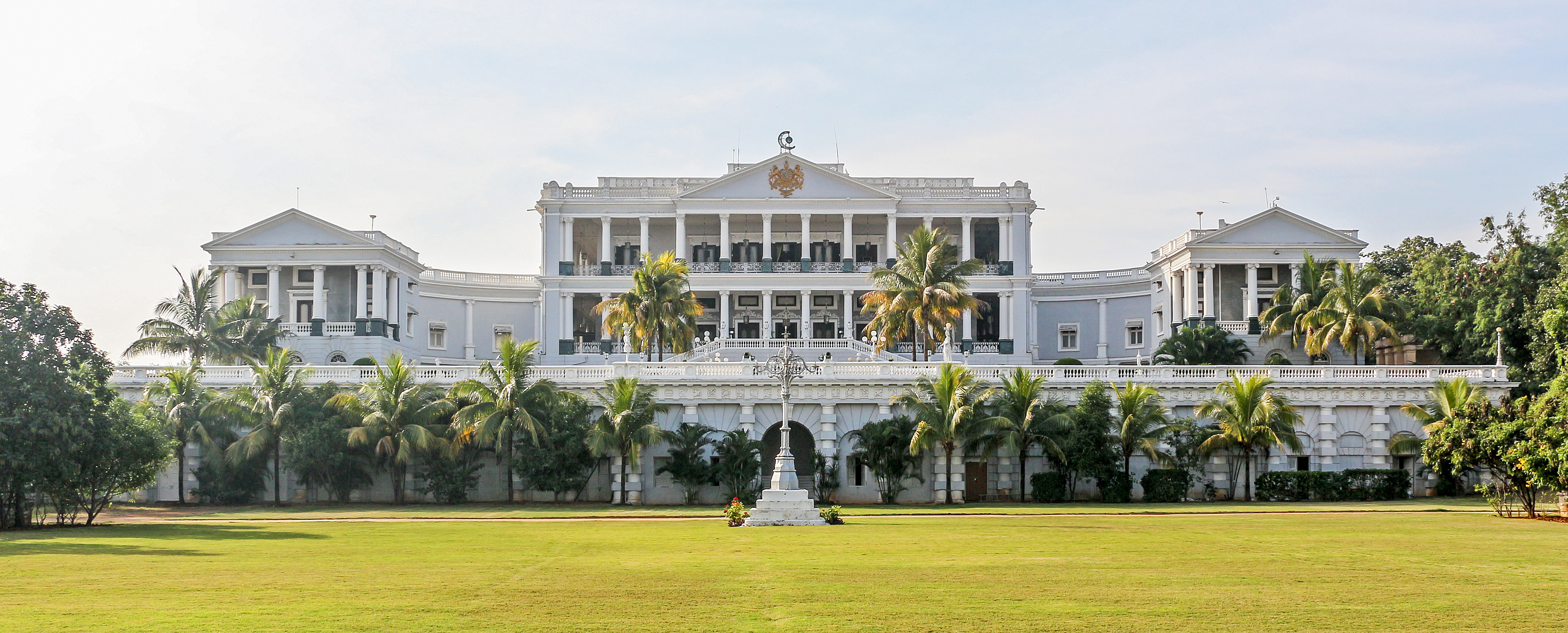
- Falaknuma Palace northern view

- Location within Hyderabad

General information
- Status: Adapted to a luxury hotel
- Location: Hyderabad, India
- Coordinates: 17.3305°N 78.4675°E
- Construction started: 3 March 1884
- Completed: 1893; 133 years ago
- Opening: 1 Nov 2010 (as a hotel); 1893 (as a palace)
- Cost: ₹4 million
- Owner: Azmet Jah
- Operator: Taj Hotels Resorts and Palaces

Design and construction
- Architect: William Ward Marrett

Falaknuma Palace is a palace and a luxury hotel in Hyderabad, Telangana, India. It originally belonged to the Paigah family, and was later owned by the Nizam of Hyderabad. It is on a hillock and covers a 13-hectare (32-acre) area in Falaknuma, 5 kilometres (3.1 mi) from Charminar.

Built by Nawab Sir Viqar-ul-Umra, Prime Minister of Hyderabad state and the uncle and brother-in-law of the sixth Nizam. Falak-numa means "Like the Sky" or "Mirror of Sky" in Urdu. At the time of its completion in 1893, it was the tallest building in Hyderabad.

The palace post renovation carried out in 2010 today is a part of Taj Group and has been renamed as Taj Faluknama Palace.

== Design ==
An English architect William Ward Marret designed the palace. It is made completely with Italian marble with stained-glass windows.

The palace was built in the shape of a scorpion with two stings spread out as wings in the north. The middle part is occupied by the main building and the kitchen, Gol Bangla, Zenana Mehal, and harem quarters stretch to the south. The Nawab was an avid traveller, and this reflects in the architecture, which combines Italian and Tudor influences.

The Palace has a library with a carved walnut roof, a replica of the one at Windsor Castle. The library had one of the finest collection of the Quran in India. The ground floor of the Palace housed the living quarters. A marble staircase leads to the upper floor. It has carved balustrades, which support marble figurines with candelabra at intervals.

One of the highlights of the Palace is the State Reception Room, where the ceiling is decorated with frescoes and gilded reliefs. The Ballroom contains a 2-ton manually operated organ, said to be the only one of its kind in the world. The palace has 60 lavishly decorated rooms and 22 spacious halls. It has some of the finest collections of the Nizam’s treasures, including paintings, statues, furniture, manuscripts and books. The jade collection at the Palace is considered to be unique in the world.

== History ==
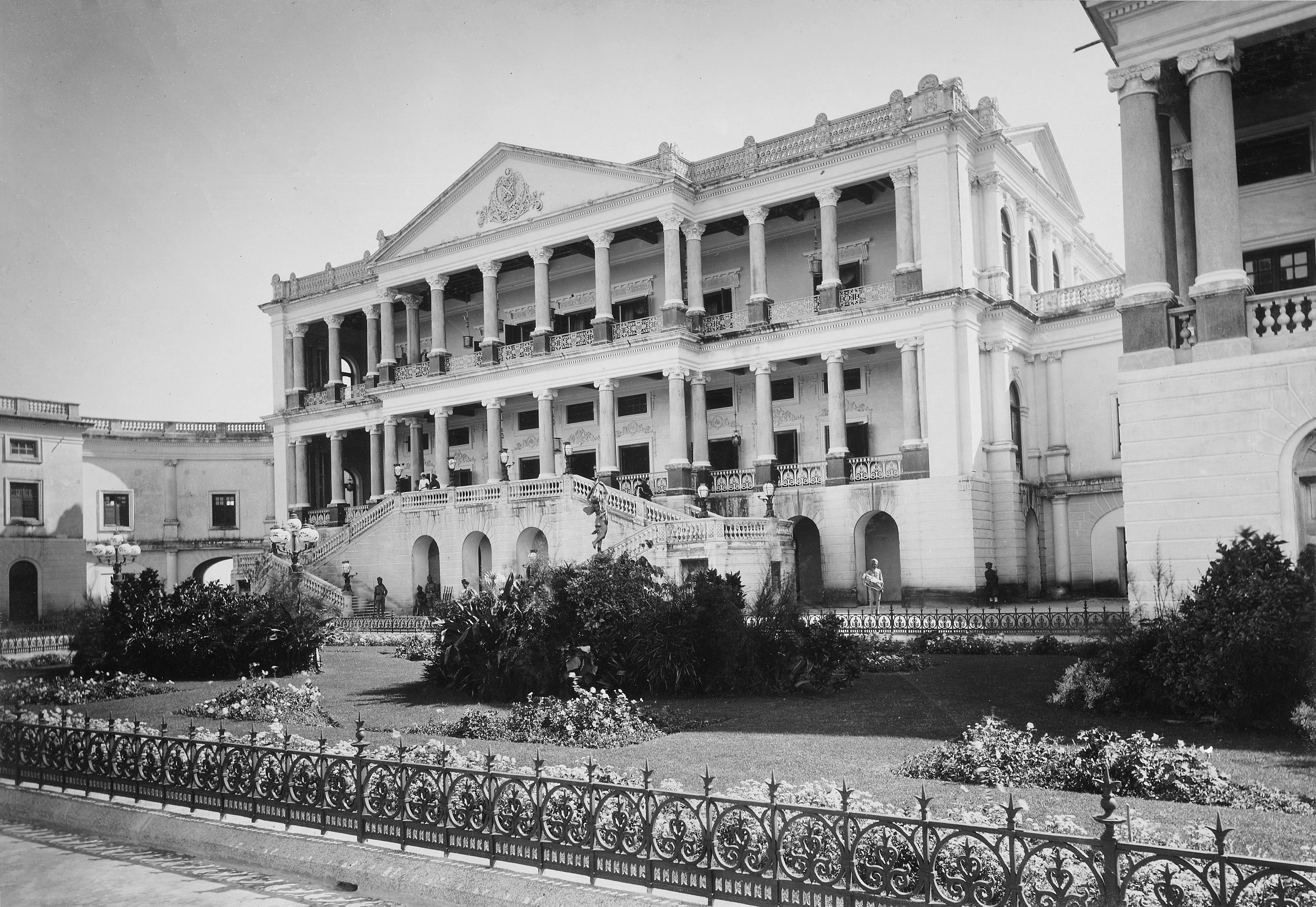
Falaknuma Palace, photographed by Lala Deen Dayal in 1900.

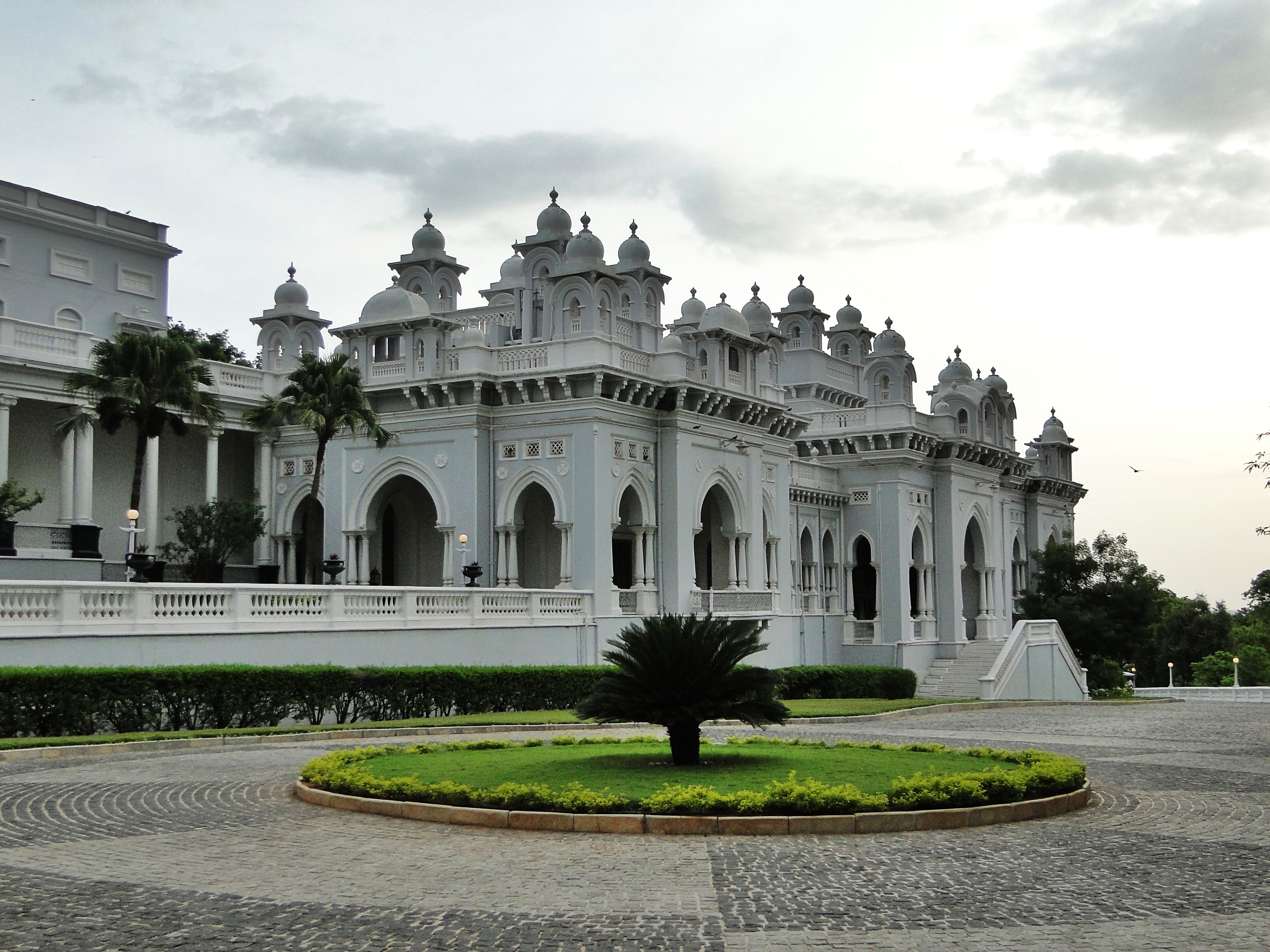
The entrance to the Palace

Sir Viqar-ul-Umra, the Prime Minister of Hyderabad, after a visit to Europe, decided to build a European styled residence for himself. The foundation stone for the construction was laid by Sir Vicar on 3 March 1884. It took nine years to complete the construction and furnish the palace. Sir Vicar moved into the Gol Bangla and Zanana Mahel of the Falaknuma Palace in December 1890 and closely monitored the finishing work at the Mardana portion.

He used the palace as his private residence until the palace was handed over to the 6th Nizam of Hyderabad around 1897–1898.

The palace was built and furnished at a cost of ₹4 million (equivalent to ₹2.0 billion or US$21 million in 2026), which necessitated borrowing money from the Bank of Bengal. In the spring of 1897, the sixth Nizam of Hyderabad, Mir Mahbub Ali Khan was invited to stay at the palace. He extended his stay to a week, then a fortnight, and then a month, which prompted Sir Viqar to offer it to him. The Nizam accepted but paid some of the value of the palace.

The Nizam used the palace as a guest house for the royal guests visiting the kingdom of Hyderabad. The list of royal visitors included King George V, Queen Mary, Edward VIII and Tsar Nicholas II. The palace fell into disuse after the 1950s. The last important guest was the President of India, Rajendra Prasad, in 1951.

The palace was then restored after being leased by the Taj Group of Hotels. The restoration, which began in 2000, took ten years, and was managed by Princess Esra, the first wife of Mukarram Jah. Now, the hotel is again used to host guests in Hyderabad, such as Aga Khan IV, Ivanka Trump and Narendra Modi.

== Palace architecture ==
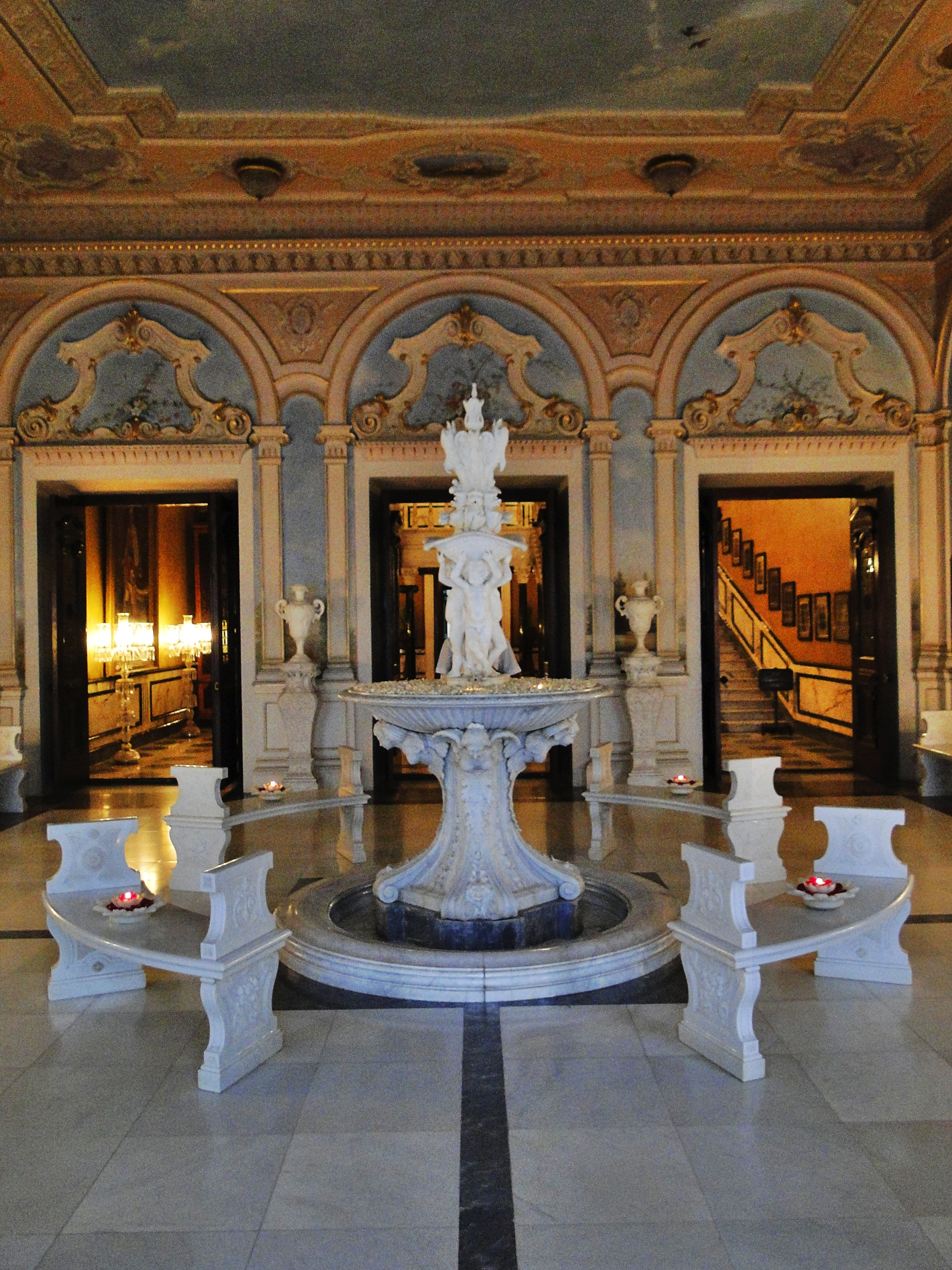
The reception room of the Palace.

One of the highlights of the palace is the state reception room, where the ceiling is decorated with frescoes. The ballroom contains a two-ton manually operated organ said to be the only one of its kind in the world The palace has 60 rooms and 22 halls. It has considerable collections of the Nizam's artifacts including paintings, statues, furniture, manuscripts, books, an extensive jade collection, and the largest collection of Venetian chandeliers, with 40 138-arm Osler chandeliers in the halls.

The dining hall can seat 101 guests. The chairs are made of carved rosewood with green leather upholstery.

It has a library with a carved walnut roof, a replica of the one at Windsor Castle. The library houses more than five thousand books. It has an extensive collection of English, Urdu and Persian books as well as copies of the Quran, and rare first editions.

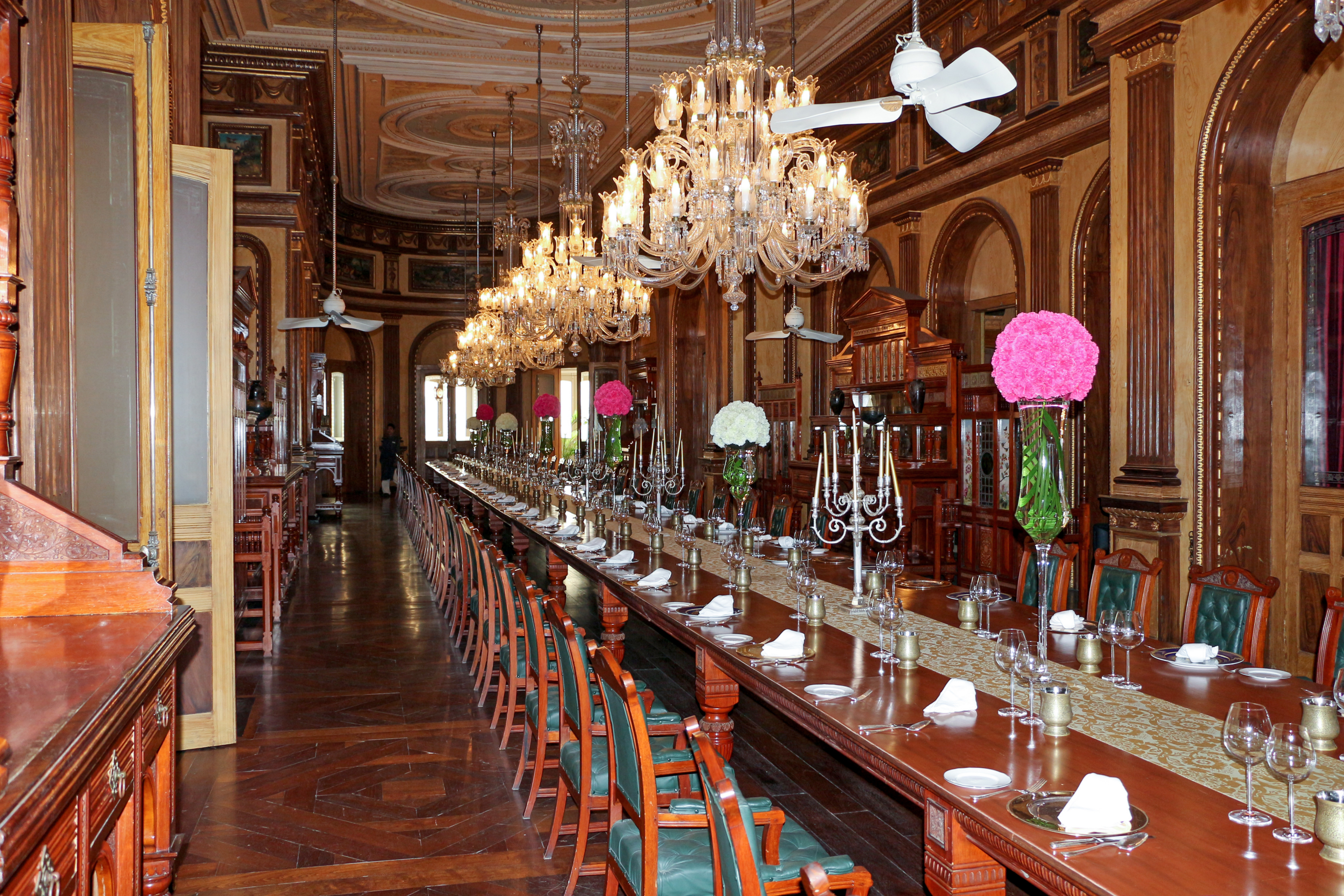
The dining hall

Burroughs and Watts from England designed two identical billiards tables, one of which is in Buckingham Palace and the other in the palace's billiards room.

The palace was the private property of the Nizam family, and not normally open to the public, until 2000.

== Renovation into a luxury hotel ==
In 2000, Taj Hotels started renovating and restoring the palace. The renovated hotel was opened in November 2010.

== In popular culture ==
- Scenes of films like Radhe Shyam, K.G.F: Chapter 2 and Sikandar were shot inside Falaknuma Palace.
