= Murchison House Station =

Pastoral lease in Western Australia

Coordinates: 27.6454°S 114.237°E

Location in Western Australia

Murchison House Station is a pastoral lease that once operated as a sheep station but now rears cattle and goats in Western Australia.

== Description ==
It is located approximately 12 kilometres (7 mi) east of Kalbarri and 650 kilometres (404 mi) north of Perth in the Mid West region of Western Australia. It occupies an area of 140,000 hectares (350,000 acres) and has a 60-kilometre (37 mi) frontage along the Indian Ocean and a 30-kilometre (19 mi) frontage along the Murchison River. The property is mostly situated on the ancient limestone Toolonga escarpment, which was formed some 150 million years ago as a coral reef. The reef has lithified and now rises to around 180 metres (590 ft) above sea level and forms the rugged terrain down the middle of the station. The landscape also includes the Murchison River flood plains and coastal dunes. The varied soil types is mostly red or black loam over limestone or sandy soils over limestone in a coastal heathland community. Pastures are composed of a mix of native and introduced grasses, mulga and wattle scrub.

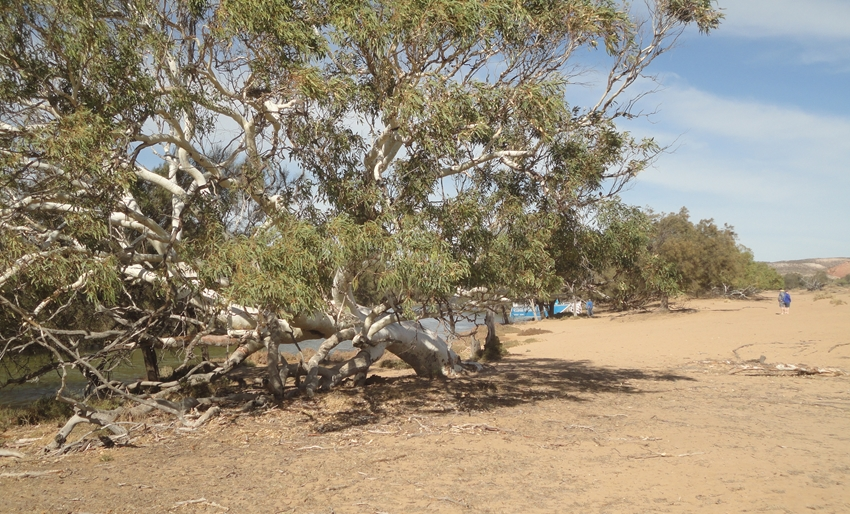
Murchison House Station along Murchison River

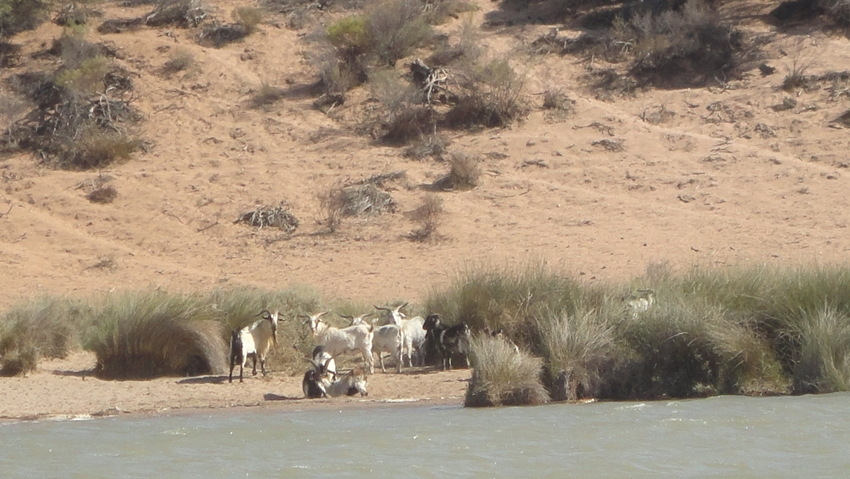
Goats at Murchison House Station

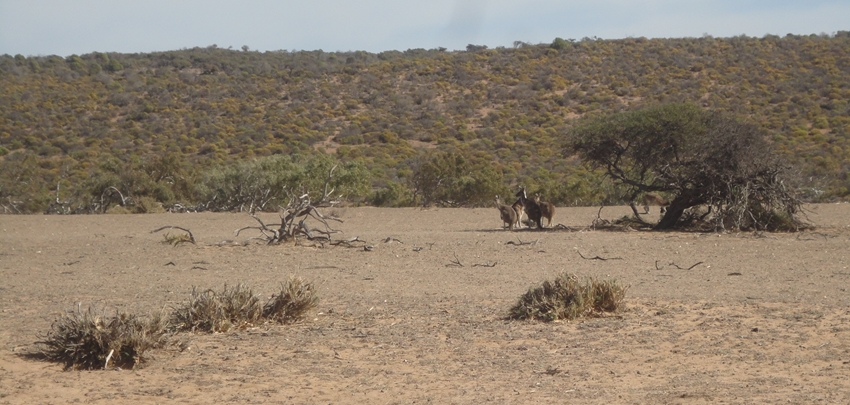
Kangaroos on Murchison House Station

== History ==
The property was established in 1858 by Charles von Bibra, who produced meat and wheat for the nearby lead mines at Galena and bred Arab horses on the lease. The original homestead was also constructed in 1858 from Tumblagouda sandstone and mud bricks using convict labour. The shearing shed was built in 1860 also using local materials and convict labour. Von Bibra let the property to Charles Gill in 1869 then travelled to Tasmania. Andrew James Ogilvie acquired the property sometime prior to 1895 and it was put up for auction following his death in 1906. In 1907 the property occupied an area of 99,423 hectares (245,680 acres) and had a 14-room homestead, stables, staff quarters and storeroom when it was purchased by Thomas Amos Drage and his brother, William John Drage. The Drages paid £18,250, equivalent to A$3.08 million in 2022, for the station, including all of the stock, stores and household furniture.

Western Australia's first civil aviation fatality occurred near the property in 1921 when two people died in a Bristol Tourer crash. An inquest into the crash was held at the station.

In 1934 the property was stocked with about 20,000 sheep and 150 horses.

An Indian prince, Mukarram Jah, the 8th Nizam of Hyderabad, acquired the property in 1972. However, his properties and business interests in India declined and/or were misappropriated in his absence, leading to Murchison House being placed in liquidation in 1996. Jah left Australia and took up residence in Turkey shortly afterwards.

The shearing shed was refurbished in the 1990s after it had fallen into a state of disrepair. The shed is now used for tourist accommodation.

The homestead was flooded in 2006 to a depth of over 1 metre (3 ft 3 in) when the Murchison River flooded; volunteers sandbagged covered the outer walls with plastic to waterproof it.

In 2017 the property was owned by Calum and Belinda Carruth. A small cache of guns was found in a cave on the property by a group of school children playing on a rock formation who came across a metal box containing a 100-year-old Browning machine gun and a 30-year-old Boito shotgun.

The 141,600-hectare (350,000-acre) property was stocked with 200 shorthorn cross cattle and around 7,000 rangeland goats in 2018.

== See also ==
- List of ranches and stations
- List of pastoral leases in Western Australia
