= Asaf Jahi dynasty =

Muslim dynasty that ruled the Hyderabad State of India from 1734 to 1948

House of Asaf Jah
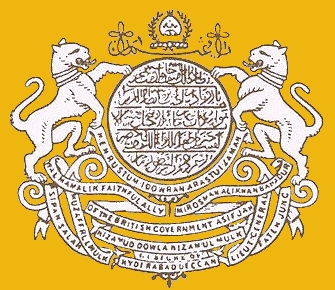
- Coat of Arms of the Nizam of Hyderabad
- Parent family: Banu Taym
- Founded: 31 July 1724
- Founder: Asaf Jah I
- Current head: Azmet Jah
- Final ruler: Osman Ali Khan
- Titles: Nizam-ul-Mulk; Nawab
- Style: His Exalted Highness
- Traditions: Sunni Islam
- Estate: Chowmahalla Palace
- Deposition: 17 September 1948

The Asaf Jahi is a Muslim dynasty that ruled the Hyderabad State. The family came to India in the late 17th century and became employees of the Mughal Empire. They were great patrons of Indo-Persian culture, language, and literature, and the family found ready patronage.

The dynasty was founded by Mir Qamar-ud-Din Siddiqi, a Viceroy of the Deccan—(administrator of six Mughal governorates) under the Mughal emperors from 1713 to 1721. He intermittently ruled after Aurangzeb's death in 1707 and under the title Asaf Jah in 1724. The Mughal Empire crumbled and the Viceroy of the Deccan, Asaf Jah I, declared himself independent, whose domain extended from the Narmada River in the North to Trichinopoly in the South and Masulipatnam in the east to Bijapur in the west.

== History ==
Nawab Khwaja Abid Siddiqi, the grandfather of the first Nizam, was born in Aliabad near Samarkand in the kingdom of Bukhara in modern-day Uzbekistan. His father, Alam Shaik, was a well-known Sufi and celebrated man of letters. Khwaja Abid's mother was from the family of Mir Hamdan, a distinguished Syed of Samarkhand. The first Nizam's mother was the daughter of Sadullah Khan, the Grand vizier (1645-1656) of Mughal Emperor Shah Jahan.

After succeeding in the war of succession, Aurangzeb made him the Governor of Ajmer and subsequently of Multan with the title of Qalich Khan. He served the Emperor with distinction particularly during the early years of Aurangzeb's reign while he was consolidating and restoring peace in his newly acquired territory.

Asaf Jah's father Ghazi ud-Din Khan Feroze Jung I was a military general under Aurangzeb. Under the command of Feroze Jung, Hyderabad was sieged and later occupied by the Mughals.

== Asaf Jah I ==
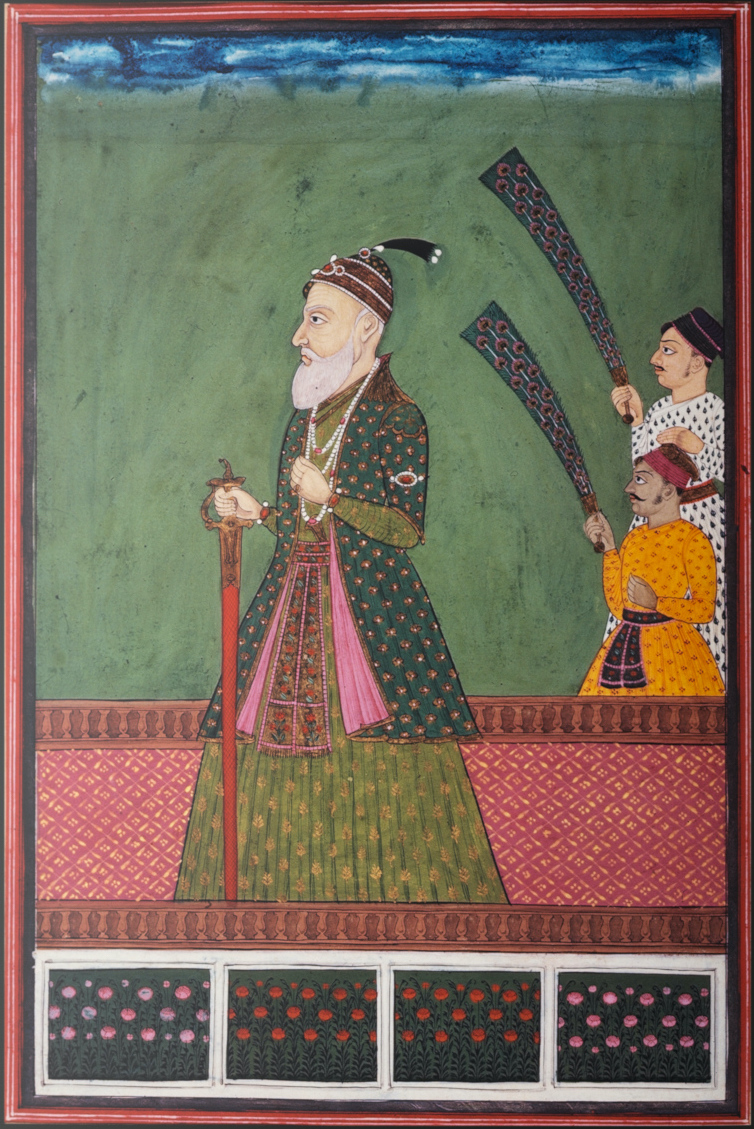
Qamaruddin Khan, Asaf Jah I

The founder of this dynasty was Mir Qamaruddin Khan, a noble and a courtier of the Mughal Muhammad Shah, who negotiated a peace treaty with Nader Shah got disgusted with the intrigues that prevailed in Delhi. He was on his way back to the Deccan, where, earlier he was a Subedar. But he had to confront Mubariz Khan, as a result of a plot by the Mughal emperor to kill the former. Mubariz Khan failed in his attempt and he was himself slain. This one took place in AD 1724, and henceforth Mir Qamaruddin, who assumed the title of Nizam-ul-Mulk, conducted himself as an independent ruler. Earlier, while he was one of the Ministers of the Mughal emperor Muhammad Shah, the latter conferred on him the title of Asaf Jah. Thus begins the Asaf Jahi rule over Golconda with the capital at Aurangabad.

== Asaf Jah II ==
The fourth son of the Nizam-ul-Mulk, Nizam Ali Khan was born on 24 February 1734. He assumed the Subedari of the Deccan at the age of 28 years and ruled the Deccan for almost 42 years - the longest period among the Nizams. His reign was one of the most important chapters in the history of the Asaf Jahi dynasty. Among his efforts to consolidate the Nizam empire was the shift of the Deccan capital from Aurangabad to Hyderabad. He ruled the Deccan at a most critical period and got very successful support from the House of Paigah. He protected the Deccan from the attack of the Marathas and Tippu Sultan of Mysore by signing a mutual protection treaty with the British.

After a reign that played a pivotal role in the establishment of the Nizam dynasty, Nizam Ali Khan Siddiqi died in 1803 at the age of 69. He was buried at the Mecca Masjid alongside the tomb of his mother Umda Begum.

== Asaf Jah III ==
Mir Akbar Ali Khan Siddiqi Sikander Jah, Asaf Jah III was born on 11 November 1768. After the death of Nizam Ali Khan, he became the Subedar Jah was ratified by the emperor Shah Alam II and also conferred all his father's titles on Sikander Jah.

== Asaf Jah IV ==
Mir Farkhunda Ali Khan Siddiqi Nusir-ud-Dawlah was born in Bidar on 25 April 1794. He was the eldest son of Sikander Jah and after his father's death, he succeeded him on 23 May 1829.

== Asaf Jah V ==
Mir Tahniath Ali Khan Siddiqi Afzal-ud-daula was born in Kuruduwadi on 11 October 1827. He was the eldest son of Nawab Nasir-ud-daula. He ascended the throne on 18 May 1857 and the Indian mutiny was started on 17 July 1857 Rohillas attacked the residency but Sir Salar Jung put down the attack with a firm hand. Similarly, trouble started in Solapur but the Maharaja of Solapur was unable to control it.

He also purchased the Nizam's Rubath, an accommodation building for pilgrims from Hyderabad State travelling to Mecca during their pilgrimage.

== Asaf Jah VI ==
Mir Mahboob Ali Khan was born in Tandur on 17 August 1866. He was the only son of Nawab Afzal-ud-Daula Asaf Jah V. When his father died he was two years and seven months old. He was installed as the Munsab by Sir Salar Jung I, Nawab Rasheeduddin Khan, Shams ul Ummra and the residents, there functioned as the Reyab. Shar-ul-Ummul died on 12 December 1881 and Salar Jung became the sole regent. He was remembered as administrator and regent till his death. after the death of Sir Salar Jung I Sir Viqar-ul-Umra became the next Regent and guardian of Mahboob Ali Khan and served as Prime Minister of Hyderabad.

He is popularly known for his efforts to abolish the practice of Sati and for having supernatural healing powers against Snakebite.

== Asaf Jah VII ==
Asaf Jah VII was the last Nizam (ruler) of Hyderabad State.He signed the instrument of accession, joining India in 1948. Mir Osman Ali Khan was born in Hyderabad on 5 April 1886 at Purani Haveli. Since he was the heir-apparent, great attention was paid to his education, and eminent scholars were engaged to teach him English, Urdu, Persian. On 14 April 1906, he married Dulhan Pasha Begum, daughter of Nawab Jahangir Jung, at Eden Bagh, at the age of 21.

He is credited for various reforms in education and development and remembered for being a truly secular King by giving yearly donations to various temples. He made large donations to educational institutions in India and abroad. He donated Rs 10 Lakh to the Banaras Hindu University and Rs 5 Lakh to the Aligarh Muslim University.

He set up the Osmania University, Osmania General Hospital, Osmania Medical College, State Bank of Hyderabad, South India's first airport -the Begumpet Airport, Nizamia Observatory, Government Nizamia General Hospital, etc.

The Nizam was reported to have fathered 34 children including 16 sons and 18 daughters.

== Others ==
=== Descendants of Asaf Jah VII ===
- Azam Jah, Prince of Berar, GCIE, GBE, MSM (21 February 1907 – 9 October 1970). Granted the title of His Highness the Prince of Berar (13 November 1936). Passed over in the line of succession in 1967 in favour of his elder son. He had two sons, the elder Mukarram Jah and the younger Muffakham Jah
- Moazzam Jah, second son of Asaf Jah VII.
- Barkat Ali Khan Mukarram Jah, Asaf Jah VIII, 8th (Titular) Nizam of Hyderabad (6 October 1933 - 14 January 2023). Succeeded his grandfather as a titular monarch on 24 January 1967; titles were abolished by the Indian Government on 28 December 1971. He had children including two sons.
- Muhammad Azmat Ali Khan, Asaf Jah IX, 9th (Titular) Nizam of Hyderabad (23 July 1960 - ). Succeeded his father as titular monarch on 14 January 2023; titles were abolished by the Indian Government on 28 December 1971. He has a son, Murad Jah.
- Najaf Ali Khan - Grandson of 7th Nizam - known for being a Hyderabad Heritage enthusiast, who has also criticized the Government of Telangana regarding the negligence of several heritage structures and hospitals built by the 7th Nizam.

== Asaf Jahi rulers of Hyderabad ==
Image	Titular Name	Personal Name	Date of birth	Nizam From	Nizam Until	Date of death
	Nizam-ul-Mulk, Asaf Jah I نظام‌الملک آصف جاہ	Mir Qamar-ud-din Khan	20 August 1671	31 July 1724	1 June 1748	
	Nasir Jung نصیرجنگ	Mir Ahmed Ali Khan	26 February 1712	1 June 1748	16 December 1750	
	Muzaffar Jung مظفرجنگ	Mir Hidayat Muhi-ud-din Sa'adullah Khan	?	16 December 1750	13 February 1751	
	Salabat Jung صلابت جنگ	Mir Sa'id Muhammad Khan	24 November 1718	13 February 1751	8 July 1762 (deposed)	16 September 1763
	Nizam-ul-Mulk, Asaf Jah II نظام‌الملک آصف جاہ دوم	Mir Nizam Ali Khan	7 March 1734	8 July 1762	6 August 1803	
	Sikander Jah, Asaf Jah III سکندر جاہ ،آصف جاہ سوئم	Mir Akbar Ali Khan	11 November 1768	6 August 1803	21 May 1829	
	Nasir-ud-Daula, Asaf Jah IV ناصر الدولہ ،آصف جاہ چہارم	Mir Farqunda Ali Khan	25 April 1794	21 May 1829	16 May 1857	
	Afzal-ud-Daula, Asaf Jah V افضال الدولہ ،آصف جاہ پنجم	Mir Tahniyath Ali Khan	11 October 1827	16 May 1857	26 February 1869	
	Asaf Jah VI آصف جاہ شیشم	Mir Mahbub Ali Khan میر محبوب علی خان	17 August 1866	26 February 1869	29 August 1911	
	Asaf Jah VII آصف جاہ ہفتم	Mir Osman Ali Khan میر عثمان علی خان	6 April 1886	29 August 1911	17 September 1948 (deposed)	24 February 1967

Nasir Jung, Muzaffar Jung and Salabat Jung:- * These three rulers are not enumerated in the order of the Asaf Jah's, mainly because they were not granted the title of ASAF JAH by the Mughal Emperor.

=== Titular ===
Titular Name	Personal Name	Date of birth	Nizam From	Nizam Until	Date of Death	Note(s)
Asaf Jah VIII آصف جاہ ہشتم	Mir Barkat Ali Khan میر برکت علی خان	6 October 1933	24 February 1967	5 November 1971 (deposed)	15 January 2023	Government of India recognised him in 1964 as heir-apparent to Asaf Jah VII, and following his grandfather's demise in 1967, he succeeded to his rank, dignity, and title. His coronation took place at Chowmahalla Palace on April 6, 1967, and he was recognised as Ruler of Hyderabad on April 14, 1964, by the Government of India. However, due to 26th Amendment to the Constitution of India, he ceased to enjoy his princely pensions, titles, and privileges.
Asaf Jah IX آصف جاہ نہم	Mir Muhammad Azmet Ali Khan میر محمد عظمت علی خان	23 July 1960	20 January 2023			Azmet Jah acceded to the throne of the former Hyderabad State on 14 January 2023, following the death of Asaf Jah VIII. Azmat Jah's ceremonial coronation took place on 20 January 2023, at Chowmahalla Palace.

== Family tree ==
Genealogy of the Asaf Jahi dynasty

Murrah ibn Ka'b
Taym ibn Murrah	Kilab ibn Murrah
Sa'd ibn Taym	Qusayy ibn Kilab
Ka'b ibn Sa'd	Abd Manaf ibn Qusayy
Amr ibn Ka'b	Hashim ibn Abd Manaf
Amir ibn Amr	Abd al-Muttalib ibn Hashim
Uthman ibn Amir	Abdullah ibn Abd al-Muttalib
Abu Bakr al-Siddiq	Prophet; Muhammad
20 generations
Shihab ud-Din; Umar al-Suhrawardi
14 generations
Abdul Rahman; Azizzan; Khan; Siddiqi; Bayafandi
Allahdad; Khan; Siddiqi; Bayafandi
Khawaja; Isma'il Khan; Siddiqi; Bayafandi	?
Kilich Khan	Sa'adullah; Khan
Ghazi ud-Din; Khan; Firuz Jung I	Safia Khanum
Nizam ul-Mulk; Asaf Jah I^{(1)} r. 1724-1748
Nasir Jung^{(2)} r. 1748-1750	Salabat Jung^{(4)} r. 1751-1762	Nizam ul-Mulk; Asaf Jah II^{(5)} r. 1762-1803	Khair un-Nisa; Begum
Sikandar Jah; Asaf Jah III^{(6)} r. 1803-1829	Muzaffar Jung^{(3)} r. 1750-1751
Nasir ud-Daulah; Asaf Jah IV^{(7)} r. 1829-1857
Afzal ud-Daulah; Asaf Jah V^{(8)} r. 1857-1869	Salar Jung I
Asaf Jah VI^{(9)} r. 1869-1911	Amat uz-Zahra
Asaf Jah VII^{(10)} r. 1911-1948 – Titular – 1948-1967	Abdul Majid II
Azam Jah; Prince of Berar	Durru Shehvar; Sultan
Asaf Jah VIII^{(11)} – Titular – 1967-1971; Head of House; 1971-2023
Asaf Jah IX^{(12)} Head of House; 2023-present

== See also ==
- Hyderabad State
- Nizam of Hyderabad
- National Anthem of Kingdom of Hyderabad
- House of Paigah
- Salar Jung family
- List of Sunni Muslim dynasties
- Karrani Dynasty

== Sources ==
- Chandra, Bipan; Mukherjee, Aditya; Mukherjee, Mridula (2008) [first published 1999], India Since Independence, Penguin Books India, ISBN 978-0-14-310409-4
- Advanced Study in the History of Modern India 1707–1813, p. 142, at Google Books books.google.com
