= Makkah Masjid, Hyderabad =

Mosque in Hyderabad, Telangana, India

Makkah Masjid
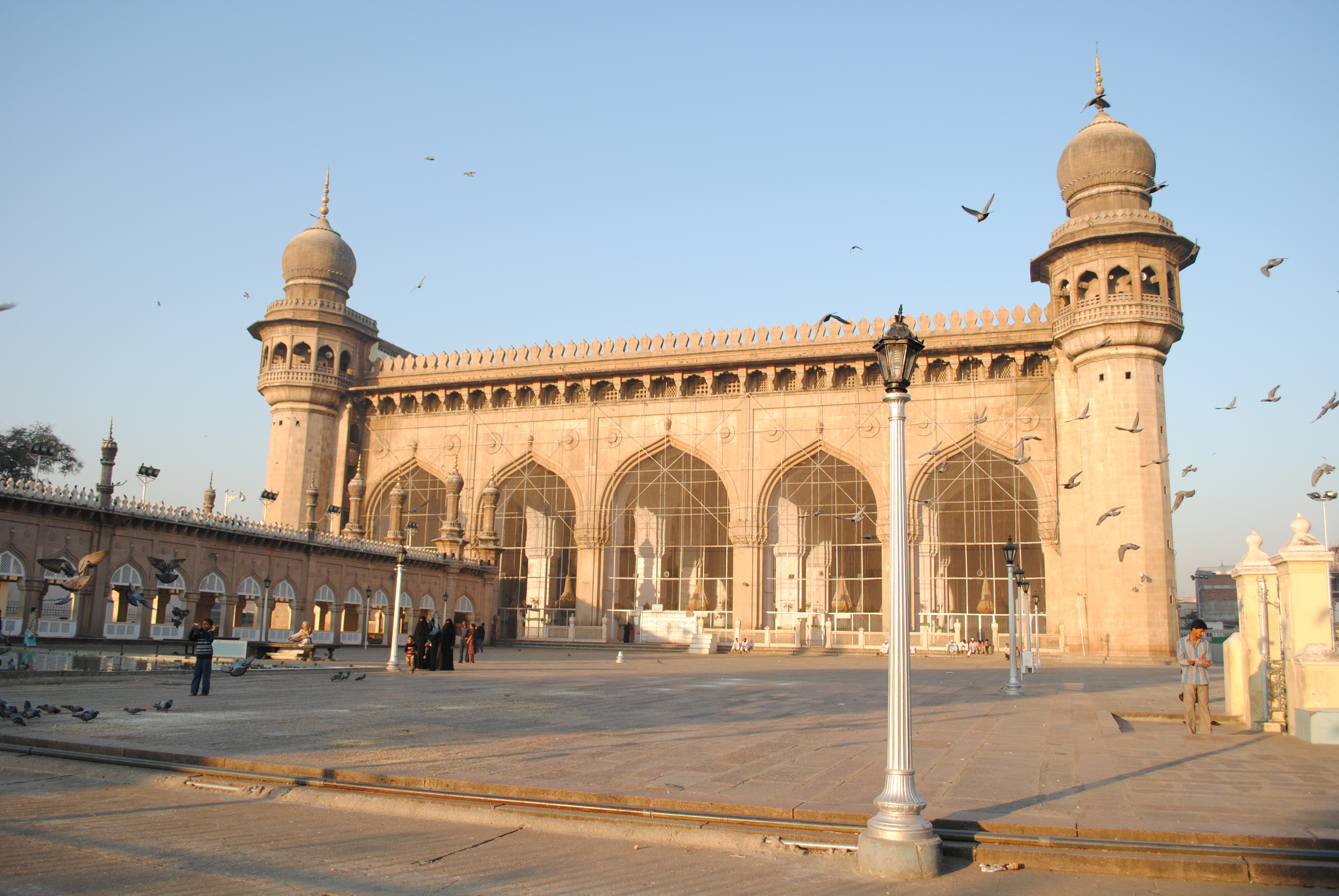
- The mosque on 25 December 2011

- Location of the mosque in Hyderabad

Religion
- Affiliation: Islam
- Ecclesiastical or organizational status: Friday mosque
- Status: Active

Location
- Location: Hyderabad, Hyderabad District, Telangana
- Country: India
- Interactive map of Makkah Masjid
- Administration: Telangana Department of Heritage
- Coordinates: 17°21′38″N 78°28′24″E

Architecture
- Type: Mosque architecture
- Style: Indo-Islamic; Qutb Shahi
- Founder: Muhammad Qutb Shah; Aurangzeb
- Groundbreaking: 1617 CE
- Completed: 1694 CE

Specifications
- Capacity: 10,000 worshippers
- Length: 67 m (220 ft)
- Width: 54 m (177 ft)
- Height (max): 23 m (75 ft)
- Minaret: Six (maybe more)
- Site area: 6.2 ha (15.2 acres)
- Materials: Granite; bricks

Mecca Masjid, also called Makkah Masjid, is a mosque located in Hyderabad in the state of Telangana, India. It is the largest mosque in the city, and one of the largest in the country, with a capacity of 10,000 worshippers. The mosque was built during the 17th century, and is a state-protected monument. It was completed by Mughal Emperor Aurangzeb in 1694 CE. It serves as the primary mosque for the Old City of Hyderabad, and is located close to the historic landmarks of Charminar, Chowmahalla Palace and Laad Bazaar.

Muhammad Qutb Shah, the sixth ruler of the Qutb Shahi dynasty, commissioned bricks to be made from the soil brought from Mecca, the holiest site of Islam, and used them in the construction of the central arch of the mosque, thus giving the mosque its name.

In 2014, UNESCO placed the complex on its "tentative list" to become a World Heritage Site, with others in the region, under the name Monuments and Forts of the Deccan Sultanate (despite there being a number of different sultanates).

== History ==
The construction of Makkah Masjid began in the year 1617 CE, during the reign of Sultan Muhammad Qutb Shah, the sixth Qutb Shahi Sultan of Golconda (now Hyderabad). The ruler personally laid its foundation stone. Around 8,000 workers were employed to build the mosque. It was completed by Mughal Emperor Aurangzeb in 1694 CE. The three-arched façades have been carved from a single piece of granite, which took five years to quarry.

Jean-Baptiste Tavernier, a French explorer, in his travelogue observed:

It is about 50 years since they began to build a splendid pagoda in the town which will be the grandest in all India when it is completed. The size of the stone is the subject of special accomplishment, and that of a niche, which is its place for prayer, is an entire rock of such enormous size that they spent five years in quarrying it, and 500 to 600 men were employed continually on its work. It required still more time to roll it up on to conveyance by which they brought it to the pagoda; and they took 1400 oxen to draw it.

=== Bombing ===
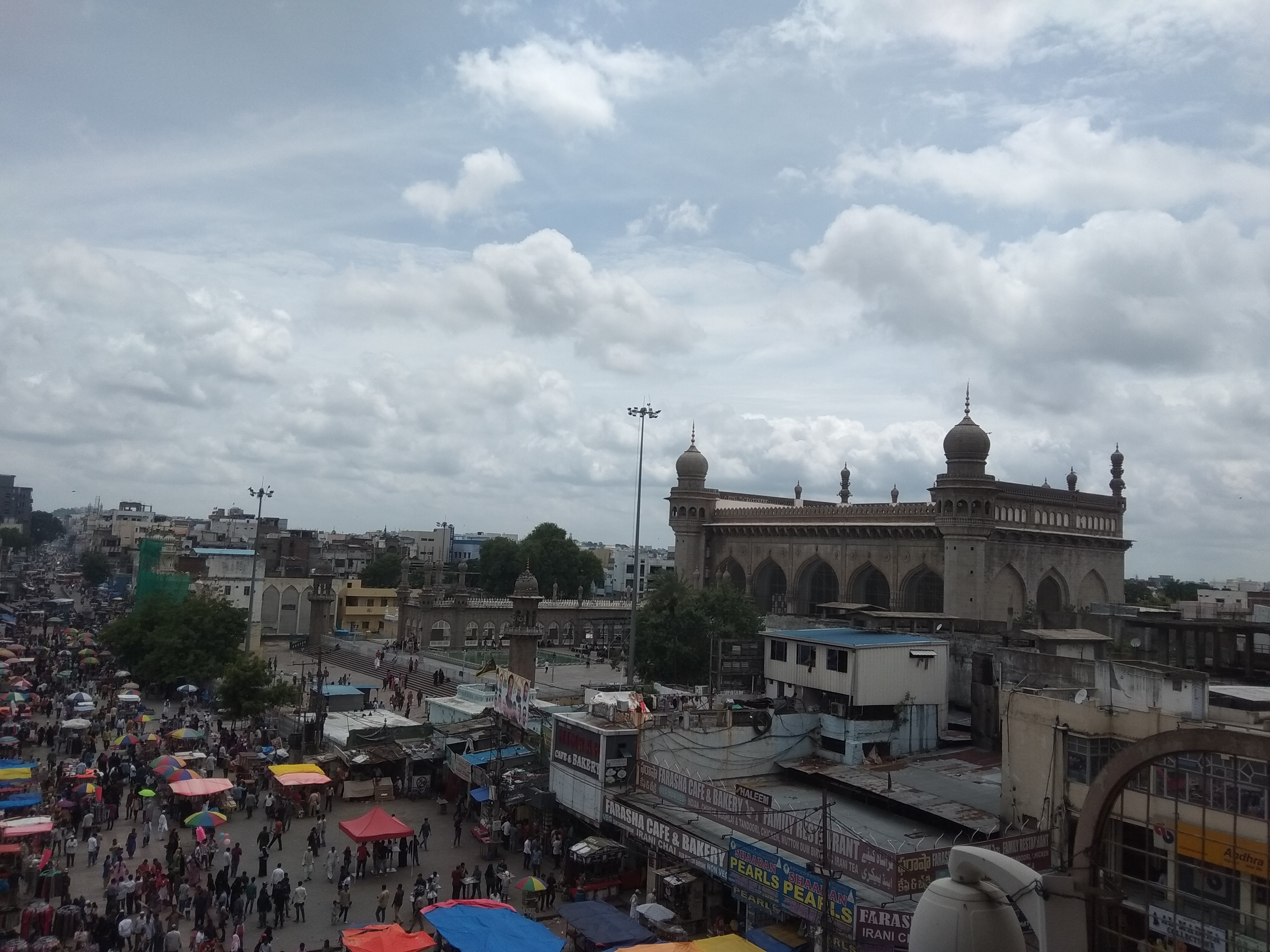
Makkah Masjid view from Charminar

On 18 May 2007, a bomb exploded inside the Makkah Masjid during Friday prayers, killing at least sixteen people and injuring dozens more. Police also defused two homemade bombs near the mosque.

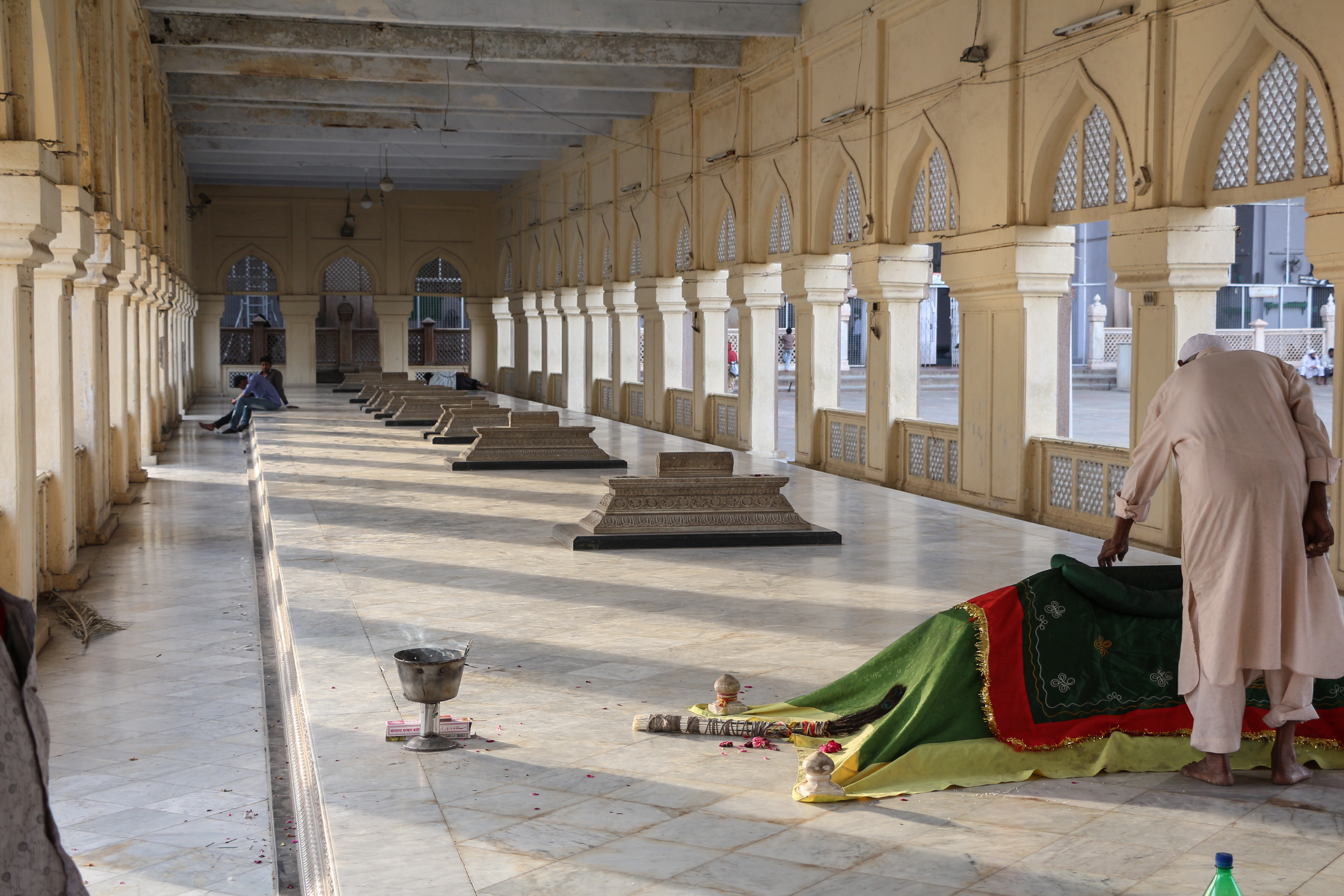
Graves of the 2nd to 6th Nizams in the Makkah Masjid

== Architecture ==
The Mecca Masjid is considered to be one of the best architectural works of the Qutb Shahis. Built on a 6.2-hectare (15.2-acre) site, the mosque is constructed entirely of dressed stone, rather than rubble or plaster. The mosque's prayer hall measures 69 by 55 metres (225 by 180 ft), and has a 23-metre-high (75 ft) ceiling. The façade of the prayer hall features five open arches, and is flanked by two minarets. Each minaret is topped by a dome, and adjoined to an arcaded balcony lining either side of the prayer hall.

The sahn (courtyard) of the mosque measures 108 square metres (1,160 sq ft). It contains a sundial, as well as the remains of a hammam. Two minarets stand on either side of the main entrance to the mosque complex.

Towards the southern end of the mosque are the marble tombs of the Asaf Jahi rulers and family members, save the first (Asaf Jah I) and the last (Asaf Jah VII). These are housed in a rectangular, arched, and canopied building, which was added in 1914 during the rule of Mir Osman Ali Khan, the last Asaf Jahi ruler. At both ends of this resting place for the Asaf Jahi's are two rectangular blocks with four minarets each. These minarets have elegant and circular balconies with low ornamental walls and arches. Above them is an octagonal inverted platter from which the rest of the minarets soar until arrested by a dome and a spire.

== See also ==
- Islam in India
- List of mosques in Telangana
- List of State Protected Monuments in Telangana
