= Azmet Jah =

Mir Muhammad Azmet Ali Khan
- Nizam of Hyderabad

Head of House of Asaf Jah
- Tenure: 14 January 2023 – present
- Coronation: 20 January 2023
- Predecessor: Mukarram Jah
- Born: 23 July 1960 (age 66); London, England
- Spouse: Zeynap Naz Güvendiren
Names
- Walashan Nawab Azmet Jah, Sahibzada Mir Muhammad Azmet Ali Khan Bahadur, The Nizam of Hyderabad and Berar, with the style of His Exalted Highness
Regnal name
- Asaf Jah IX
- Alma mater: Millfield; Long Island University; University of Southern California
- House: House of Asaf Jah
- Father: Mukarram Jah
- Mother: Esra Birgen
- Religion: Sunni Islam

Nizam Mir Muhammad Azmet Ali Khan, Asaf Jah IX, known as Azmet Jah (also spelt as Azmat Jah, born 23 July 1960), is the current head of the House of Asaf Jah and the titular 9th Nizam of Hyderabad and Berar since 20 January 2023, though Indian law has not recognized such titles since the passage of the 26th Amendment to the Indian Constitution in 1971.

== Early life, family and education ==
Azmet Jah was born on 23 July 1960 in Paddington, London, to Mukarram Jah and Esra Jah, during the reign of his great-grandfather, Mir Osman Ali Khan, the seventh Nizam of Hyderabad. He did his early schooling in London. He attended the University of Southern California, from where he graduated in 1984 with a degree in cinematograhy. In 1996, he married Zeynap Naz Güvendiren in London. They have two children, a daughter and a son.

== Career ==
He is a professional photographer and cinematographer and has worked with Steven Spielberg and Lord Richard Attenborough.

He has wielded the camera in the films Navy Seals and Life of Charlie Chaplin.

In 2011, he stated that he was working on two films, one on Mustafa Kemal Atatürk (the first President of Turkey) and another one on his great-grandfather, Osman Ali Khan, Asaf Jah VII, the Seventh Nizam of Hyderabad Deccan.

== Accession ==
Azmet Jah "acceded" to the defunct throne of the former Hyderabad State on 14 January 2023, following the death of his father, Mukarram Jah. Azmet Jah's ceremonial coronation took place on 20 January 2023. The coronation ceremony of Azmet Jah followed a pattern similar to the coronations of the Nizams before him, but it was a simple ceremony only attended by a few close friends. It was held at Khilwat Mubarak at Chowmahalla Palace in Hyderabad.

== Controversy ==
In the aftermath of Azmet Jah's coronation, the Majlis E Shabzadegan Society, consisting of over 4,500 extended family members (sahibzada and sahibzadi) of the Asaf Jahi dynasty, issued a press release alleging that Azmet Jah has neglected to take up the responsibilities of the family yet chose to take up the title of the ninth Nizam of Hyderabad.

== See also ==
- Najaf Ali Khan - Second uncle (or first cousin once removed) of Azmet Jah
- Nizam of Hyderabad
- Asaf Jahi dynasty
- Hyderabad State
- Chowmahalla Palace

Crown Prince Azmet Jah House of Asaf Jahi Born: 23 July 1960
Indian royalty
Preceded by Crown Prince Mukarram Jah	Nizam of Hyderabad; 14 January 2023 – present	Incumbent
Titles in pretence
Preceded by King Asaf Jah VIII	— TITULAR — Nizam of Hyderabad; Pretence; 14 January 2023 - present Reason for succession failure: 26th Amendment to the Constitution of India	Incumbent; Heir: Crown Prince Murad Jah
