= Hilal-i-Osmania =

Order of Hyderabad State

Awarded by Nizam of Hyderabad
- Type: Order
- Established: 11 December 1944
- Country: Hyderabad State
- Status: Dormant since 1947
- Founder: Osman Ali Khan
- Sovereign: Azmet Jah

The Hilal-i-Osmania (Urdu: ہلالِ عثمانیہ, lit. 'Osmani Crescent') was an order conferred by the Hyderabad State in India.

== Description ==
Mir Osman Ali Khan instituted this order on 11 December 1944. It was awarded for acts of courage or self-sacrifice carried out in the public interest. It was awarded in a single class, without distinction of position, occupation, or gender. It was designed by Zain Yar Jung.

== See also ==
- Tamgha-i-Khusrow-i-Deccan
- Tamgha-i-Asafia
