= Tamgha-i-Asafia =

Order of Hyderabad State

Awarded by Nizam of Hyderabad
- Type: Order
- Established: 11 December 1944
- Country: Hyderabad State
- Status: Dormant since 1947
- Founder: Osman Ali Khan
- Sovereign: Azmet Jah

The Tamgha-i-Asafia (Urdu: تمغۂ آصفیہ, lit. 'Medal of Asafia') was an order conferred by the Hyderabad State in India. The term Asafia refers to the Asaf Jahi dynasty. Asaf Jah was the honorary title conferred upon Chin Qilich Khan by the Mughal emperor Muhammad Shah.

== Description ==
Mir Osman Ali Khan instituted this order on 11 December 1944. It was designed by Zain Yar Jung.

It was awarded in civil departments and could be conferred posthumously. It was awarded irrespective of position, occupation, or gender. It was awarded in three classes: gold, silver, and bronze. Gold was limited to three recipients at any one time, silver to six recipients, and bronze to ten recipients. The statutes permitted the granting of extra orders for the prompt recognition of services.

== See also ==
- Hilal-i-Osmania
- Tamgha-i-Khusrow-i-Deccan
