= Tamgha-i-Khusrow-i-Deccan =

Order of Hyderabad State

Awarded by Nizam of Hyderabad
- Type: Order
- Established: 11 December 1944
- Country: Hyderabad State
- Status: Dormant since 1947
- Founder: Osman Ali Khan
- Sovereign: Azmet Jah

The Tamgha-i-Khusrow-i-Deccan (Urdu: تمغۂ خسروِ دکن, lit. 'Medal of the Khusrow of the Deccan') was an order conferred by the Hyderabad State in India.

== Description ==
Mir Osman Ali Khan instituted this order on 11 December 1944. It was designed by Zain Yar Jung. This order was awarded to recognise important and valuable services in the advancement of the public interest. It was awarded irrespective of position, occupation, or gender. It was awarded in three classes: gold, silver, and bronze.

Gold was limited to two recipients at any one time, silver to three recipients, and bronze to ten recipients.

The statutes permitted the granting of extra orders for the prompt recognition of services.

== See also ==
- Hilal-i-Osmania
- Tamgha-i-Asafia
