= Reginald Clancy =

British economist

Reginald Clancy was a British economist who served as the Finance minister of Indian princely state of Hyderabad from 1918 to 1919. His signature also appeared on the banknotes of the Hyderabadi rupee.

== Early life ==
He was educated in the United Kingdom, but he worked in India for a major part of his life.

== Career ==
=== Secretary of State for India ===
He also served at the India Office as a member of the Council of the Secretary of State for India.

=== Hyderabad State ===
He served as the finance minister of Hyderabad State.

== Hyderabadi rupee ==
His signature appeared on the very first issue of the Hyderabadi rupee:

- PS261. 1 rupee. ND. (1919) Black on peach underprint. Back light brown.
- PS262. 1 rupee. ND. (1919) Bicoloured.
- PS264. 10 rupees. FE1327. (1916) Yellow-brown and black on lilac underprint. Series AB.

== See also ==
- Hyderabadi rupee
