= Moin Nawaz Jung =

Indian politician

- Occupation: Minister for the Nizam of Hyderabad
- Relatives: Mir Laik Ali (brother-in-law)

Nawab Moin Nawaz Jung was the Minister for Finance and External Affairs of the Hyderabad State, under the Nizam Osman Ali Khan's reign.

== Family ==
Moin Nawaz Jung was the brother-in-law of Mir Laik Ali, who served as the last Prime Minister of Hyderabad.

== Career ==
Prior to the Partition of India, Moin Nawaz Jung was a member of the Nizam's Government. He continued in various positions until the Operation Polo and the accession of Hyderabad to India.

- In 1946, he was the Political Secretary and was appointed to head the negotiations for political reforms in the State, with the goal of finding a formula acceptable to both the Hindus of Hyderabad State Congress (Congress) and the Muslims of Ittehad-ul-Muslimeen (Ittehad). The reforms were eventually announced on 27 July 1946.
- In 1947, he was the minister for Police and Information. After the Standstill Agreement was negotiated by the Nizam's delegation with the Government of India, the leader of the Ittehad, Kasim Razvi, led a coup, blocking the delegation from the leaving the state. Subsequently, the Nizam repudiated the agreement and refused to sign it under pressure from Ittehad. Moin Nawaz Jung was among the minority of members in the Executive Council who opposed the standstill agreement.
- Following the coup, the Nizam sent a new delegation on 31 October 1947, in which Moin Nawaz Jung was included. Jung pleaded for the negotiations restart from the original proposal made by the state, which was "indignantly refused" by Delhi.
- On 28 November 1947, the Nizam appointed Mir Laik Ali as the new prime minister of the state. Laik Ali is said to have been inexperienced in administration as well as politics. Moin Nawaz Jung exerted considerable influence on him as well as the affairs of the state. Moin Nawaz Jung served as the minister for Finance and Externational Affairs in Laik Ali's cabinet.
- On 4 September 1948, with India's police action looming, the Nizam's government decided to send a delegation to the United Nations at Lake Success, headed by Moin Nawaz Jung, for settling the status of the Hyderabad State.

The Banknotes of Hyderabad had his signature during 1947-48. The Nizam had entrusted to him the £1million transfer to the UK Bank was his finance minister Moin Nawaz Jung.

== Bibliography ==
- Benichou, Lucien D. (2000), From Autocracy to Integration: Political Developments in Hyderabad State, 1938-1948, Orient Blackswan, ISBN 978-81-250-1847-6
- Raghavan, Srinath (2010), War and Peace in Modern India, Palgrave Macmillan, pp. 101–, ISBN 978-1-137-00737-7
