= Jubilee Hall, Hyderabad =

Royal palace built in 1913

Coordinates: 17.398712°N 78.467821°E

Jubilee Hall
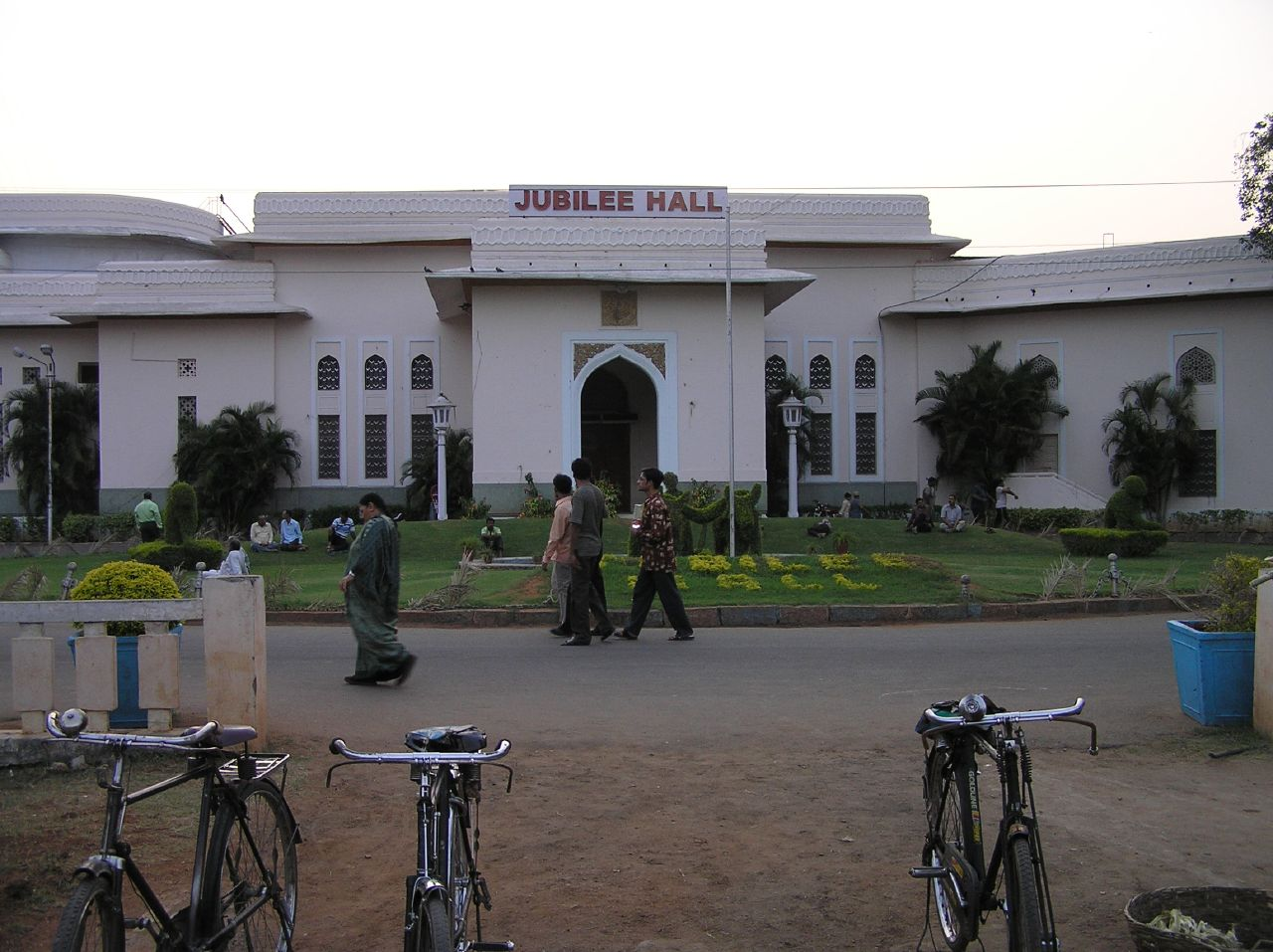
- Interactive map of the Jubilee Hall area

General information
- Architectural style: Indo-Persian
- Location: Public Gardens, Hyderabad, Telangana, India
- Completed: 1913

Design and construction
- Architect: Zain Yar Jung

Jubilee Hall is a royal palace built in 1913 during the reign of Mir Osman Ali Khan of erstwhile Hyderabad state in India. It is considered one of the architectural masterpieces of Hyderabad.

It is located in the green lawns of Public Gardens, which were earlier known as Bagh-e-Aam.

== History ==
In 1937, the silver jubilee coronation of Osman Ali Khan was held here, hence the name. A special gold plated chair was made on this occasion with his crest inscribed. The chair is now exhibited at Purani Haveli.

The Nizam, on the occasion, received gifts and mementos. The Royal works and paintings from the Durbar still adorn the building.

At the time the world was yet to see another Indian spectacle of pomp and power as that of the Jubilee Durbar, with warlike display of 10,000 Hyderabad troops.

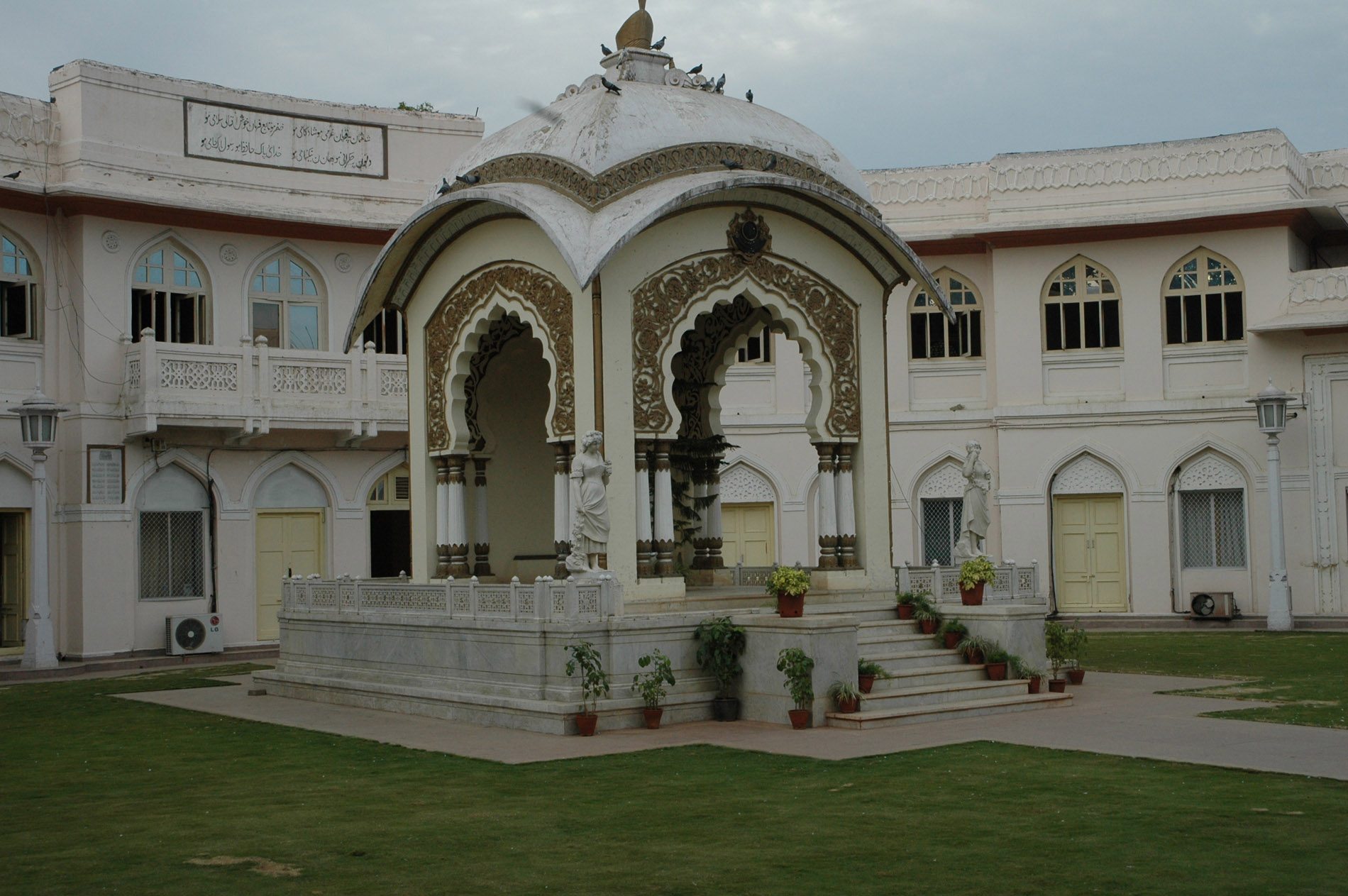
Pavilion at the Jubilee Hall

== Architecture ==
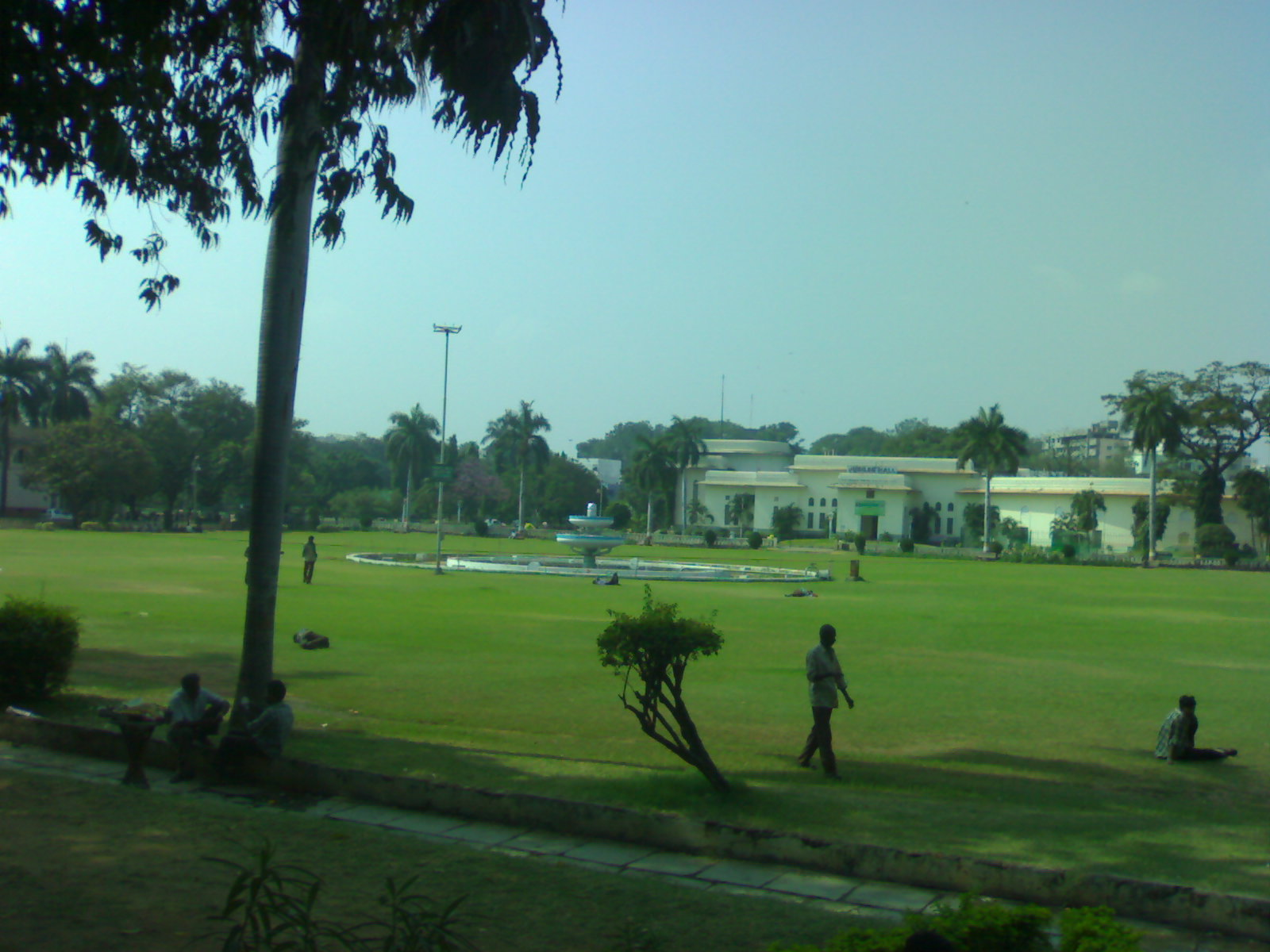
Jubilee Hall

The building was designed by Zain Yar Jung. The building has an elegant facade built in the Indo-Persian style. At the center, a small but high stage for the throne of Nizam was built, in the shape of 'Dastar'(Crown) of the Nizam. It is clearly visible as the white square in the middle.

The huge rectangular hall of the Jubilee Hall, served as the State's Legislative Council for 27 years, before the Council moved to its present building. Jubilee Hall now serves as a state conference hall and for State Government functions.

== See also ==
- Chowmahalla Palace
- Purani Haveli
- King Kothi Palace
- Falaknuma Palace
