= Public Gardens, Hyderabad =

Park in Hyderabad, India

Public Garden
- Bagh-e-Aam
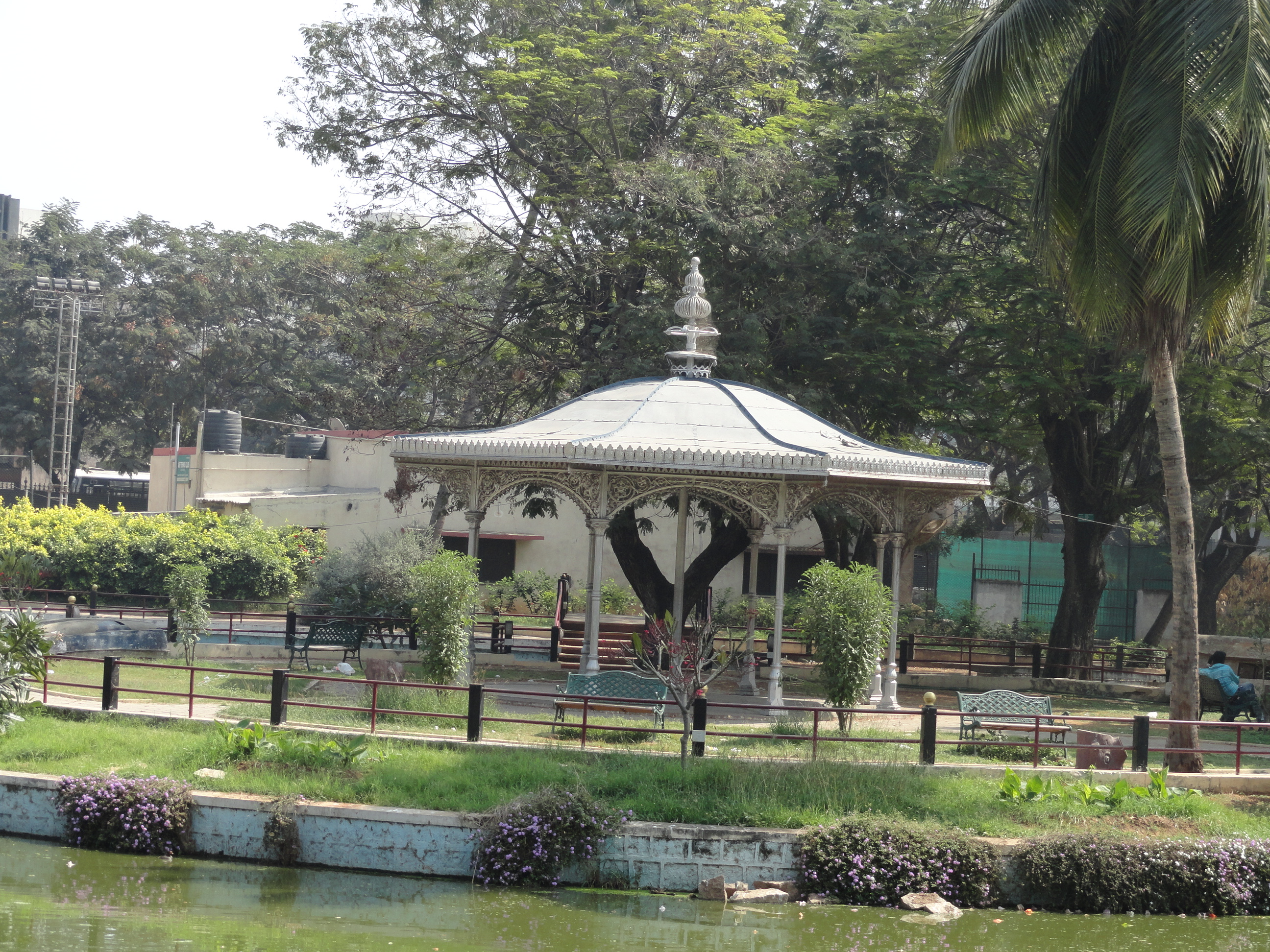
- View of a public garden.

- Location within Hyderabad
- Type: urban park
- Location: Hyderabad, Telangana, India
- Coordinates: 17°23′54″N 78°28′10″E
- Created: 1846; 180 years ago
- Operator: Hotriculture Department, Government of Telangana
- Public transit: Nampally Metro Station

Public Gardens also known as Bagh-e-Aam is a historic park located in the heart of the city of Hyderabad, India. It was built in 1846 by the 7th Nizam of Hyderabad and is the oldest park in Hyderabad.

== History ==
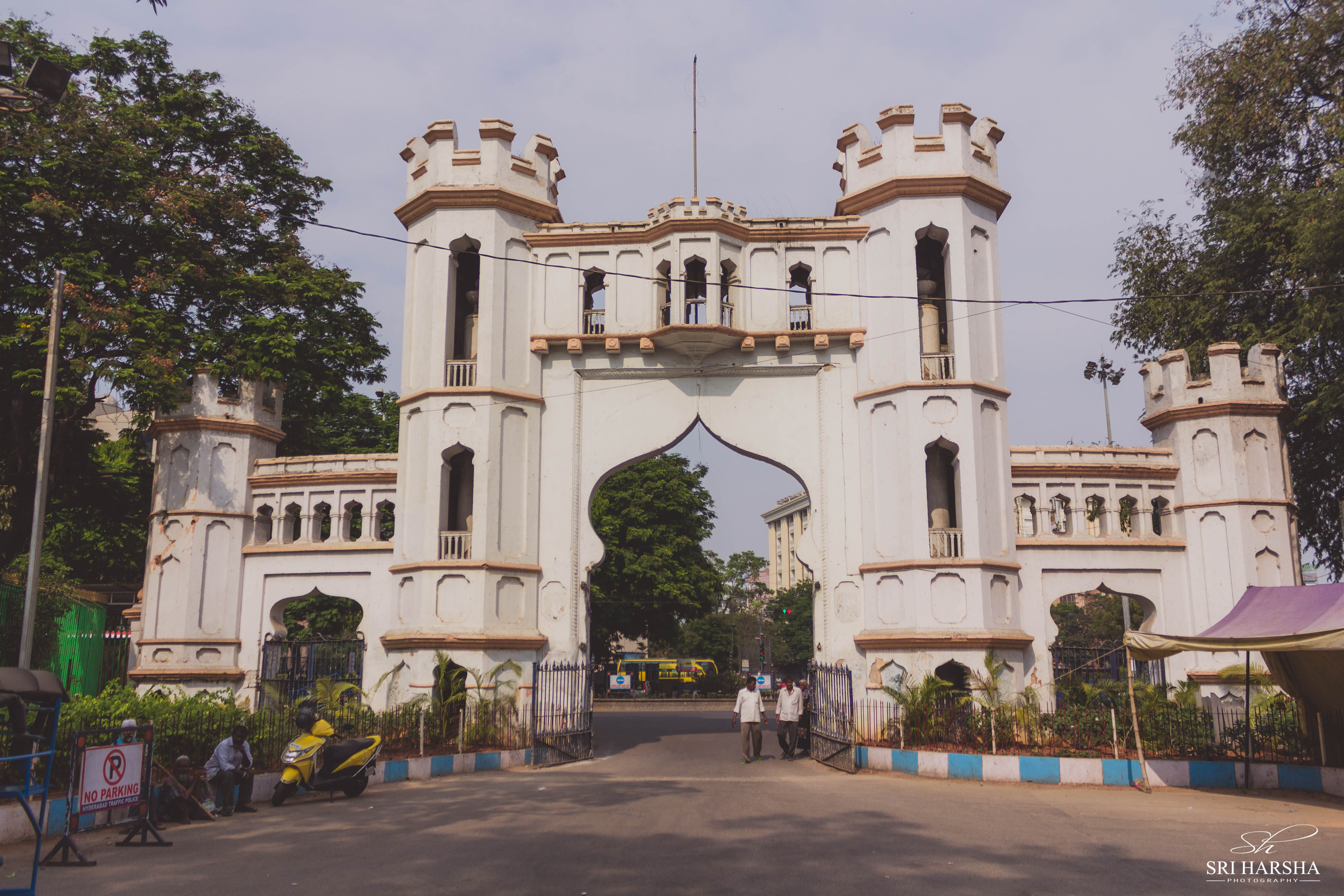
Entrance to the Public Gardens

Public Gardens also known as Bagh-e-Aam (Bagheaam) or Bagham. In Urdu "Bagh" means Garden and Aam or "Aam Jana" means "the public" was built in 1846 during the period of the Nizam's. Post-1980 it started being known as Public Gardens. The area of the park was 54 acres (220,000 m^{2}) and included a 7 acres (28,000 m^{2}) pond. A portion of the land occupied by the park was given to the railways for building Hyderabad railway station. In 1905 a portion of the garden was used to construct Jubilee Hall and part of the pond was filled up. Gradually the area occupied by the garden reduced as several buildings such as State Legislative Assembly, State Museum, Jawahar Bal Bhavan, Indira Priyadarshini Auditorium, Lalitha Kala Thoranam, and Telugu University were constructed. A large fountain existing in the public garden lawns since 1937 was demolished in 2019 for celebrating Telangana Formation Day.

== See also ==
- Nizams of Hyderabad
- 6th Nizam - Mir Mahbub Ali Khan
- 7th Nizam - Mir Osman Ali Khan
