= Hyderabadi rupee =

Official currency of Hyderabad State of India from 1918 to 1959

Osmania sicca
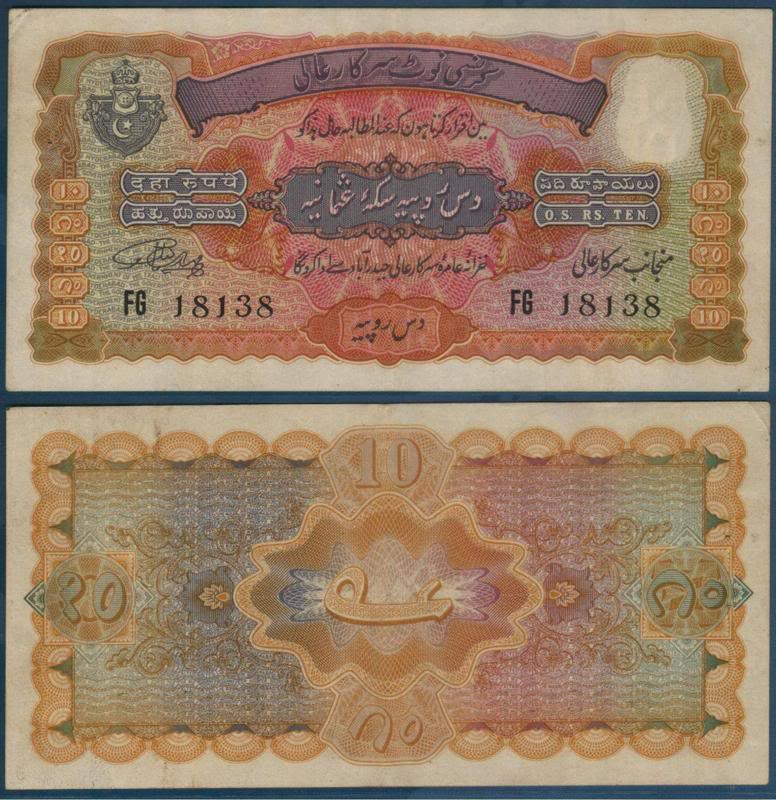
- Hyderabad state OS Rupees10 banknote (10 rupees Osmania Sicca)

Unit
- Unit: rupee

Denominations
- Subunit
- 1/16: anna
- 1/192: pai
- Banknotes: 1, 5, 10, 100, 1000 rupees
- Coins: 1,2 pai, 1/2, 1, 2, 4, 8 annas, 1 rupee

Demographics
- User(s): Hyderabad

Issuance
- Central bank: State Bank of Hyderabad

Valuation
- Pegged with: Indian rupee: 6 Indian rupees = 7 Osmania sicca rupees
- This infobox shows the latest status before this currency was rendered obsolete.

The Hyderabadi Rupee (better known as "Osmania Sicca") was the currency of the Hyderabad State from 1918 to 1959. It co-existed with the Indian rupee from 1950. Like the Indian rupee, it was divided into 16 annas, each of 12 pai. Coins were issued in copper (later bronze) for denominations of 1 and 2 pai and 1/2 anna, in cupro-nickel (later bronze) for 1 anna and in silver for 2, 4 and 8 annas and 1 rupee.

Hyderabad was the only Indian princely state that was permitted to continue issuing its notes after it was annexed by the Dominion of India in 1948 and joined the Republic of India in 1950.

== History ==
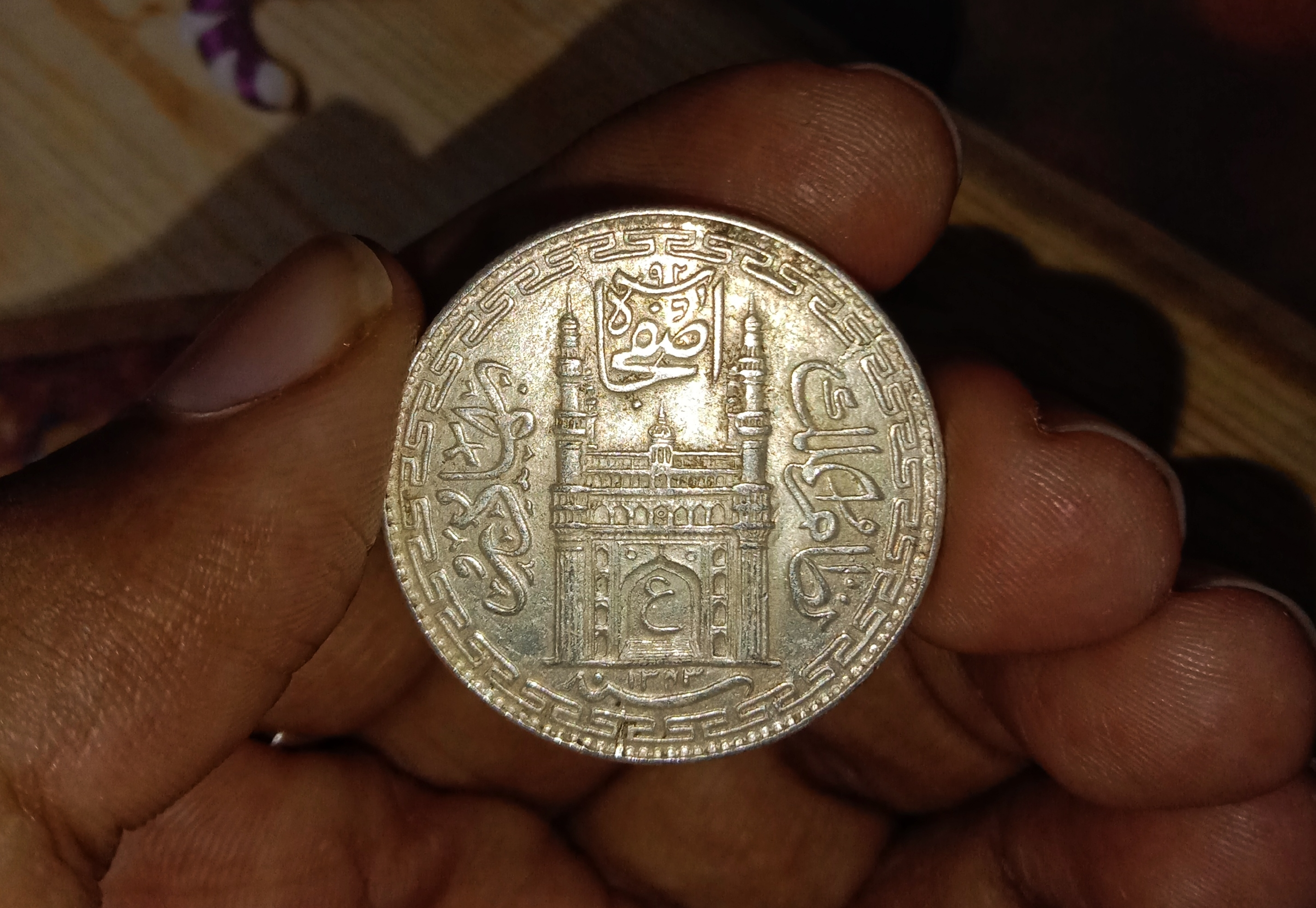
Hyderabadi silver Rupee featuring the Charminar

The Government of Hyderabad made several efforts to organise private bankers to set up a banking company that could issue paper money. The British, however, resisted the attempts of Indian princely state to issue paper currency. The acute shortage of silver during the First World War and the contributions of Hyderabad to the British war effort led them to accept, in 1918, paper currency in denominations of 10 and 100 rupees issued under the Hyderabad Currency Act.

The currency was designated as Osmania Sicca (OS). One- and five-rupee notes were subsequently issued in 1919, and one-thousand-rupee notes were issued in 1926. After the setting up of the India Currency Notes Press at Nashik, Hyderabadi notes came to be printed there.

In 1942, the Government of Hyderabad established the Hyderabad State Bank, with the responsibility, inter alia, of managing the OS. Hyderabad continued to mint its coins until 1948 when India occupied the state after the Nizam refused to cede it to the new Dominion.

In 1950, the Indian rupee was introduced alongside the local currency, with the relationship of 7 Hyderabadi rupees = 6 Indian rupees being used. In 1951, the Hyderabadi rupee ceased to be issued and the Indian rupee became the main circulating currency, although the Hyderabadi rupee was not demonetised until 1959.

After the merger of Hyderabad State with India, the Hyderabadi currency was gradually demonetised in stages, starting from January 1953. The next stage was in 1955 and finally, it was decided that Hyderabadi Rupee would no longer remain a valid currency after 30 June 1959

== Banknotes ==
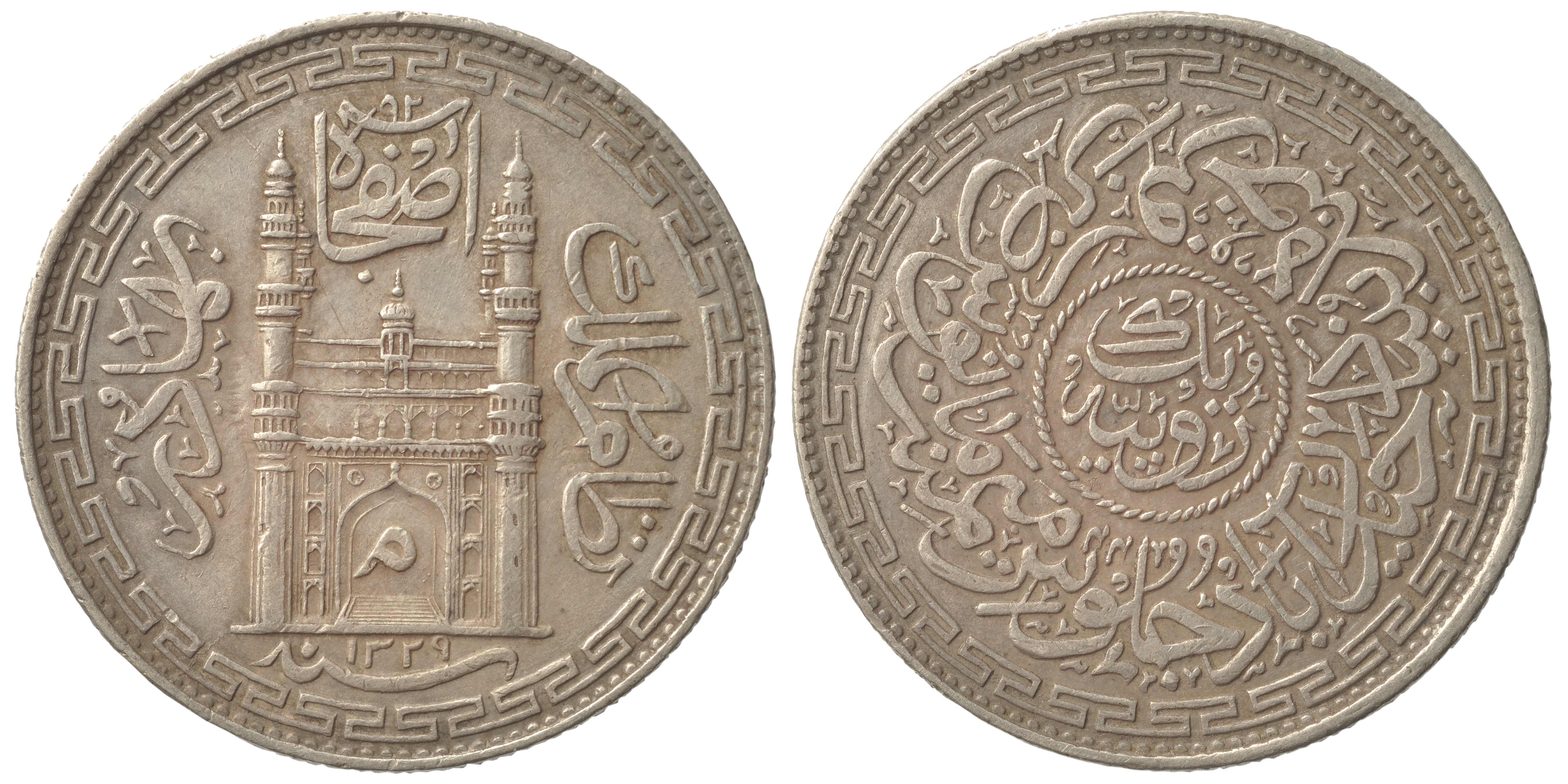
One Rupee coin issued by Mir Mahbub Ali Khan, 1329 AH (1911 CE).

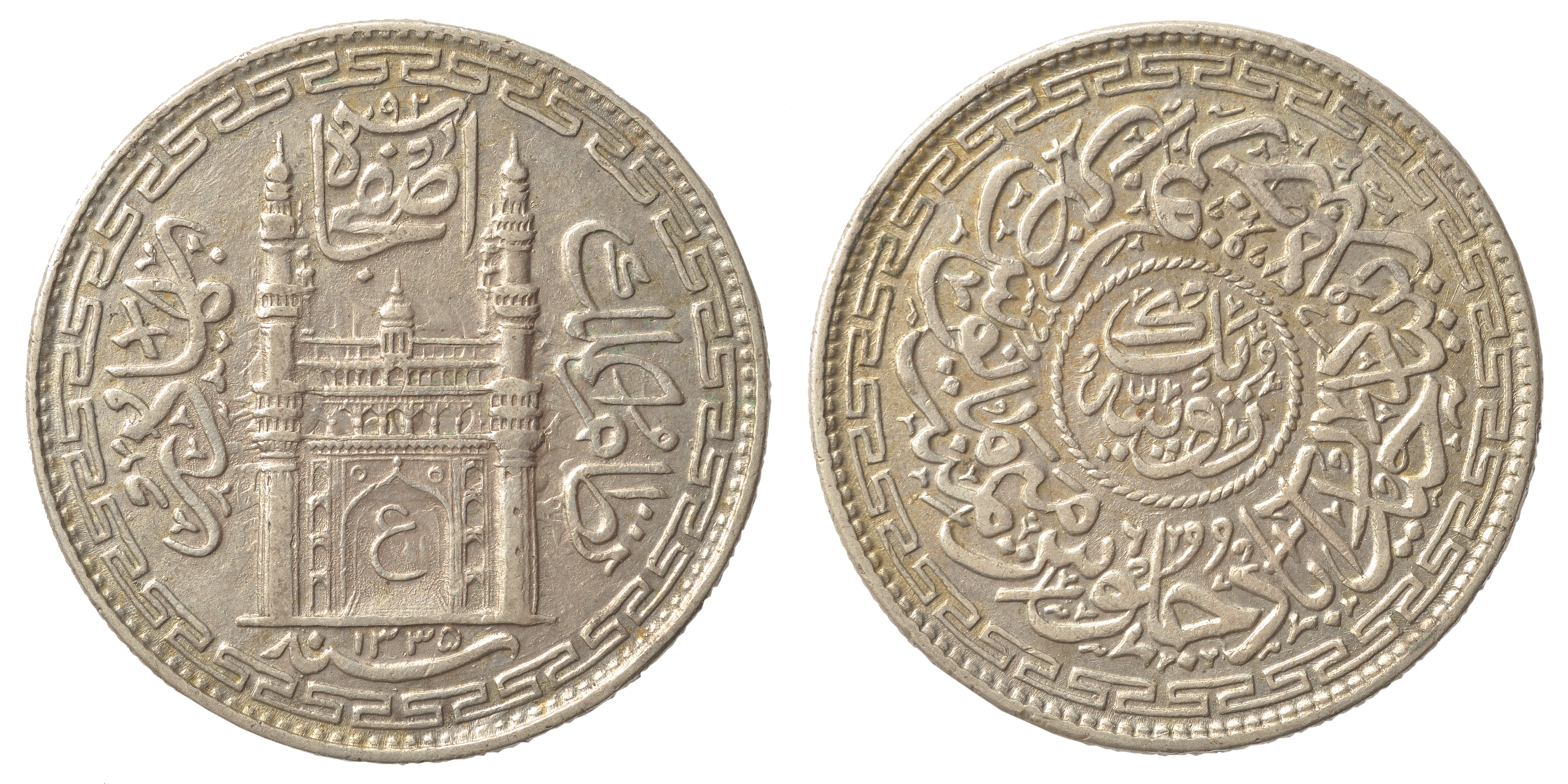
Hyderabad - One Rupee Coin issued by Mir Osman Ali Khan - 1335 AH Silver (The Urdu letter "Ain" inside the Charminar represents 1st letter of the word "Osman")

The banknotes of Hyderabad were issued from 1918 until 1953. The ruling Nizam of Hyderabad was Mir Osman Ali Khan. Notes issued as early as 1916 have been reported. The notes are dated in the Fasli Era, so adding 589 to the FE date will convert it to the AD date. They were printed in Urdu, with the value of currency written in Urdu, Marathi, Telugu, Kannada and English on them.

In 1932, a quantity of unissued, but water-stained Hyderabadi notes in 5-, 10-, and 100-rupee denominations were recovered from the SS Egypt, which sank off the island of Ushant near Brest, northern France in 1922. Many of these were given a special stamping and sold as souvenirs. These notes were in the process of being shipped from England where they had been printed. These notes are of historic interest to notaphilists. Some of the notes are printed slightly later than the dates that they bear.

The double letter serial number prefix determines what series the note is located in. Some of the 1939-53 issues have a single serial number of prefix series code letters.

Hali Osmania paper currency in Hyderabad State that was returned to the treasury from 1 July 1953 to 31 October 1953 is O. S. Rs 8.05 crores including one-rupee notes. and O. S.Rs 18.42 crores including rupee coins and small coins as of 28 November 1953.

=== Signature chart ===
The signature also provides a clue to the approximate period when a note was issued. It is not yet certain what titles the signatories held (in English), as the inscriptions are in Urdu.

- Sir Reginald R. Clancy (1918–19)
- Fakhr-ud-Din Ahmad (1919–20)
- Hyder Nawaz Jung (1921–36)
- Fakhr-Yar Jung (1936–38 and 1940–41)
- Mehdi Yar Jung (1939)
- Sir Ghulam Muhammad (1941–45)
- Liaquat Jung (1945 and 1946–47)
- Zahed Husain (1945–46)
- Zahed Jung (1946)
- Moin Nawaz Jung (1947–48)
- D.R. Pradhan (1948–49)
- C.V.S. Rao (1950)
- Dr. G.S. Melkote (1950–53)

=== First issue (1916/18-19) Sir Reginald R. Clancy ===
- PS261. 1 rupee. ND. (1919) Black on peach underprint. Backlight brown.
- PS262. 1 rupee. ND. (1919) Bicoloured.
- PS264. 10 rupees. FE1327. (1916) Yellow-brown and black on lilac underprint. Series AB.

=== Second issue (1919-20) Fakhr-ud-Din Ahmad ===
- PS263a. 5 rupees. FE1331. (1920). Green. Series IQ. Without signature. Sea salvage note (most with special stamping). Unissued.
- PS265a. 10 rupees. FE1331. (1920). Yellow-brown and black on lilac underprint. Series AI. Without signature. Sea salvage note (most with special stamping). Unissued.
- PS266a. 100 rupees. FE1331. (1920). Blue and black on tan underprint. Series PS. Without signature. Sea salvage note (most with special stamping). Unissued.

=== Third issue (1921-36) Hyder Nawaz Jung ===
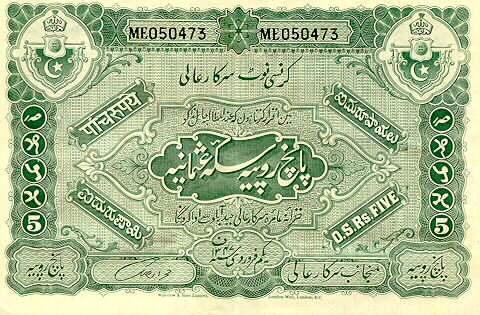
Five-rupee note from Hyderabad, dated 1 February 1347 A.H. (1928/9)

- PS263b. 5 rupees. FE1337. (1926). Green. Series LX.
- PS263c. 5 rupees. FE1346. (1935). Green. Series MC.
- PS265b. 10 rupees. FE1333. (1922). Yellow-brown and black on lilac underprint. Series AN.
- PS265c. 10 rupees. FE1338. (1927). Series ?.
- PS265d. 10 rupees. FE1339. (1928). Series BK.
- PS265e. 10 rupees. FE1342. (1931). Series BW.
- PS265f. 10 rupees. FE1344. (1933). Series ?.
- PS265g. 10 rupees. FE1346. (1935). Series CH.
- PS266b. 100 rupees. FE1339. (1928). Blue and black on tan underprint. Series PY-PZ.
- PS266c. 100 rupees. FE1339. (1928). Series QA.
- PS266d. 100 rupees. FE1334. (1923). Series PT.
- PS267. 1,000 rupees. FE1340. (1929); FE1341. (1930). Red and black on light green underprint.

=== Fourth issue (1936-38) Fakhr-Yar Jung (1st time) ===
- PS263d. 5 rupees. FE1347. (1936). Green. Series MD-ME.
- PS265h. 10 rupees. FE1347. (1936). Yellow-brown and black on lilac underprint.
- PS273a. 5 rupees. ND. (1938; 1940–41). Green and multicoloured.
- PS274a. 10 rupees. ND. (1938; 1940–41). Light brown and multicoloured.
- PS275a. 100 rupees. ND. (1938; 1940–41). Blue and multicoloured. Series QC.

=== Fifth issue (1939) Mehdi Yar Jung ===
- PS271a. 1 rupee. ND. (1939). Brown and multicoloured. Series A.
- PS273b. 5 rupees. ND. (1939). Green and multicoloured.
- PS274b. 10 rupees. ND. (1939). Light brown and multicoloured.
- PS275b. 100 rupees. ND. (1939). Blue and multicoloured.

=== Sixth issue (1940-41) Fakhr-Yar Jung (2nd time) ===
- PS271b. 1 rupee. ND. (1940–41). Brown and multicoloured. Series B-M.

=== Seventh issue (1941-45) Sir Malik Ghulam Muhammad ===
- PS271c. 1 rupee. ND. (1941–45). Brown and multicoloured. Series B-X. (two signatories).
- PS273c. 5 rupees. ND. (1941–45). Green and multicoloured.
- PS274c. 10 rupees. ND. (1941–45). Light brown and multicoloured.
- PS275c. 100 rupees. ND (1941–45). Blue and multicoloured. Series QN and QP.

=== Eighth issue (1945) Liaquat Jung (1st time) ===
- PS271c. 1 rupee. ND. (1945). Brown and multicoloured. Series B-X. (two signatories).
- PS275d. 100 rupees. ND. (1945; 1946–47). Blue and multicoloured. Series QS.

=== Ninth issue (1945-46) Zahed Husain ===
- PS271d. 1 rupee. ND. (1945–46). Brown and multicoloured. Series S-W.
- PS272b. 1 rupee. ND. (1945–46).
- PS273d. 5 rupees. ND. (1945–46). Green and multicoloured.
- PS274d. 10 rupees. ND. (1945–46). Light brown and multicoloured.
- PS275e. 100 rupees. ND. (1945–46). Blue and multicoloured. Series QY.

=== Tenth issue(1946) Zahed Jung ===
- PS271e. 1 rupee. ND. (1946). Brown and multicoloured. Series X-Y.
- PS272c. 1 rupee. ND. (1946).

=== Eleventh issue (1946-47) Liaquat Jung (2nd time) ===
- PS272a. 1 rupee. ND. (1946–47). Brown and multicoloured. Series Z and AB.
- PS273e. 5 rupees. ND. (1946–47). Green and multicoloured.
- PS274e. 10 rupees. ND. (1946–47). Light brown and multicoloured.

=== Twelfth issue (1947-48) Moin Nawaz Jung ===
This issue is historic as it was issued in the short period that Hyderabad attempted to become independent as a constitutional monarchy within the British Commonwealth.

- PS272d. 1 rupee. ND. (1947–48). Brown and multicoloured.

=== Thirteenth issue (1948-49) D.R. Pradhan ===
This was the first issue after Hyderabad was liberated from the Nizam's rule and forced to be incorporated into the Dominion of India as a result of Operation Polo.

- PS272e. 1 rupee. ND. (1948–49). Brown and multicoloured.

Currency signed by Dr. G.S. Melkote

=== Fourteenth issue (1950) C.V.S. Rao ===
This was the first issue after India became a republic (26 January 1950).

- PS272f. 1 rupee. ND. (1950). Brown and multicoloured.

=== Fifteenth issue (1950-53) Dr. G.S. Melkote ===
- PS272g. 1 rupee. ND. (1950–53). Brown and multicoloured.
