= Zain Yar Jung =

Indian architect (1889–1961)

Nawab Zain Yar Jung
- Born: Syed Zainuddin Hussain Khan; 1889
- Died: 1961
- Occupation: Architect
- Children: Sadath Ali Khan
- Awards: Padma Bhushan (1956)
- Buildings: Jubilee Hall; Aza Khane Zehra; Raj Bhavan

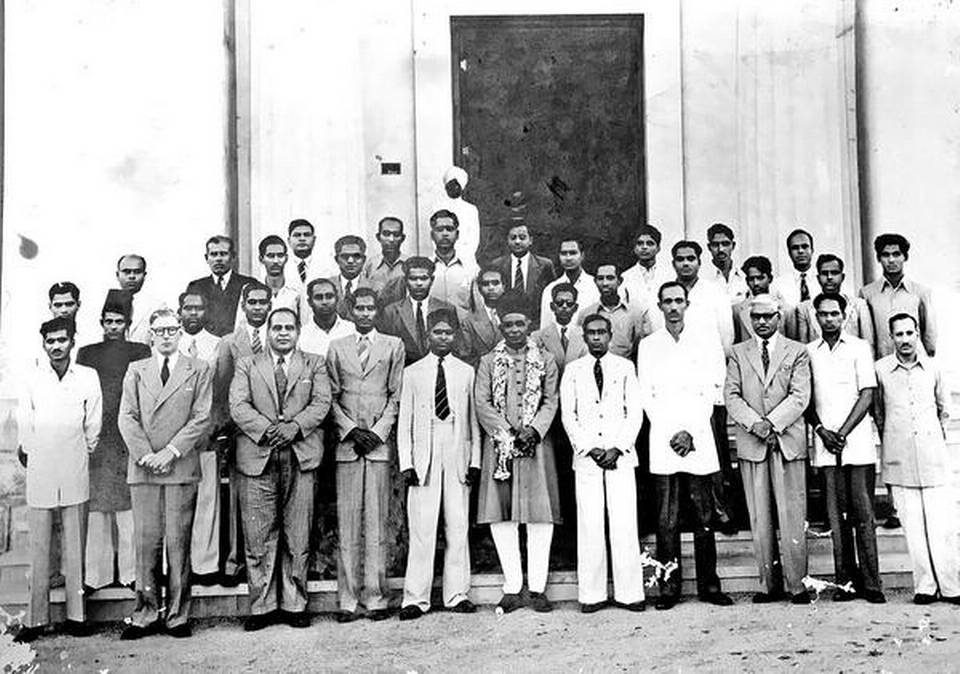
Zain Yar Jung (first row, sixth from right), with Osmania University engineering students.

Zain Yar Jung (1889–1961) was an architect. He served as the Chief Architect of Hyderabad State.

== Career as Architect ==
Zain Yar Jung was associated with the construction of Osman Sagar, The Badshahi Mosque, and Himayat Sagar.

The Nizam sent two eminent architects, Nawab Zain Yar Jung and Syed Ali Raza, on a study tour of beautiful buildings around the world. They met noted Belgian architect, Ernest Jasper, in Egypt and enlisted his services for designing a university at Hyderabad. He worked on the Osmania University under Jasper.

== Political career ==
He was later sent as an emissary of the Nizam to negotiate terms of the merger of Hyderabad State with India.

He was granted the title of Nawab by the Nizam of Hyderabad. He received Padma Bhushan in 1956.
