= Hyderabad State =

Princely state in southern India (1724–1948)

Coordinates: 17°00′N 78°50′E

Nizamate of Hyderabad
- 1724–1948
- Flag; (1947–1948); Emblem; (1947–1948)
- Motto: Al-ʿAẓmatu Lillāh ("Greatness belongs to God"); Ya Osman ("Oh Osman")
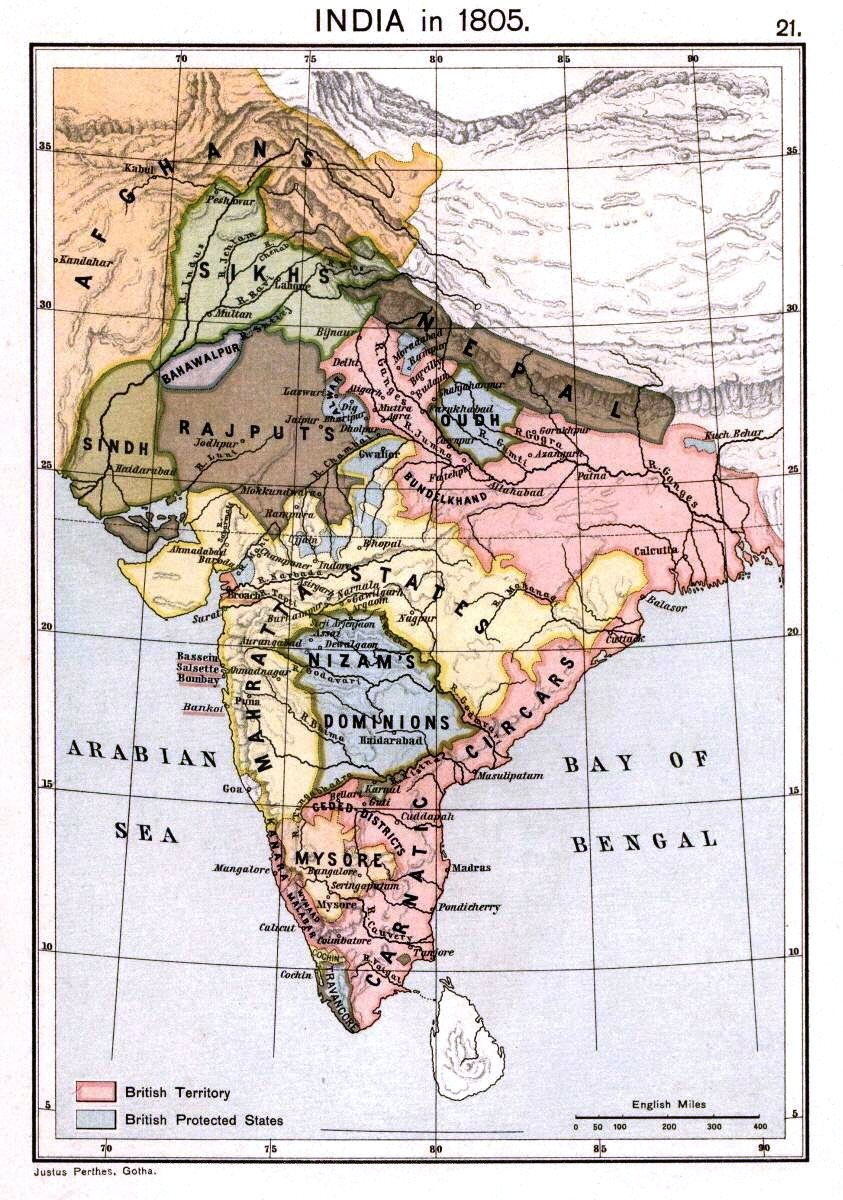
- Status: Vassal state of the Mughal Empire (de jure, 1724–1748); Protectorate of the Maratha Empire (1748–1818); Subsidiary state under Company Raj (1798–1858); Princely state of British Raj (1858–1947); Unrecognised independent state (1947–1948)
- Capital: Aurangabad (1724–1763); Hyderabad (1763–1948)
- Official languages: Telugu (administration and court; dynastic); Persian (Court and revenue 1724–1886) and Hindustani (Urdu) (dynastic); Urdu (For Court and revenue from 1886–1948)
- Common languages: Telugu (48.2%); Marathi (26.4%); Kannada (12.3%); Deccani (10.3%)
- Religion: 13% Islam (official); Sunni Islam; Shia Islam; Non-denominational Islam; 81% Hinduism; 6% Christianity (Note: (spread among Anglo-Indian population expanding to Secunderabad and Hyderabad)) and others
- Government: Absolute monarchy
- Nizam
  - 1724–1748: Asaf Jah I (first)
  - 1911–1948: Asaf Jah VII (last)
- Prime Minister
  - 1724–1730: Iwaz Khan (first)
  - 1947–1948: Mir Laiq Ali (last)
- Historical era: .
  - Established: 31 July 1724
  - Telangana Rebellion: 1946
  - Annexation by India: 18 September 1948

Area
- 1941: 214,187 km^{2} (82,698 sq mi)

Population
  - 1941: 16,338,534
- Currency: Hyderabadi rupee
Preceded by	Succeeded by
Hyderabad Subah, Mughal Empire	Hyderabad State (1948–1956)
- Today part of: India

Hyderabad State, also referred to as the Nizamate of Hyderabad, was a princely state in the Deccan region of south-central India with its capital at the city of Hyderabad. It is now divided into the present-day state of Telangana, the Kalyana-Karnataka region of Karnataka, and the Marathwada region of Maharashtra in the Republic of India.

The state was ruled from 1724 to 1948 by the Nizam, who was initially a viceroy of the Mughal Empire in the Deccan. It had also become a protectorate under the Maratha Empire, until the empire's overthrow in 1818 and gradually became one of the first princely states to come under British paramountcy by signing a subsidiary alliance agreement. At the time of the British Raj in 1901, the state had a revenue of ₹41.7 million (equivalent to ₹16 billion or US$180 million in 2026). The native inhabitants of Hyderabad State, regardless of ethnic origin, are called "Mulki" (countryman), a term still used today. The ruler of the state was also called as Nizam-ul-Mulk (Nizam of the country).

The dynasty declared itself an independent monarchy during the final years of the British Raj. After the partition of India, Hyderabad signed a standstill agreement with the new Dominon of India, continuing all previous arrangements except for the stationing of Indian troops in the state. Hyderabad's location in the middle of the Indian Union, as well as its diverse cultural heritage led to India's invasion and annexation of the state in 1948. Subsequently, Mir Osman Ali Khan, the seventh Nizam, signed an instrument of accession, joining India.

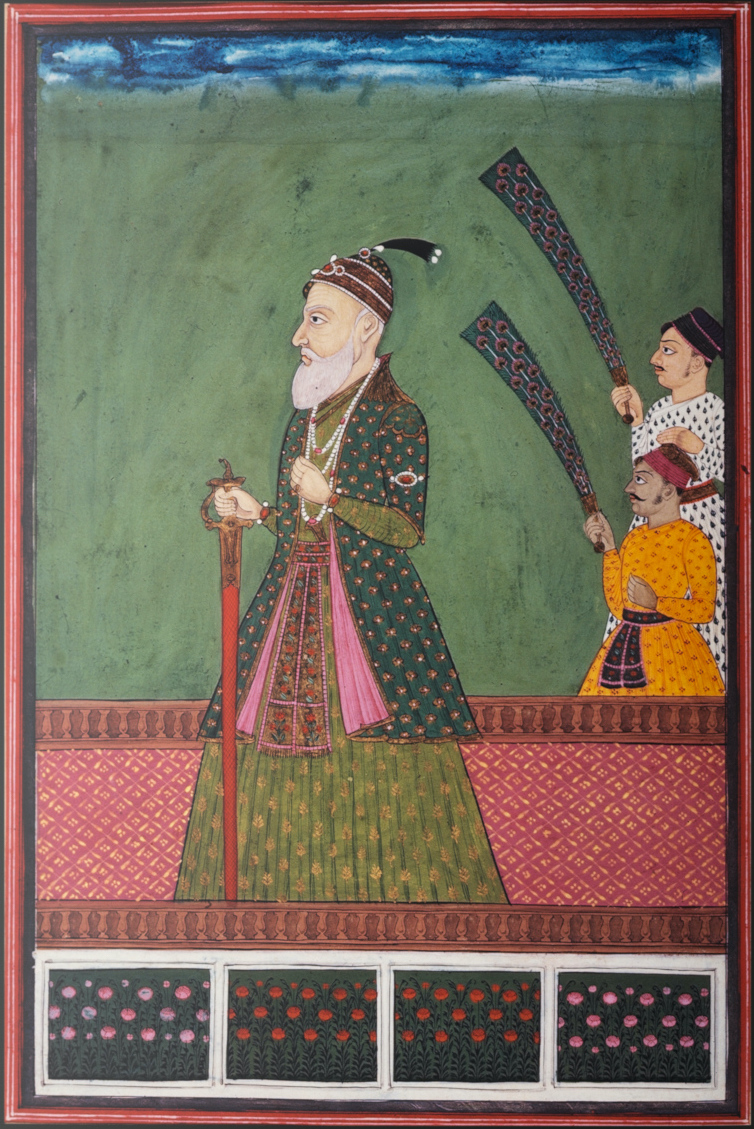
Painting of First Nizam ul Mulk

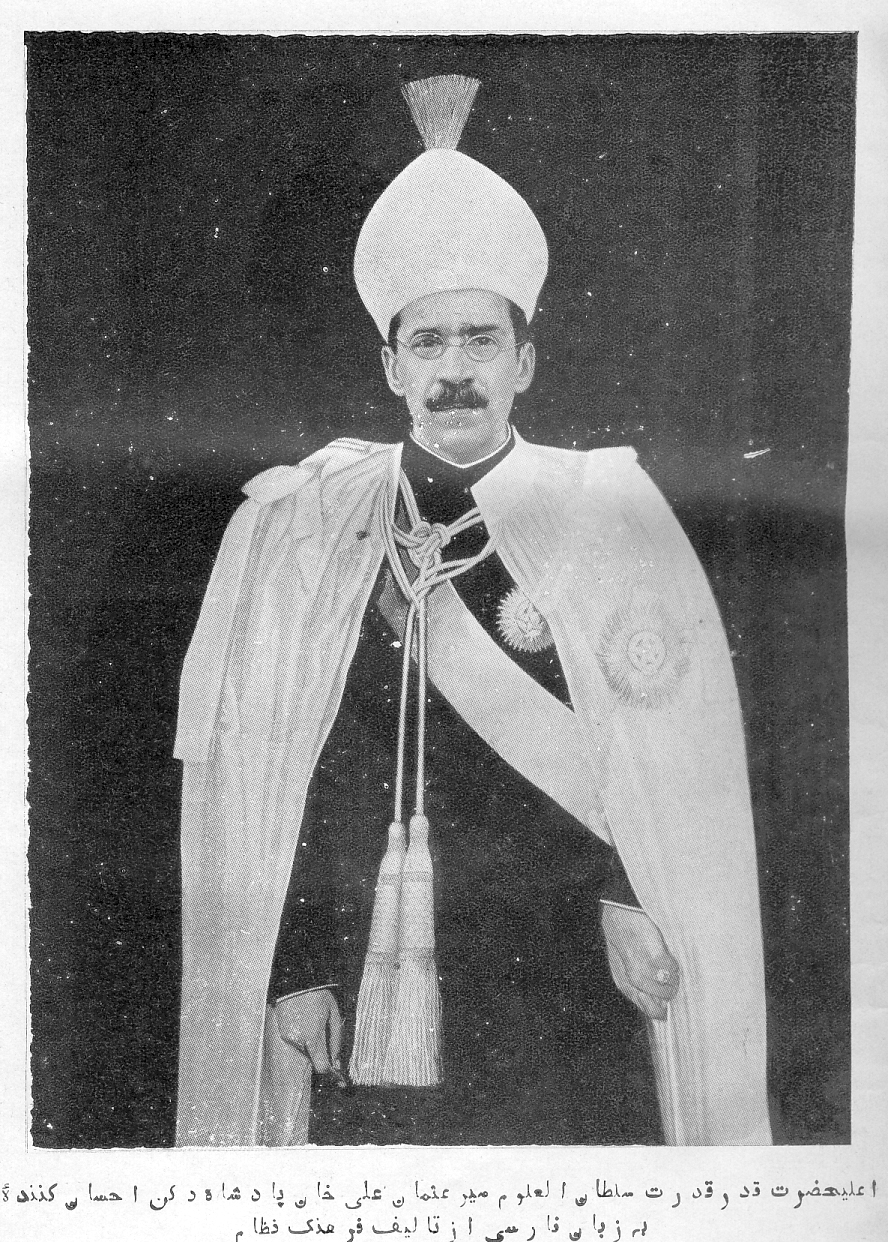
On 22 February 1937, a cover story by Time called Osman Ali Khan, Asif Jah VII the wealthiest man in the world

== History ==
=== Early history and Maratha suzerainty ===
Hyderabad State was founded by Mir Qamar-ud-din Khan who was the governor of Deccan under the Mughals from 1713 to 1721. In 1724, following the Battle of Shakar Kheda, he resumed rule from the Mughal provincial capital of Aurangabad, under the title of Asaf Jah (granted by Mughal Emperor Muhammad Shah). His other title, Nizam ul-Mulk (Order of the Realm), became the title of his position "Nizam of Hyderabad". By the end of his rule, the Nizam had become independent from the Mughals, and had founded the Asaf Jahi dynasty.

Following the decline of the Mughal power, the region of Deccan saw the rise of the Maratha Empire. The Nizam himself saw many invasions by the Maratha Empire in the 1720s, which resulted in the Nizam paying a regular Chauth (tax) to the Marathas. The major battles fought between the Marathas and the Nizam include Palkhed, Rakshasbhuvan, and Kharda, all which the Nizam lost. Following the conquest of Deccan by Shahu I and the imposition of Chauth by him, Nizam remained a tributary of the Marathas for all intent and purposes and hence, Hyderabad became a protectorate of the Maratha Empire.

In 1763, the Nizam shifted the capital to the city of Hyderabad. From 1778, a British East India Company (EIC) resident and EIC soldiers were installed in his dominions. In 1795, the Nizam lost some of his territories to the Marathas, mainly Berar. The territorial gains of the Nizam from Mysore as a British ally were ceded to the East India Company to meet the cost of maintaining the EIC garrison. By 1818 following the overthrow of the Maratha Empire by the Company after the Third Anglo-Maratha War, the Maratha protection of Hyderabad was quickly replaced by the Company's subsidiary alliance and thereby, the Peshwa, who maintained all the suzerinial lands, was deposed from his suzerainty from Hyderabad and was replaced with a viceroy.

=== British suzerainty ===
In 1768, the Nizam signed the Treaty of Masulipatanam ceding the Northern Circars to British. Later in 1779, the Nizams along with Marathas and Hyder Ali Mysore came together and formed an alliance against the British. This resulted in the British defeating the alliance and subsequently the Nizam in 1788 had to cede Guntur to the British. Subsequently the Nizams had to sign various treaties, the most important of this was the signing of Treaty of Subsidiary Alliance under which Nizams had ceded most of the power to the British. Gradually the entire coastal areas were lost to the British and Hyderabad became a landlocked kingdom.

In 1798, Nizam ʿĀlī Khan (Asaf Jah II) was forced to enter into an agreement that put Hyderabad under British protection. He was the first Indian prince to sign such an agreement. (Consequently, the ruler of Hyderabad rated a 23-gun salute during the period of British India.) The British Indian government retained the right to intervene in case of misrule.

Hyderabad under Asaf Jah II was a British ally in the second and third Maratha Wars (1803–05, 1817–19), Anglo-Mysore wars, and would remain loyal to the British during the Indian Rebellion of 1857 (1857–58).

His son, Asaf Jah III Mir Akbar Ali Khan (known as Sikandar Jah) ruled from 1803 to 1829. During his rule, a British cantonment was built in Hyderabad and the area was named in his honour, Secunderabad. The British Residency at Koti was also built during his reign by the then British Resident James Achilles Kirkpatrick.

Sikander Jah was succeeded by Asaf Jah IV, who ruled from 1829 to 1857 and was succeeded by his son Asaf Jah V.

==== Asaf Jah V ====
Asaf Jah V's reign from 1857 to 1869 was marked by reforms by his Prime Minister Salar Jung I. Before this time, there was no regular or systematic form of administration, and the duties were in the hands of the Diwan (Prime Minister), and corruption was thus widespread.

In 1867, the State was divided into five divisions and seventeen districts, and subedars (governors) were appointed for the five Divisions and talukdars and tehsildars for the districts. The judicial, public works, medical, educational, municipal, and police departments were re-organised. In 1868, sadr-i-mahrams (Assistant Ministers) were appointed for the Judicial, Revenue, Police, and Miscellaneous Departments.

Later on, Asaf Jah VI succeeded the position.

==== Asaf Jah VI ====
Asaf Jah VI Mir Mahbub Ali Khan became the Nizam at the age of three years. His regents were Salar Jung I and Shams-ul-Umra III and later on Asman Jah and Viqar-ul-Umra. He assumed full rule at the age of 17 and ruled until he died in 1911. His reign saw the official language of Hyderabad State shift from Persian to Urdu, a change implemented in the 1880s during the short tenure of Prime Minister Salar Jung II.

The Nizam's Guaranteed State Railway was established during his reign to connect Hyderabad State to the rest of British India. It was headquartered at Secunderabad Railway Station. The railway marked the beginning of industry in Hyderabad, and factories were built in Hyderabad city.

During his rule, the Great Musi Flood of 1908 struck the city of Hyderabad, which killed an estimated 50,000 people. The Nizam opened all his palaces for public asylum.

He also abolished Sati where women used to jump into their husband's burning pyre, by issuing a royal firman.

==== Asaf Jah VII ====
The last Nizam of Hyderabad Mir Osman Ali Khan ruled the state from 1911 until 1948. He was given the title "Faithful Ally of the British Empire". After Operation Polo, he continued to rule the state until January 1950, but in name only.

The Nizam established the Hyderabad State Bank. Hyderabad was the only independent state in the Indian subcontinent that had its own currency, the Hyderabadi rupee. The Begumpet Airport was established in the 1930s with formation of Hyderabad Aero Club by the Nizam. Initially, it was used as a domestic and international airport for Nizam's Deccan Airways, the earliest airline in British India. The terminal building was created in 1937.

To prevent another great flood, the Nizam also constructed two lakes, namely the Osman Sagar and Himayath Sagar. The Osmania General Hospital, Jubilee Hall, State Library (then known as Asifia Kutubkhana) and Public Gardens (then known as Bagh e Aam) were constructed during this period.

=== After Indian Independence (1947–1948) ===
In 1947 India gained independence and Pakistan came into existence. The British left the local rulers of the princely states the choice of whether to join one or the other or to remain independent. On 11 June 1947, the Nizam issued a declaration to the effect that he had decided not to participate in the Constituent Assembly of either Pakistan or India.

However, the Nizams were Muslim ruling over a predominantly Hindu population. India insisted that the great majority of residents wanted to join India.

The Nizam was in a weak position as his army numbered only 24,000 men, of whom only some 6,000 were fully trained and equipped.

On 21 August 1948, the Secretary-General of the Hyderabad Department of External Affairs requested the President of the United Nations Security Council, under Article 35(2) of the United Nations Charter, to consider the "grave dispute, which, unless settled by international law and justice, is likely to endanger the maintenance of international peace and security".

On 4 September the Prime Minister of Hyderabad Mir Laiq Ali announced to the Hyderabad Assembly that a delegation was about to leave for Lake Success, headed by Moin Nawaz Jung. The Nizam also appealed, without success, to the British Labour Government and to the King for assistance, to fulfil their obligations and promises to Hyderabad by "immediate intervention". Hyderabad only had the support of Winston Churchill and the British Conservatives.

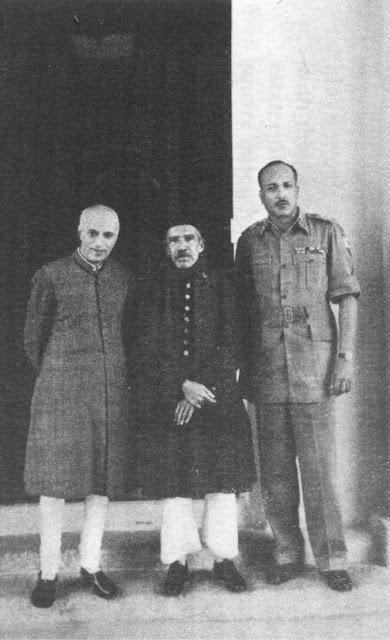
(From left to right): Prime Minister Jawaharlal Nehru, Nizam VII and army chief Jayanto Nath Chaudhuri after Hyderabad's accession to India

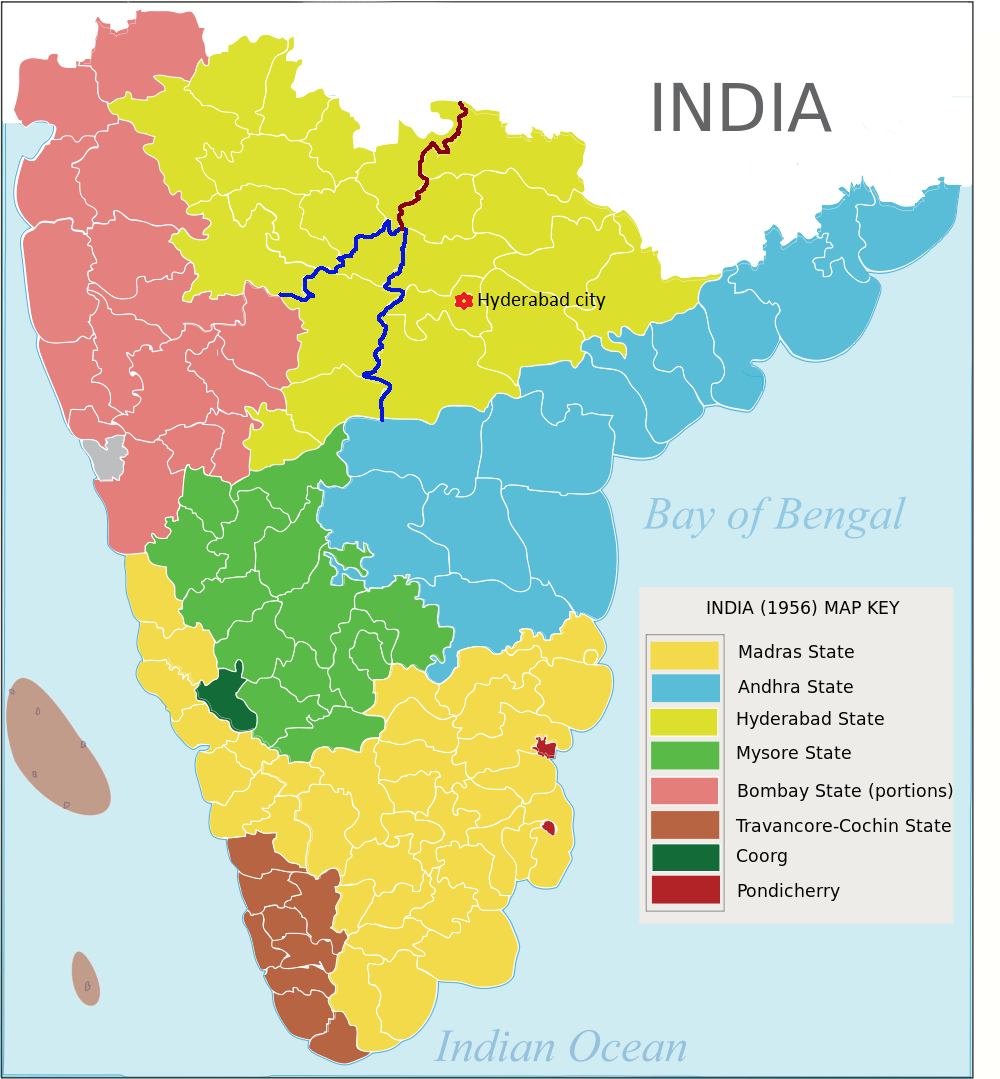
Hyderabad state in 1956 (in yellowish-green). After the reorganisation in 1956, Regions of the state west of Red and Blue lines merged with Bombay and Mysore states respectively and the rest of the state (Telangana) was merged with Andhra State to form the state of Andhra Pradesh.

At 4 a.m. on 13 September 1948, India's Hyderabad Campaign, code-named "Operation Polo" by the Indian Army, began. Indian troops invaded Hyderabad from all points of the compass. On 13 September 1948, the Secretary-General of the Hyderabad Department of External Affairs in a cablegram informed the United Nations Security Council that Hyderabad was being invaded by Indian forces and that hostilities had broken out. The Security Council took notice of it on 16 September in Paris. The representative of Hyderabad called for immediate action by the Security Council under Chapter VII of the United Nations Charter. The Hyderabad representative responded to India's excuse for the intervention by pointing out that the Stand-still Agreement between the two countries had expressly provided that nothing in it should give India the right to send in troops to assist in the maintenance of internal order.

At 5 p.m. on 17 September, the Nizam's army surrendered. The Government of Hyderabad resigned, and military governors and chief ministers were appointed by the Nizam at India's direction. The new military government was headed by Major General J. N. Chaudhuri who had led Operation Polo. A firman issued by the Nizam on 24 November 1949, accepted that the Indian Constitution applied to the State of Hyderabad.

The Nizam signed an Instrument of Accession to India on 25 January 1950. The next day, India became a Republic, and the Nizam was given the new title of Rajpramukh. India formally incorporated the state of Hyderabad into the Union of India and ended the rule of the Nizams.

=== Hyderabad State (1948–1956) ===
After the incorporation of Hyderabad State into India, M. K. Vellodi was appointed as Chief Minister of the state. The Rajpramukh now had little power and the administration of the state was with the help of bureaucrats from Madras state and Bombay state.

In the 1952 Legislative Assembly election, Burgula Ramakrishna Rao was elected Chief Minister of Hyderabad State. During this time there were violent agitations by some Telanganites to send back bureaucrats from Madras state, and to strictly implement 'Mulki-rules' (local jobs for locals only), which was part of Hyderabad state law since 1919.

=== Dissolution ===
In 1956 during the reorganisation of the Indian States based along linguistic lines, the state of Hyderabad was split up among Andhra Pradesh and Bombay state (later Maharashtra) and Karnataka.

On 2 June 2014, the state of Telangana was formed splitting from the rest of Andhra Pradesh state and formed the 29th state of India, with Hyderabad as its capital.

== Government and politics ==
=== Government ===
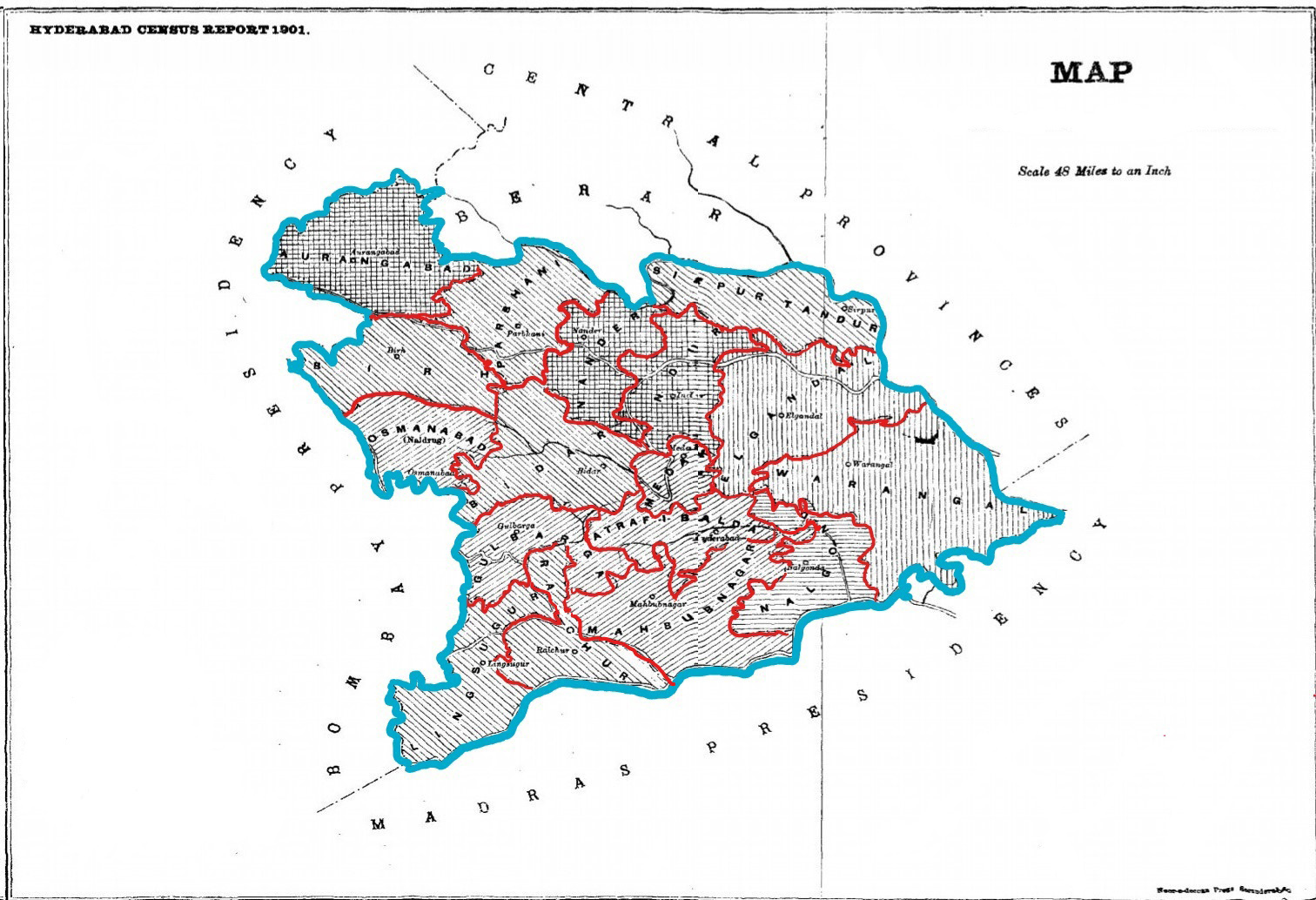
Hyderabad State 1901 with districts

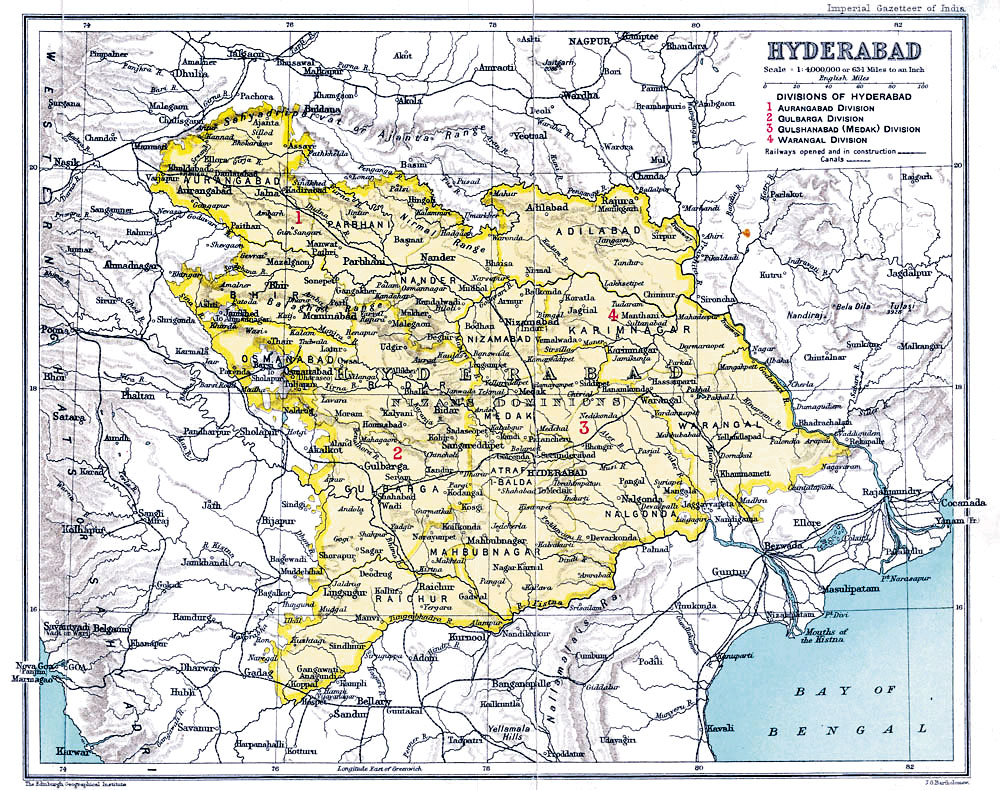
Hyderabad State in 1909 with divisions and new districts

Wilfred Cantwell Smith states that Hyderabad was an area where the political and social structure from medieval Muslim rule had been preserved more or less intact into modern times. The last Nizam was reputed to be the wealthiest man in the world. He was supported by an aristocracy of 1,100 feudal lords who owned a further 30% of the state's land, with some 4 million tenant farmers. The state also owned 50% or more of the capital in all the major enterprises, allowing the Nizam to earn further profits and control their affairs.

Next in the social structure were the administrative and official classes, comprising about 1,500 officials. A number of them were recruited from outside the state. The lower-level government employees were also predominantly Muslim. Effectively, the Muslims of Hyderabad represented an 'upper caste' of the social structure. (Note: However some Hindus served in high government posts such as Prime Minister of Hyderabad — Raja Ragunath Das, Vitthal Sundar Parshurami, Raja Sham Raj Rai Rayan, Maharaja Chandu Lal, Ram Baksh, Ganesh Rao, Maharaja Sir Kishen Pershad; Kotwal of Hyderabad (Venkatarama Reddy); and Raja Shamraj Rajwant Bahadur, member of H. E. H the Nizam's Executive Council.)

All power was vested in the Nizam. He ruled with the help of an Executive Council or Cabinet, established in 1893, whose members he was free to appoint and dismiss. The government of the Nizam recruited heavily from the North Indian Hindu Kayastha caste for administrative posts. There was also an Assembly, whose role was mostly advisory. More than half of its members were appointed by the Nizam and the rest were elected from a carefully limited franchise. There were representatives of Hindus, Parsis, Christians and Depressed Classes in the Assembly. Their influence was however limited due to their small numbers.

The state government also had a large number of outsiders (called non-mulkhis) – 46,800 of them in 1933, including all the members of the Nizam's Executive Council. Hindus and Muslims united in protesting against the practice which robbed the locals of government employment. The movement, however, fizzled out after the Hindu members raised the issue of 'responsible government', which was of no interest to the Muslim members and led to their resignation.

Various properties and wealth owned by the Nizam as part of Hyderabad State are now succeeded by his descendants, including his grandsons Prince Mukarram Jah, Prince Mufakkam Jah & Prince Shahmat Jah and his great-grandson Himayat Ali Mirza among others. Himayat Ali Mirza, great-grandson of the Nizam, remarked that his stake in the English state sums up to 36% of the total amount. For claiming the total share of £35 million, Nizam's great-grandson, Himayat Ali Mirza, reached the London High Court.

=== Political movements ===
Up to 1920, there was no political organisation of any kind in Hyderabad. In that year, following British pressure, the Nizam issued a firman appointing a special officer to investigate constitutional reforms. It was welcomed enthusiastically by a section of the populace, who formed the Hyderabad State Reforms Association. However, the Nizam and the Special Officer ignored all their demands for consultation. Meanwhile, the Nizam banned the Khilafat movement in the State as well as all political meetings and the entry of "political outsiders". Nevertheless, some political activity did take place and witnessed cooperation between Hindus and Muslims. The abolition of the Sultanate in Turkey and Gandhi's suspension of the Non-co-operation movement in British India ended this period of cooperation.

An organisation called Andhra Jana Sangham (later renamed Andhra Mahasabha) was formed in November 1921 and focused on educating the masses of Telangana in political awareness. With leading members such as Madapati Hanumantha Rao, Burgula Ramakrishna Rao and M. Narsing Rao, its activities included urging merchants to resist offering freebies to government officials and encouraging labourers to resist the system of begar (free labour requested at the behest of state). Alarmed by its activities, the Nizam passed a powerful gagging order in 1929, requiring all public meetings to obtain prior permission. But the organisation persisted by mobilising on social issues such as the protection of ryots, women's rights, abolition of the devadasi system and purdah, uplifting of Dalits etc. It turned to politics again in 1937, passing a resolution calling for responsible government. Soon afterwards, it split along the moderate–extremist lines. The Andhra Mahasabha's move towards politics also inspired similar movements in Marathwada and Karnataka in 1937, giving rise to the Maharashtra Parishad and Karnataka Parishad respectively.

== Military ==
Hyderabad's first ruler, Asaf Jah I (r. 1724–1748) was a talented commander and assembled a powerful army that allowed Hyderabad to become one of the preeminent states in southern India. After his death, the military was crippled by the succession wars of his sons. It was restored under Asaf Jah II (r. 1762–1803) who modernised the army. Notable units during his reign included British-trained battalions, the French-trained Corps Français de Raymond which was led by Michel Joachim Marie Raymond and fought under the French Tricolour, and the Victorious Battalion, an elite infantry unit entirely composed of women.

== Culture ==
=== Symbols ===
==== Coat of arms ====
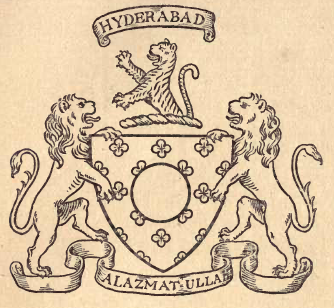
Coat of arms of Nizam of Hyderabad (1869–1911)

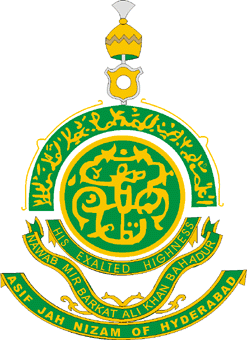
Coat of arms of Nizam of Hyderabad (1911–1947)

Coat of arms of Nizam of Hyderabad (1947–1948)

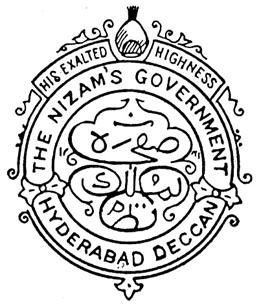
State Emblem of Hyderabad (1947–1948)

The coat of arms features the full titles of the Nizam at the bottom, and a dastar

==== Flag ====
Flag of State of Hyderabad (18th century–1900)

Flag of State of Hyderabad (1900–1947)

Flag of State of Hyderabad (1947–1948)

Under the leadership of Asaf Jah V the state changed its traditional heraldic flag. The Asafia flag of Hyderabad. The script along the top reads Al Azmatulillah meaning "All greatness is for God". The bottom script reads Ya Uthman which translates to "Oh Osman". The writing in the middle reads "Nizam-ul-Mulk Asaf Jah"

==== Anthem of Hyderabad State ====
The National Anthem of Nizam's Dominion, better known as "O Osman", was the national anthem of the Hyderabad State until its annexation by India. It was composed by John Frederick during the time of 7th Nizam Mir Osman Ali Khan and the lyrics are as follows.

May the creator bless the kingdom till eternity,
And O! Osman, keep you sound and healthy.
And make you live with dignity for a hundred years,
By the grace of God you are the pride of rulers.
May the Almighty keep your rule illustrious,
May God grant long life like khizr to your children.
And maintain the continuity of your noble descent,
May the proverbial Hatim’s charity pale before yours.
May your sense of justice surpass even that of Khusro,
and May your wellwishers glow like full-blown flowers.
And your enemies acknowledge your superior prowess,
O! Osman, make your tavern an abode of joy and ecstasy.

==== Stamps ====
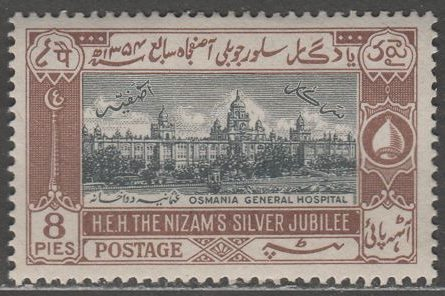
1937 Hyderabad State stamp featuring the Osmania General Hospital.

The stamps of the Hyderabad State featured the Golconda Fort, Ajanta Caves, and the Charminar.

==== Orders and decorations ====
The Hilal-i-Osmania, Tamgha-i-Khusrow-i-Deccan, and Tamgha-i-Asafia were orders and decorations conferred by the Nizam.

== Demographics ==
=== Mulki ===
Mulkis, or Mulkhis, are the native inhabitants of the erstwhile Hyderabad State, regardless of ethnic differences. The term was popularly used during the 1952 Mulkhi Agitation (Telangana), which saw protests demanding job reservations for Mulki people, and demanding non-Mulkis to leave.

Languages in Hyderabad State
1. Telugu (48.2%)
2. Marathi (26.4%)
3. Kannada (12.3%)
4. Urdu (10.3%)
5. Others (2.80%)

As per the 1941 Hyderabad State Census, 2,187,005 people spoke Urdu, 7,529,229 people spoke Telugu, 3,947,089 people spoke Marathi, 1,724,180 people spoke Kanarese (Kannada) as native languages. The Hyderabadi Muslim population, including the ruling Asaf Jahi dynasty numbered around 2,097,475 people, while Hindus numbered around 9,171,318 people.

== Architecture ==
The architecture of Hyderabad State is very cosmopolitan, and heavily influenced by European and Islamic styles. The Nizam's palaces and several public buildings were built in a distinctive style. The earliest surviving buildings are purely European, examples being the neoclassical British Residency (1798) and Falaknuma Palace (1893). In the early 20th century, the Osmania General Hospital City College, High Court, and Kacheguda Railway station were designed in the Indo-Saracenic style by Vincent Esch. The Moazzam Jahi Market was also built in a similar style.

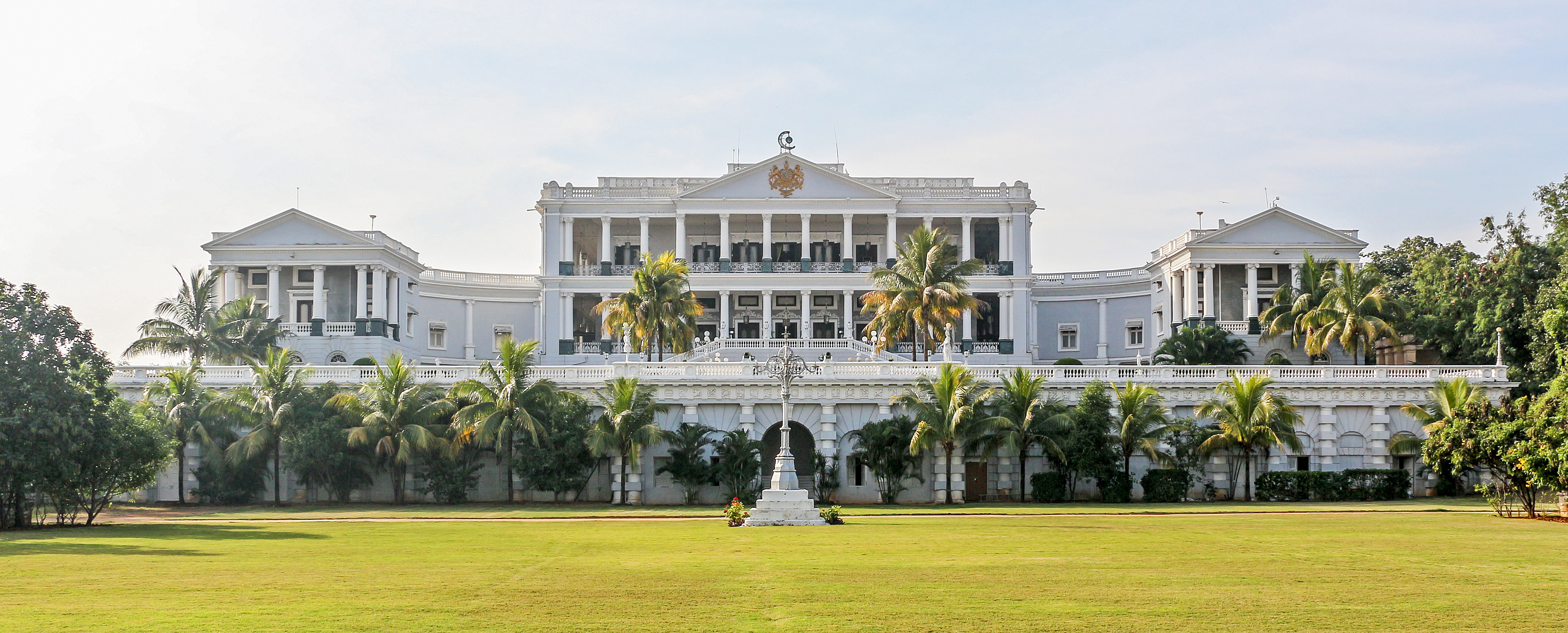
Falaknuma Palace

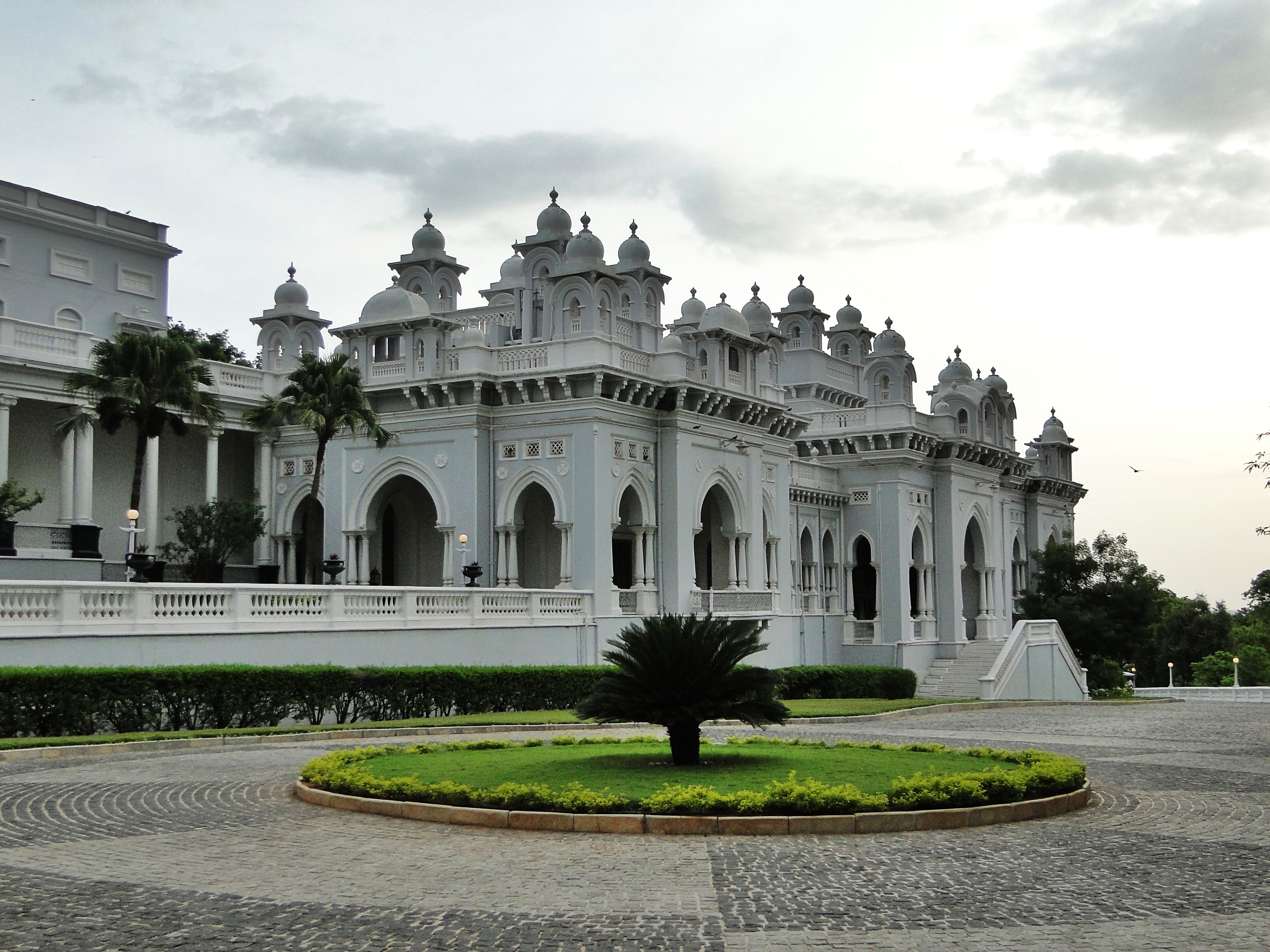
The entrance to the Palace

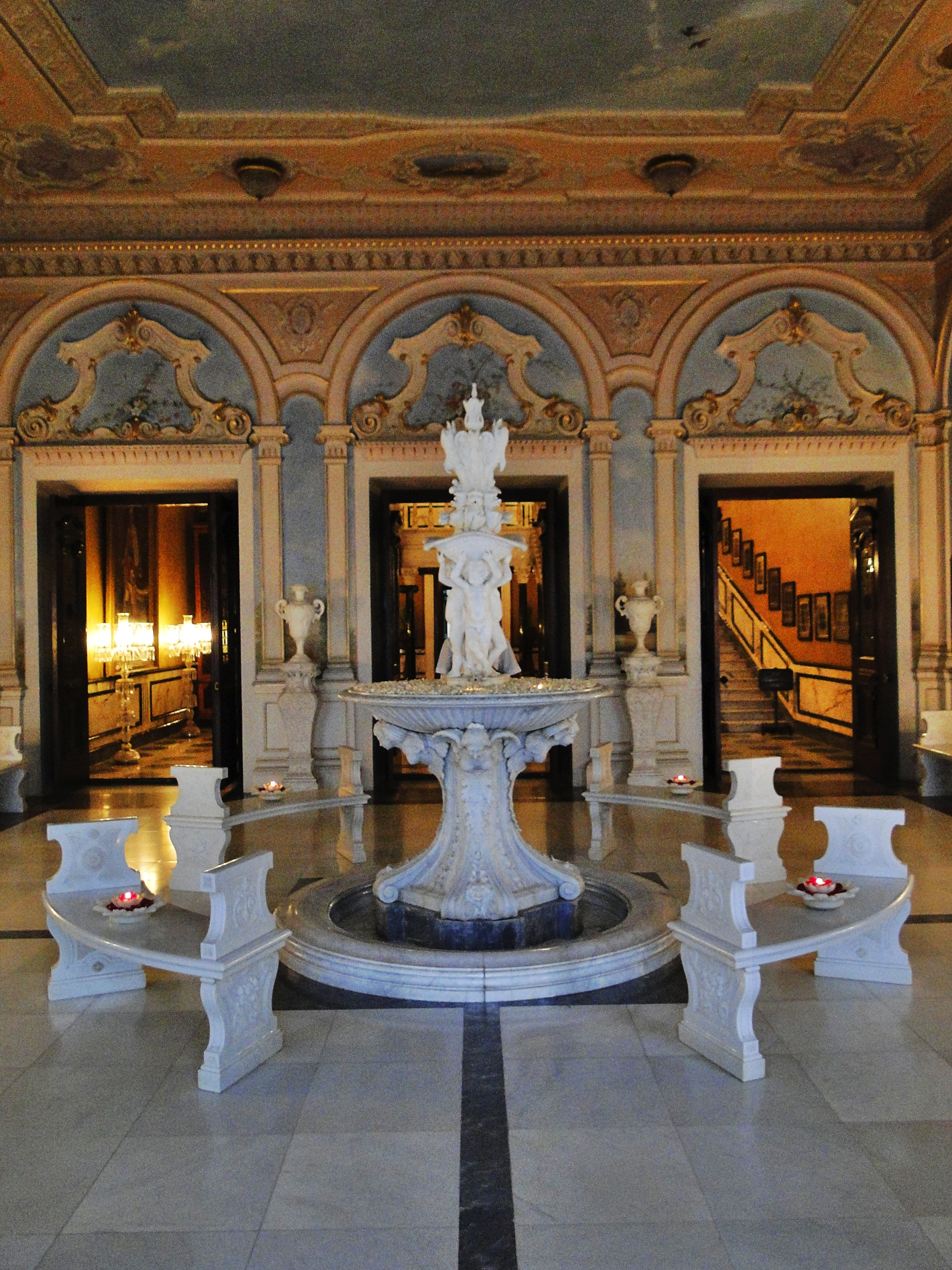
The reception room of the Falaknuma Palace

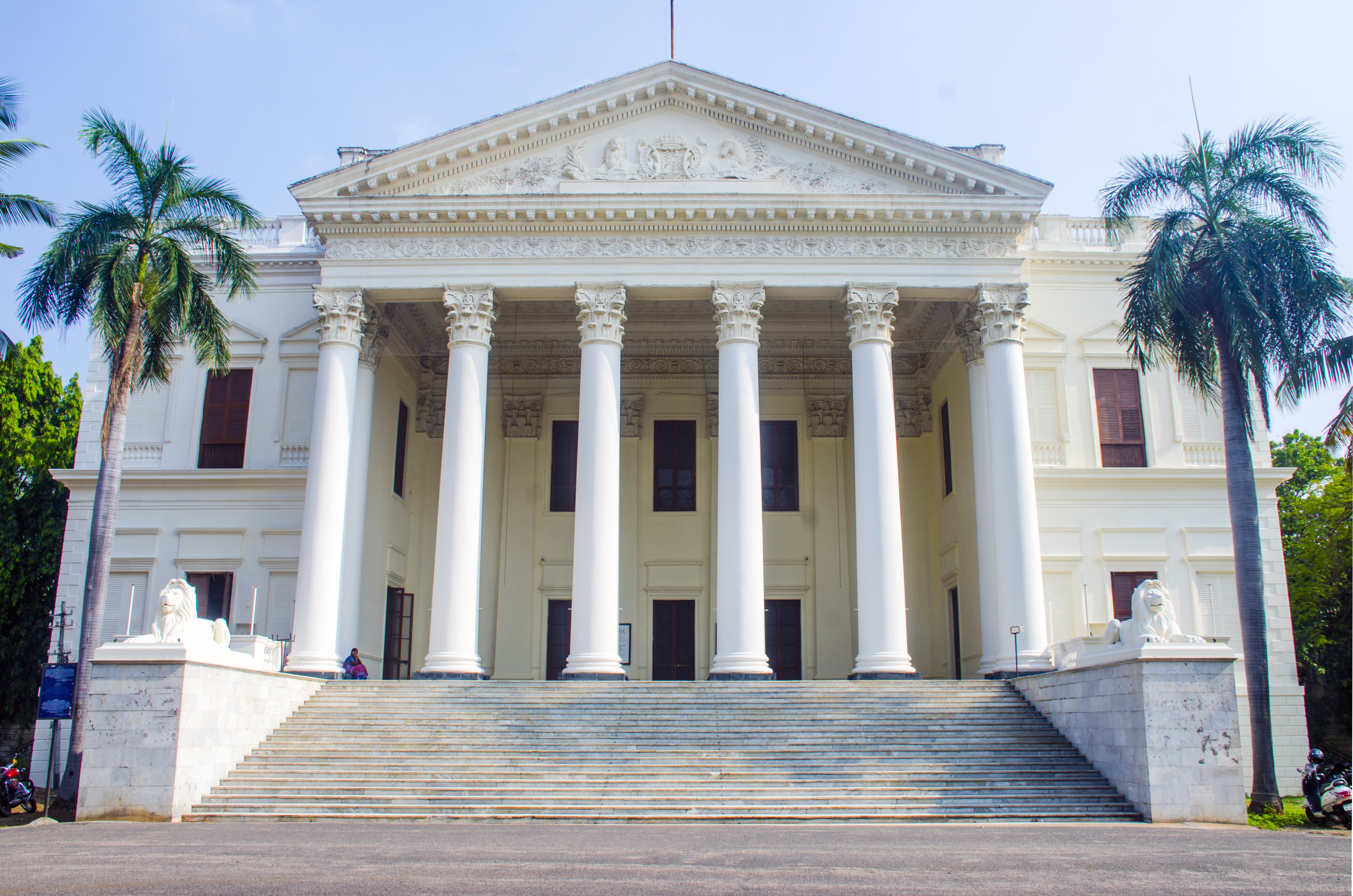
British Residency of Hyderabad

== Industries ==
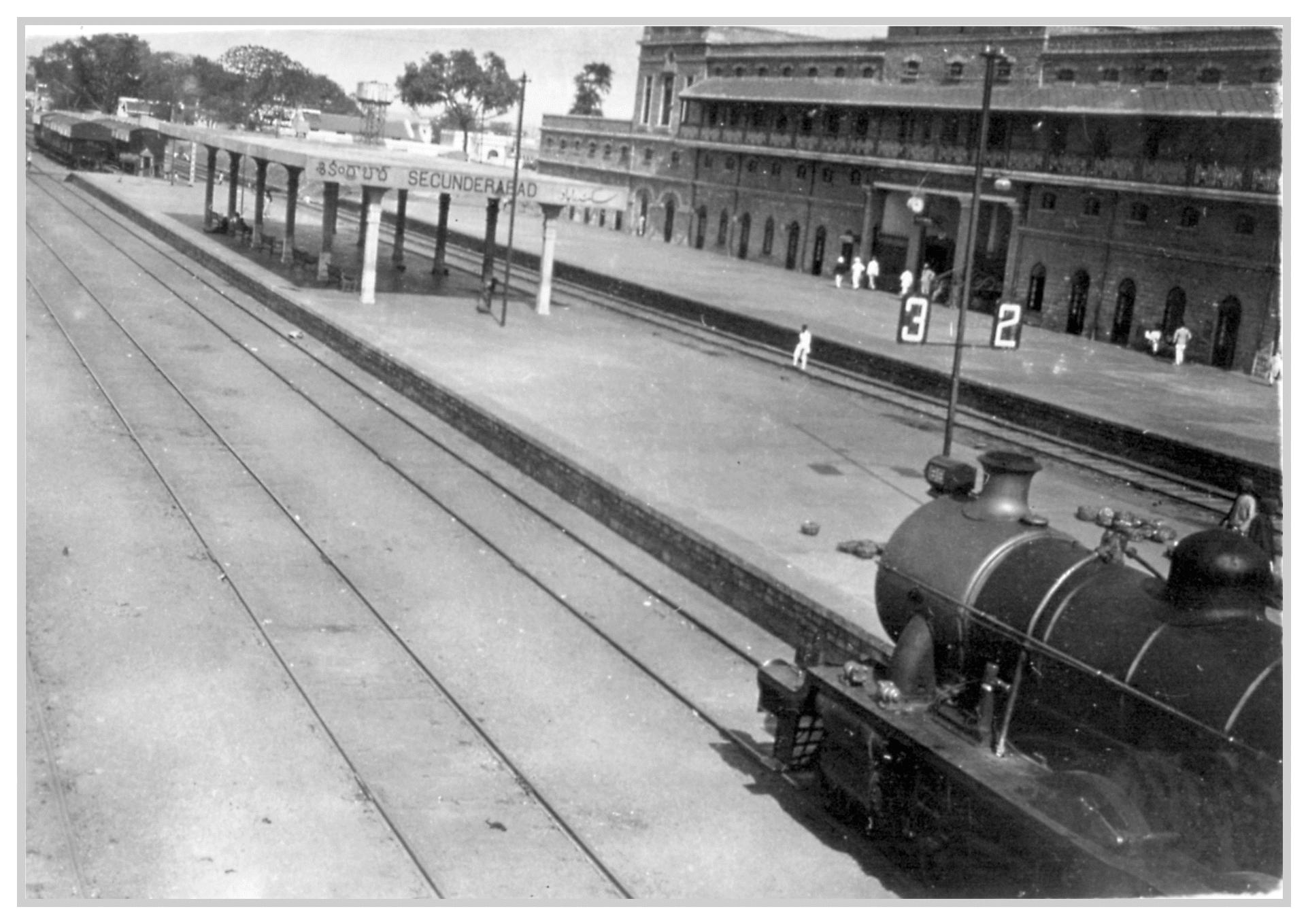
A locomotive at the Secunderabad Station (circa 1928)

Various major industries emerged in various parts of the State of Hyderabad before its incorporation into the Union of India, especially during the first half of the twentieth century. Hyderabad city had a separate power plant for electricity. However, the Nizams focused on industrial development in the region of Sanathnagar, housing several industries there with transportation facilities by both road and rail.

Industries in pre-Independence Hyderabad
Company	Year
Nizam's Guaranteed State Railway	1875
Karkhana Zinda Tilismat	1920
Singareni Collieries	1920
Hussain Sagar Thermal Power Station	1920
Hyderabad Deccan Cigarette Factory	1930
Vazir Sultan Tobacco Company, Charminar cigarette factory	1930
Azam Jahi Mills Warangal	1934
Nizam Sugar Factory	1937
Sirpur Paper Mills	1938
Allwyn Metal Works	1942
Praga Tools	1943
Deccan Airways Limited	1945
Hyderabad Asbestos	1946
Sirsilk	1946

== See also ==
- Hyderabad State (1948–1956)
- Regions of former Nizam's Dominion on linguistic basis:
  - Telangana
  - Marathwada
  - Kalyana-Karnataka
- Nizam of Hyderabad for a list of Nizams and other information
- Hyderabad State Forces, the armed forces of Hyderabad State
- Hyderabadi Muslim
- Hyderabadi Urdu, the local dialect of Urdu
- Dakhini
- Hyderabad, India, the Indian city that served as capital of Hyderabad State
- Hyderabad Police Action, the military invasion that resulted in the annexation of Hyderabad state into India
- Ganga-Jamuni tehzeeb
- Sawānih-i-Deccan
- Rajamundry Sarkar

== Bibliography ==
- Benichou, Lucien D. (2000), From Autocracy to Integration: Political Developments in Hyderabad State, 1938–1948, Orient Blackswan, ISBN 978-81-250-1847-6
- Beverley, Eric Lewis (2015), Hyderabad, British India, and the World, Cambridge University Press, ISBN 978-1-107-09119-1
- Chandra, Bipan; Mukherjee, Aditya; Mukherjee, Mridula (2008) [first published 1999], India Since Independence, Penguin Books India, ISBN 978-0-14-310409-4
- Faruqi, Munis D. (2013), "At Empire's End: The Nizam, Hyderabad and Eighteenth-century India", in Richard M. Eaton; Munis D. Faruqui; David Gilmartin; Sunil Kumar (eds.), Expanding Frontiers in South Asian and World History: Essays in Honour of John F. Richards, Cambridge University Press, pp. 1–38, ISBN 978-1-107-03428-0
- Noorani, A. G. (2014). The Destruction of Hyderabad. Hurst & Co. ISBN 978-1-84904-439-4.
- Guha, Ramachandra (2008), India after Gandhi: The History of the World's Largest Democracy, Pan Macmillan, ISBN 978-0-330-39611-0
- Smith, Wilfred Cantwell (January 1950), "Hyderabad: Muslim Tragedy", Middle East Journal, 4 (1): 27–51, JSTOR 4322137
- Ram Narayan Kumar (1 April 1997), The Sikh unrest and the Indian state: politics, personalities, and historical retrospective, University of Michigan, p. 99, ISBN 978-81-202-0453-9
- Jayanta Kumar Ray (2007), Aspects of India's International Relations, 1700 to 2000: South Asia and the World, Pearson Education India, p. 206, ISBN 978-81-317-0834-7
- Law, John (1914), Modern Hyderabad (Deccan), Thacker, Spink & Company, archived from the original on 25 June 2024
- Lynton, Harriet Ronken (1987), Days of the Beloved, Orient Blackswan, ISBN 978-0863112690
- Briggs, Henry George (1861), The Nizam, his history and relations with the British Government
- Dalrymple, William (2003) [1st pub. 2002]. White Mughals: love and betrayal in eighteenth-century India. Flamingo (HarperCollins). ISBN 978-0-14-200412-8.
