= Bhalerao =

Bhalerao (Marathi: भालेराव) is a Marathi surname. Notable people with the name include:

- Parth Bhalerao, Indian actor
- Renuka Das Bhalerao, Indian general, a member of noble Rai Rayan family and the prime minister of Hyderabad
- Shamraj Bhalerao, Indian member of noble Rai Rayan family and Public Works Department member of His Exalted Highness Nizam's Executive Council
- Rajaram Amrut Bhalerao, Indian doctor, professor, and patron of Marathi language theatre and Marathi literature.
