= Rajaram =

Rajaram or Raja Ram is an Indian name referring to the Hindu deity Rama, the raja (king) of Ayodhya.

== Given name ==
- Several Chhatrapatis, leaders of the Maratha Empire and princely states in India
  - Rajaram I (1670–1700), younger son of Maratha ruler Chhatrapati Shivaji, ruled 1689–1700
  - Rajaram II of Satara, putative grandson of Rajaram Chhatrapati, ruled 1749–1777
  - Rajaram I of Kolhapur (1850–1870), Raja of Kolhapur 1866–1870
  - Rajaram II of Kolhapur (1897–1940), Maharaja of Kolhapur 1922–1940
- Rajaram of Sinsini (ruled 1670–1688), Jat leader and organizer of rebellion against Aurangzeb
- Rajaram Amrut Bhalerao (1933–2020), Indian gastroenterologist
- Rajaram Girdharilal Dubey, Indian politician
- Rajaram Godase (born 1961), Indian politician
- R. B. Holle, Indian painter
- Rajaram Jain, author and linguist
- Rajaram Jaipuria, Indian industrialist
- Raja Ram Karki, Nepali politician
- Rajaram Kisan, Indian activist and politician
- Raja Ram Singh Kushwaha, Indian politician
- Rajaram Mane, Indian politician
- Rajaram Nimbalkar (born 1928), Indian politician
- Rajaram Nityananda, Indian physicist
- Rajaram Ozare, Indian politician
- Raja Ram Pal, Indian politician
- Raja Ram Pandey (1955–2013), Indian politician
- R. B. Patankar (1927–2004), critic and scholar
- Raja Ram Mohan Roy, a founder of the Brahmo Samaj, an Indian socio-religious reform movement
- Rajaram Sharma (born 1963), Indian artist
- Rajaram Shastri (1904–1991), Indian educator
- Rajaram Swaminathan, officer in the Indian Navy
- Rajaram Dattatraya Thakur (1923–1975), Indian film director
- Raja Ram Yadav, Indian physicist
- Rajaram (politician), Indian politician from Uttar Pradesh

== Surname ==
- Dhiraj Rajaram, Indian entrepreneur
- Laxman Rajaram (born 1983), Indian chess grandmaster
- Madhurantakam Rajaram (1930–1999), Indian story writer
- N. S. Rajaram (1943–2019), author and mathematician
- Ramaswamy Rajaram, Indian Air Force air marshal
- Sanjaya Rajaram (1943–2021), Indian-born Mexican food scientist
- Suparna Rajaram, Indian psychologist

== Stage name ==
- Raja Ram (musician) (born Ronald Rothfield in 1941), musician and the owner of the UK record label TIP World

== See also ==
- Raja Ram Dayal Singh, Indian monarch
