= Rajaraman =

Rajaraman is an Indian surname and may refer to:

- P. V. Rajaraman, Indian civil servant, former managing director of India Cements
- Ramamurti Rajaraman (1939–2025), Indian theoretical physicist
- S. Rajaraman, Indian politician
- V Rajaraman, President of Institute of Chartered Accountants of India from 1980 to 1981
- Vaidyeswaran Rajaraman (born 1933), Indian engineer, academic and writer

== See also ==
- Rajaram (disambiguation)
