= Shamraj Bhalerao =

Indian noble

Raja Rai Rayan Shamraj Bhalerao Rajwant Bahadur
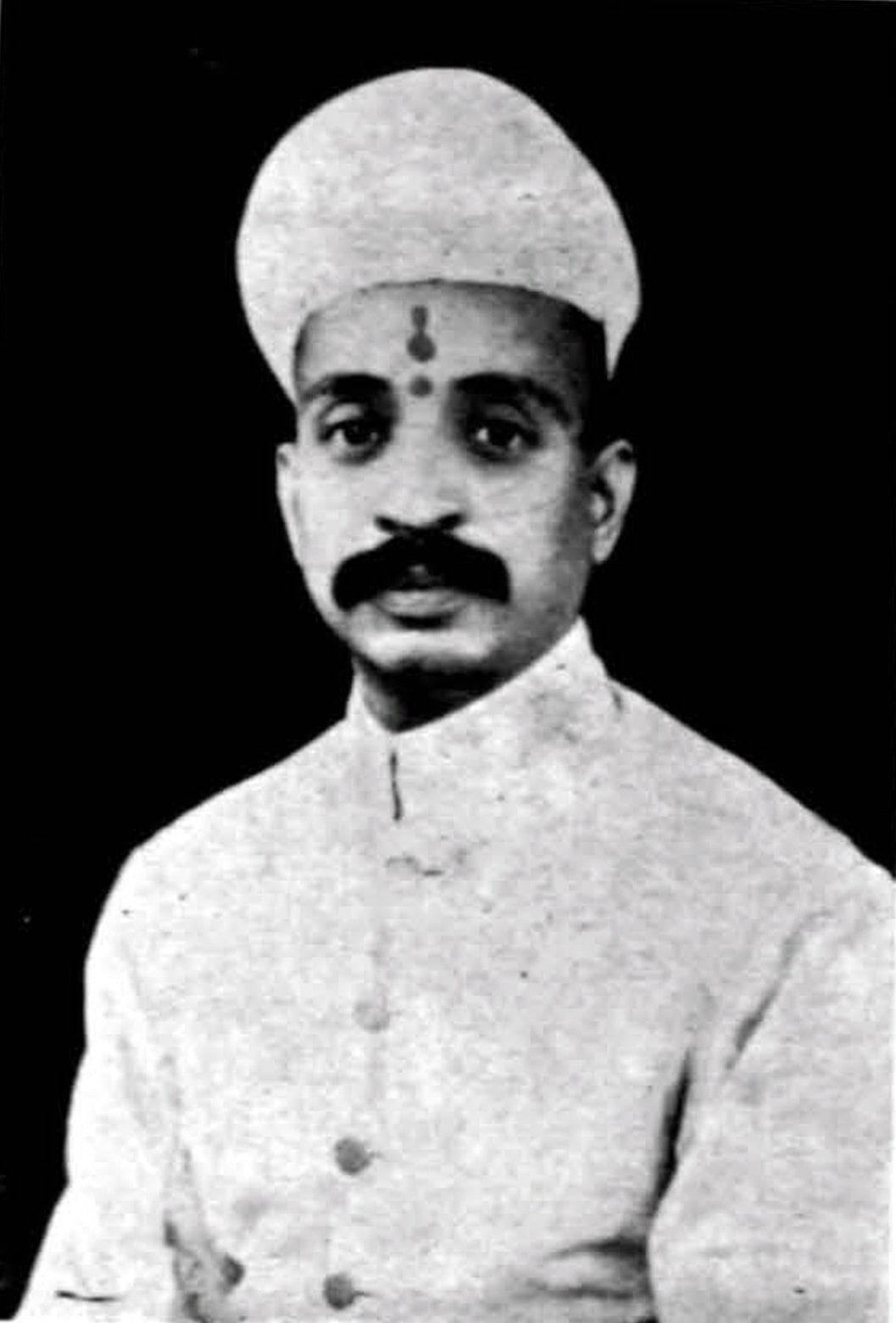

Raja of Rai Rayan Estate
- In office 1 July 1927 – 17 September 1948
- Monarch: Osman Ali Khan
- Preceded by: Raja Lakshmanraj Bahadur
- Succeeded by: Post Abolished

P. W. D Member of H. E. H the Nizam's Executive Council
- In office 1 June 1935 – 17 September 1948
- Monarch: Osman Ali Khan

Personal details
- Born: Shamraj Bhalerao; 15 August 1898 Hyderabad, Hyderabad State (present-day Telangana, India)
- Died: 10 June 1987 (aged 88) Hyderabad, Hyderabad State (present-day Telangana, India)
- Education: Nizam College

Sham Raj II (Note: Since his great grandfather is also famous with the same name, Raja Sham Raj, in order to avoid confusion his name is written as "Sham Raj II") (born as Shamraj Bhalerao), (also popularly referred as Raja Shamraj Rajwant Bahadur), (15 August 1898 – 10 June 1987), was an Indian noble who served as a member of H. E. H the Nizam's Executive Council. He was the first Hindu member in the executive council. Some of the ancestors of Sham Raj Bahadur were themselves peshkars (deputy ministers) and diwan (prime minister) to the Nizams and still earlier their family served at various points in their career to Shah Jahan, the Mughal Emperor. A member of the powerful Rai Rayan family, Sham Raj built a magnificent personal library inside his palace containing 45,000 rare books, which he later generously opened to public.

Born to a Hindu Brahmin family which traces its roots to Raja Krishnaji Pant, a watandar of Devagiri under Shah Jahan. Shamraj studied at Madrasa Aliya school and later in Nizam College. He was a childhood friend of the Nizam and was a staunch Nizam loyalist throughout his life.

Shamraj was a patron of arts, literature and music. Newspaper Editor of Bennett, Coleman & Company, Sir Francis Low says, "Raja Shamraj Rajwant is a lover of Art and Literature and his museum contains a valuable collection of Old Indian Paintings".

== Early life ==
Shamraj was born into a noble Rai Rayan family on 15 August 1898 to Raja Lakshmanraj Bahadur in Hyderabad. The Rai Rayan family belongs to Deshastha Rigvedi Brahmin community. The surname of Rai Rayan family is "Bhalerao".

=== Family history ===
His family is the founder of the Dafter-e-Diwani (Department of Finance) in Hyderabad Deccan during Nizam ul Mulk Asif Jah I. Sham Raj II's great-great-grandfather, Rai Naro Pant, migrated from Delhi to Hyderabad with Asaf Jah I. Rai Naro Pant served as 2nd peshkar (deputy minister) of Hyderabad Deccan after his elder brother Rai Moro Pant's death in 1750, who was the first peshkar (deputy minister) of Nizam of Hyderabad Deccan during the reign of Nizam-ul-Mulk, Asaf Jah I.

Sham Raj II's great grandfather's father Raja Dhondoji Pant was the elder son of Rai Naro Pant and served as third peshkar (deputy minister) during the reign of Sikandar Jah. His great grandfather Sham Raj I served as the Prime Minister of the Hyderabad from 1795 - 1797. The family is famously known as Rai Rayan Family in Hyderabad, India.

Sham Raj completed his schooling in Madrasa Aliya and his college degree in Nizam College.

== Reign ==
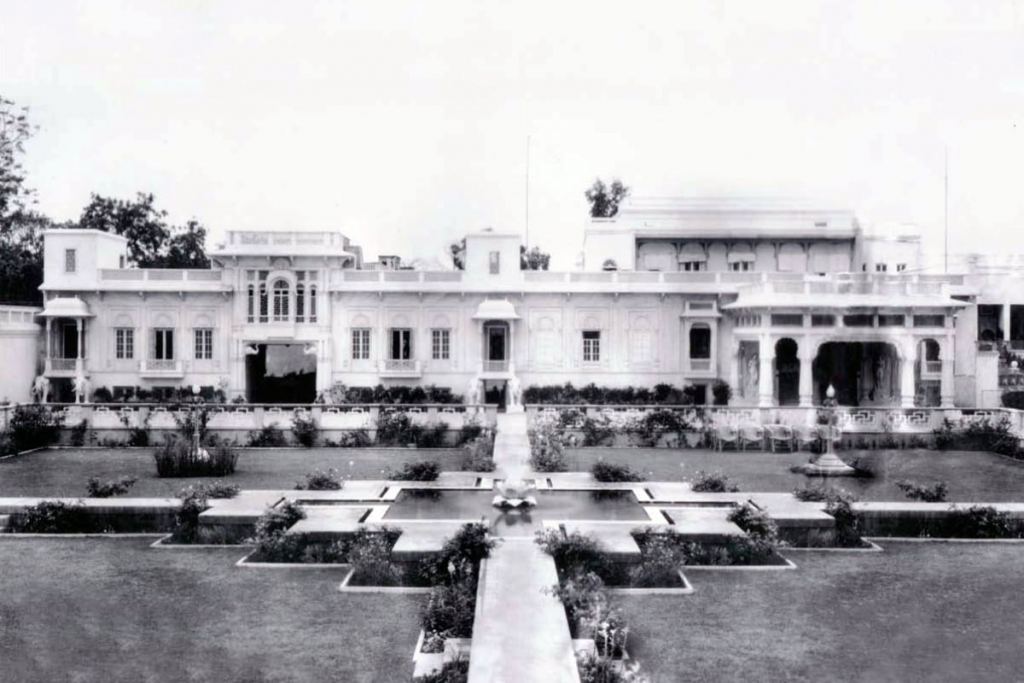
The Chandra Bhavan Palace (Rai Rayan devdi) in Hyderabad was built as the seat of the Rai Rayan rulers in 1757.

Quoting about the reign and the relationship between H. E. H the Nizam and Raja Shamraj Bahadur family, Author and former Mayor of Hyderabad city, K. Krishnaswamy Mudiraj in his book Pictorial Hyderabad, Vol. II says,

"Soon after getting the estates in his charge, by a firman (decree) of H. E. H the Nizam on the 1 July 1927, the young Raja cleared a large amount of arrears of office work and systematised it properly under his own supervision. He familiarised himself with the traditions of his illustrious father by studying old records and night and day he kept himself busy organizing his affairs on a satisfactory basis. With the welfare at his heart of his tenants he has provided Primary Schools and medical help in various places of his jagirs. He does his best to improve the conditions of his people and helps them in all possible ways in times of famine and pestilence. He gives concessions to tax-payers in times of epidemics and adversity and assists the poor at times of scarcity by giving them liberal wages for nominal work. Thus he has endeared himself to his subjects whom he constantly visits. Raja Sham Raj is a pattern of a thorough gentleman, keeping before him those great types of manhood depicted in the ancient scriptures of the country. His Exalted Highness continues to bestow the same personal interest on Raja Sham Raj Bahadur as the late Nizam showed for Raja Lakshman Raj and he often honours Raja Sham Raj and his brothers Raja Trimbakraj and Raja Dhundi Raj with gifts. On 28th April 1913 Raja Sham Raj received a feroja ring and a gold watch; while on 10 June 1929 all three brothers received a couple of rings each at the hands of H. E. H the Nizam".

During the reign of Sham Raj II, along with the hereditary Rai Rayan estate of worth around Rs.4,96,000, Sham Raj also held jagirs worth Rs.34,000,00.

== Titles ==
On the birthday of H. E. H the Nizam (Mir Osman Ali Khan) in 1930, he honoured Raja Shamraj Bahadur with the unique title of "Rajwant".
