= Renuka Das Bhalerao =

Prime Minister of the Hyderabad Deccan (reigned 1795–97)

Raja Rai Rayan Diyanatwanth Madar-ul-Maham (Chief of the Empire) Renuka Das Bhalerao Sham Raj Bahadur
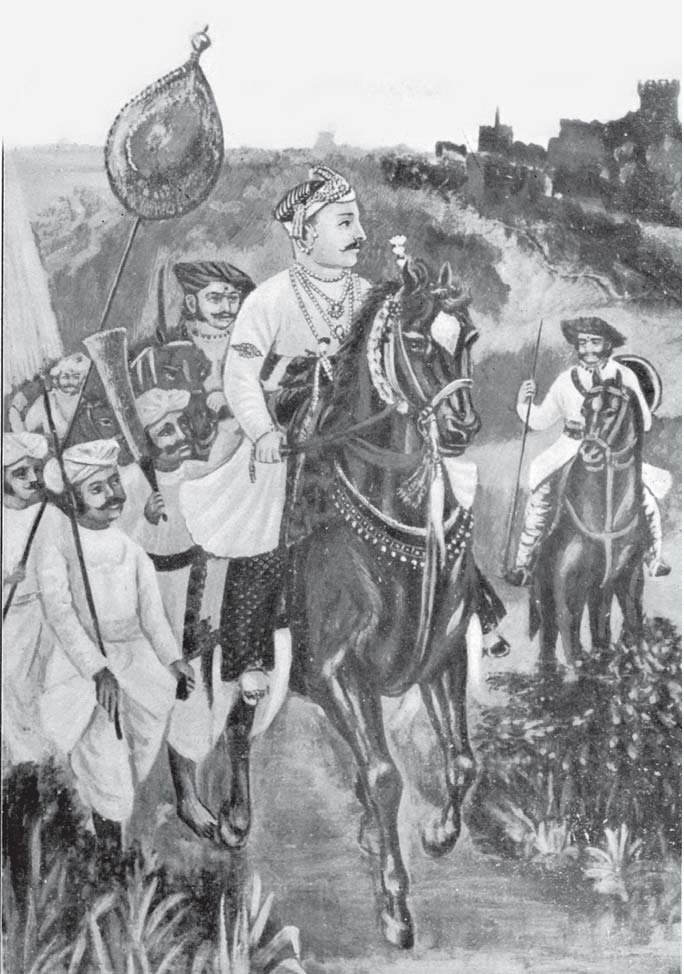

Prime Minister of the Hyderabad
- In office 1795–1797
- Monarch: Sikandar Jah
- Preceded by: Arastu Jah
- Succeeded by: Arastu Jah

Personal details
- Born: Renuka Das Bhalerao; 1 July 1765 Hyderabad, Hyderabad State, Maratha Empire (present-day Telangana, India)
- Died: 28 May 1822 (aged 56) Hyderabad, Hyderabad State, East India Company
- Children: Kishen Rao; Bhawani Shanker Rao; Lavraj Bhalerao ( great grand son) descendant
- Parent: Raja Dhondoji Pant (father)

Military service
- Battles/wars: Second Anglo-Mysore War; Third Anglo-Mysore War; Siege of Srirangapatnam; Fourth Anglo-Mysore War

Sham Raj I (Note: Since his great grandson is also famous with the same name, Raja Sham Raj, in order to avoid confusion his name is written as "Sham Raj I") (1 June 1765 – 28 May 1822); born as Renuka Das Bhalerao, popularly known as Raja Sham or Raja Rai Rayan, was a general, a statesman, and an Indian noble who served as Prime Minister of Hyderabad. He is also known as Raja Shan Rai Rayan Renuka Das.

Born to a Marathi Hindu Brahmin family which traces its roots to Raja Krishnaji Pant, Bhalerao studied under the patronage of the Nizam. He was a childhood friend of the Nizam and was a staunch Nizam loyalist throughout his life. In 1785 he was given the title of "Diyanatwanth" and a mansab, 2,000 cavalry, and jewelry. In 1786 he became the peshkar (deputy minister) of the state. Some years later, Nizam appointed him dewan (prime minister) of the state during the absence of Arastu Jah to Poona.

== Early life ==
Bhalerao was born on 1 June 1765 to Raja Dhondoji Pant (also known as Raja Dhundiraj Pant) in a Marathi family in Hyderabad. Bhalerao was a direct descendant of Krishnaji Pant, a Vatandar of Devagiri and a close aide of Mughal emperor Shah Jahan. Bhalerao's grandfather, Rai Naro Pant, migrated from Delhi to Hyderabad with Asaf Jah I. Rai Naro Pant served as the 2nd peshkar (deputy minister) of Hyderabad Deccan after his elder brother Rai Moro Pant's death in 1750, who was the first peshkar (deputy minister) of Nizam of Hyderabad Deccan during the reign of Nizam-ul-Mulk, Asaf Jah I. Bhalerao's father Dhondoji Pant was the elder son of Rai Naro Pant and served as third peshkar (deputy minister) during the reign of Sikandar Jah. They were Hindus of the Deshastha Rigvedi Brahmin sub-caste. His family is the founder of the Dafter-e-Diwani (Department of Finance) in Hyderabad Deccan during Nizam ul Mulk Asif Jah I. The later peshkar and member of H. E. H. Nizam's executive council, Raja Sham Raj II from 1933 to 1948, was his great-grandson. The family is famously known as the Rai Rayan Family in Hyderabad, India. The Rai Rayan family held zat mansabs of 5,000 to 7,000, with jagirs worth at least Rs.48,000 per year and also a fauj jagir worth Rs.478,552 during the reign of Sham Raj I.

Bhalerao learned martial arts, studied the Sanskrit language (because of his Hindu faith), and learned accounting (because he had the hereditary charge of the royal treasury). According to author and former Hyderabad mayor K.K. Mudiraj, Bhalerao was given the hereditary rights of his father on 5 December 1783.

== Career ==
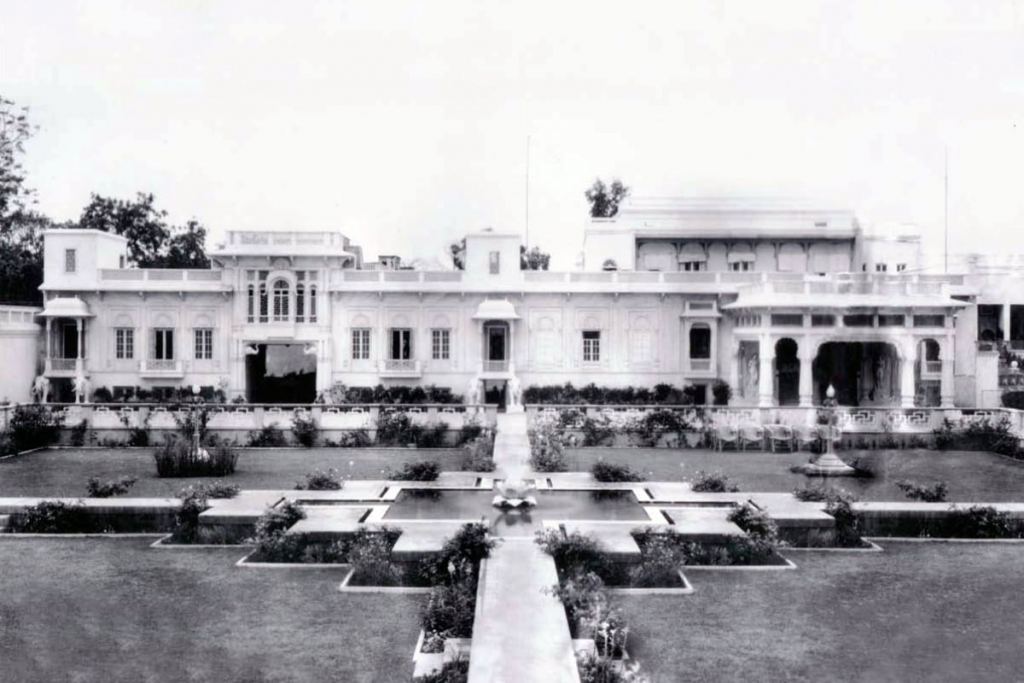
The Chandra Bhavan Palace (Rai Rayan devdi) in Hyderabad was built as the seat of the Rai Rayan rulers in 1757.

The Rai Rayan family are founders of Dafter-e-Diwani, a department of finance in the Hyderabad state They are hereditary dafterdars of half of the Nizam state, known as Western Subahs. After the death of Raja Dhondoji Pant in February 1783, his defterdarship of four hereditary western Subhas such the Carnatic, Bidar, Aurangabad and Khandesh were transferred to his elder son, Rai Omakant Rao. Rai Omakant Rao died in the same year as his father in August 1783. After the death of his elder brother Rai Omakant Rao, Bhalerao was given the hereditary rights of his father. According to author K. K. Mudiraj, Bhalerao was given the rights on 5 December 1783 with the title Raja Rayan. Author Mudiraj says, "In the 1784, along with four western subahs he was also given the maash and watan of Sirdeshpandgiri over all the suburbs of the Deccan and also Sirdeshpandgiri in the parganas of Medak, Gulbarga, Nanded and Sirdeshmukhi of Partabpur and many other jagirs". In 1786 he was appointed as the peshkar (deputy minister) of the state.

Bhalerao played a prominent role in the Second Anglo-Mysore War and Third Anglo-Mysore War against Hyder Ali and Tipu Sultan of Mysore on the side of the Marathas and British. In 1791–92, Sham Raj also led the forces of Nizam Ali Khan to the Siege of Seringapatam. Commenting on the influence of Bhalerao in the Second Anglo-Mysore War, Third Anglo-Mysore War and the Treaty of Seringapatam, author M. V. Shiva Prasad Rao says, Bhalerao "played a prominent part on behalf of the Nizam of Hyderabad in the war against Tipu Sultan of Mysore in 1781." In his correspondence there is a reference to the two sons of Tipu Sultan who were taken as hostages soon after the Third Mysore War (1790-1792) to compel the ruler of Mysore to fulfill the obligations arising out of the Treaty of Seringapatnam (1792)".

After the victory over the Tipu Sultan in 1792, Bhalerao was given the title "Raja Sham Raj" and many additional honors for his contribution in the war.

Later the Nizam tasked him to serve as dewan (prime minister) during the absence at Poona of Arastu Jah. Bhalerao held the post for two years from 1795 to 1797, when he stepped down and Jah resumed office.

== Titles ==
The following are the titles received by Renukadas:

- 1765-1780 - Rajkumar Renuka Das Dhundiraj Bhalerao
- 1780-1783 - Rai Renuka Das Dhundiraj Bhalerao
- 1783-1785 - Rai Rayan Renuka Das Dhundiraj Bhalerao
- 1785-1786 - Rai Rayan Diyanatwanth Renuka Das Dhundiraj Bhalerao
- 1786-1795 - Raja Rai Rayan Diyanatwanth Sham Raj Renuka Das Dhundiraj Bhalerao
- 1795-1822 - Meherban Madar-ul-Maham Raja Rai Rayan Diyanatwanth Sham Raj Renuka Das Dhundiraj Bhalerao Bahadur

== Religious and spiritual views ==
Religion and spirituality were very important to Sham Raj throughout his life. In fact, he made his own spiritual journey by visiting various hindu pilgrimages throughout his life. Author K. K. Mudiraj says, "Raja Sham Raj was of a religious turn of mind and, setting aside his honours, proceeded to Rameshwaram where he stayed for no less than six years.".

== Notes ==
Government offices
Preceded by Arastu Jah	Prime Minister of Hyderabad; 1795–1797	Succeeded by Arastu Jah
Preceded by Rai Omakant Rao Bahadur	Raja of Rai Rayan estate 1783–1822	Succeeded by Rai Appa Rao Bahadur
