= Arastu Jah =

Prime Minister of Hyderabad

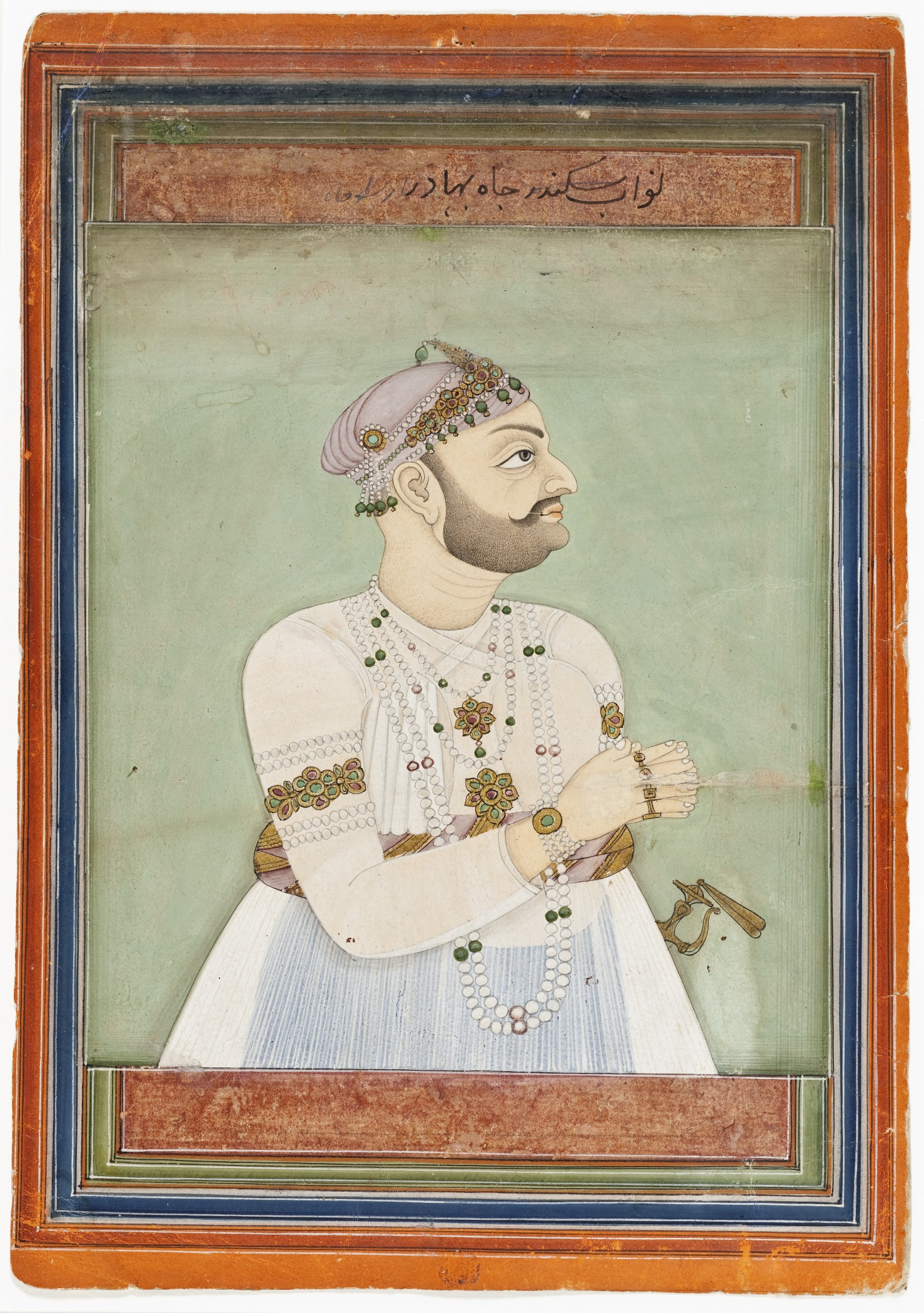
- Painting of Arastu Jah, c. 1810–1820

Prime Minister of Hyderabad
- In office 1778–1795
- Preceded by: Viqar-ud-Daula
- Succeeded by: Raja Shan Rai Rayan

Prime Minister of Hyderabad
- In office 1797–1804
- Preceded by: Raja Shan Rai Rayan
- Succeeded by: Raja Rajendra

Mu'inud-Daulah, Mushirul-Mulk, Azamul-Umara, Arastu Jah, a man of Persian descent, was the Diwan or the Prime Minister of Hyderabad during the reign of Nizam Ali Khan (Asaf Jah II) from 1778 until his death in 1804.

Nawab Azim Ul Umra Arastu Jah was the only person outside of the Nizam's family on whom the title Jah was conferred. He never failed in his respect to the Nizam nor presumed to act without first consulting his pleasure. Indeed, he sought to obtain his sanction for his every act in public life.

== Hostage of the Marathas ==
In the Battle of Kharda, which took place on 11 March 1795, Nizam being defeated by the Marathas, he was obliged to make a disastrous peace. He was forced to cede territories including Daulatabad, yielding an annual income of 15 lacs, and he pledged himself to liquidate the whole of the Marathas' claim amounting to 30 million rupees.

The prime minister was also handed over as a hostage to the Marathas and was confined in Poona until June 1797, when he succeeded in getting the treaty cancelled. The sudden termination of Arastu Jah's administration by captivity at the Maratha court deprived the government of the Nizam of the service of an able minister. The state of affairs until his return from captivity was very critical. Nizam Ali Khan tasked Raja Shan Rai Rayan to act as minister from the time Arastu Jah went to Poona until his return to Hyderabad in July 1797.

Nawab Arastu Jah, during his captivity in Poona, obtained much influence with the Marathas, so that before his return and reappointment as a minister, which took place in July 1797, he obtained the restoration of the territories ceded by the Nizam after the Battle of Kharda, the abandonment of claims from Chauth on Bida, the recession of the fort of Daulatabad and the extension of all the pecuniary claims on the part of the Maratha.

One of the first acts of Arastu Jah on his return to Hyderabad and reinstatement in the ministry was to induce the Nizam to allow prince Mir Akbar Ali Khan Sikander Jah, Asaf Jah III to sign all public documents and sanads.

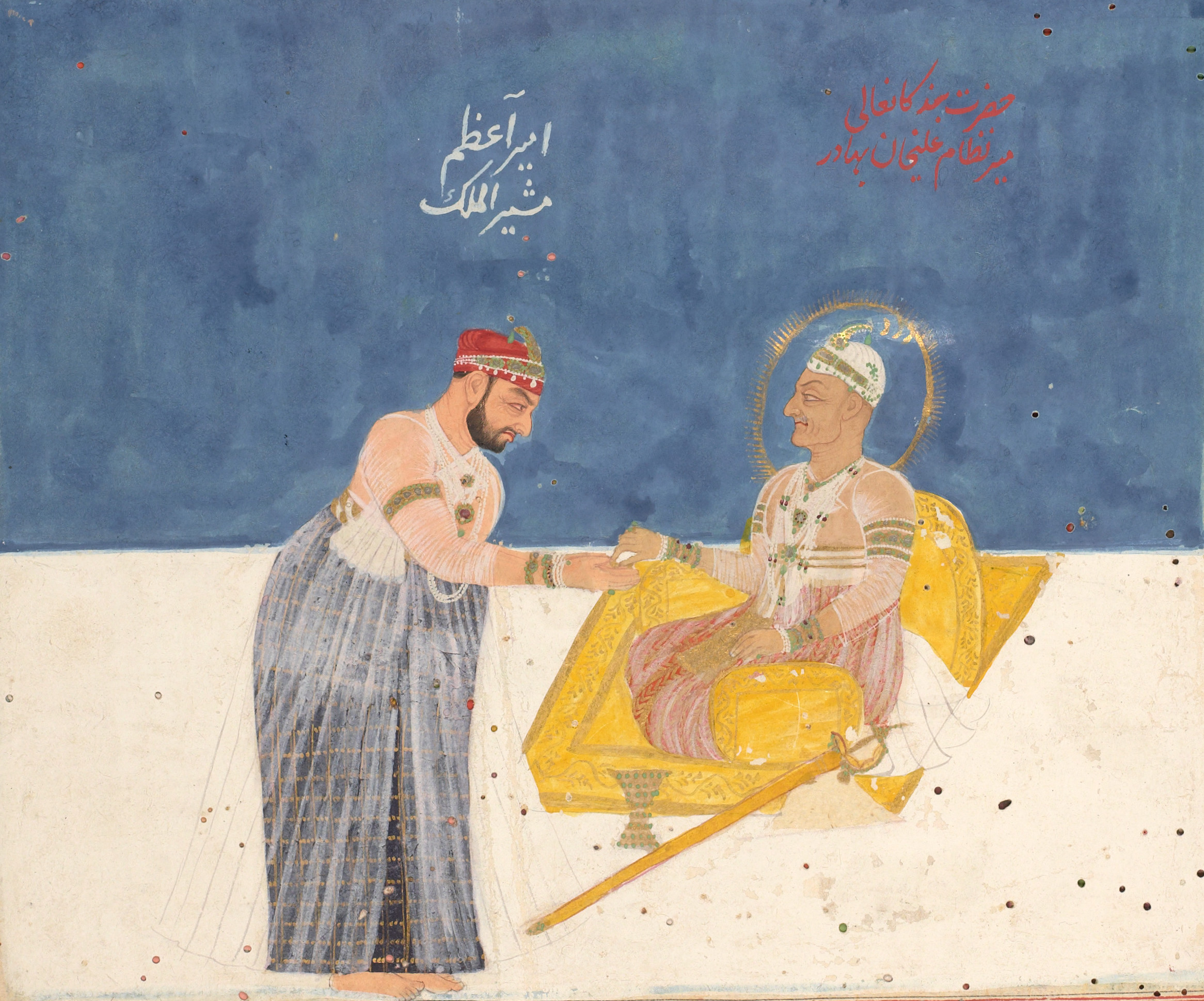
One of the final contemporary portraits of Arastu Jah (left), painted shortly before his death in 1804. He is shown in his official capacity as Diwan, attending to Nizam Ali Khan.

== Legacy ==
The locality Musheerabad is named after him. His tomb is a heritage site in danger.

In 1797, Safdar Ali Khan translated a Sanskrit language work, presumably Bhaskara II's Siddhanta Shiromani, into Persian as Zij-i Sarumani, dedicating it to Arastu Jah. The translation is now a lost work, and is known only from a mention in Khan's other work - Zij-i Safdari.
