= Nizam Palace =

Heritage building in Kolkata, India

Nizam Palace is a tier A heritage building on AJC Bose Road in Kolkata (formerly known as Calcutta), the capital of Indian state of West Bengal. It was constructed in 1933. Mir Osman Ali Khan, the 7th Nizam of Hyderabad, acquired it as his Kolkata residence from a businessman of Armenian descent, Johannes Carapie, also known as J. C. Galstaun (1859–1947). Its former guests included King Edward VIII. The palace was used as a hospital during World War I.

== History ==
Galstaun constructed this mansion as a labor of love for his wife and named it Galstaun Park. Later in 1933 it was sold to the Nizam of Hyderabad Mir Osman Ali Khan. The Nizam initially named it Saba Palace. Its name was later changed to Nizam Palace.
