= Rajaram (disambiguation) =

Rajaram is an Indian given name. It may also refer to:

- Rajarampur, a village in Uttar Pradesh, India
- Rajarampuri, a surburb of Kholhapur, Marahashtra, India
- Rajaram Maidan, a cricket stadium in Ichalkaranji, Maharashtra, India
- Rajaram College, Kolhapur, India
