= Nizam of Hyderabad =

Historic monarch of the Hyderabad State of India

Nizam-ul-Mulk of Hyderabad
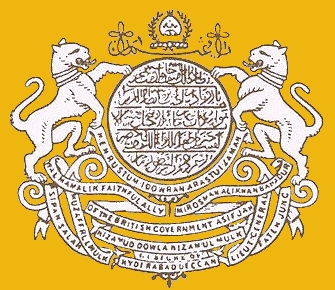
- Coat of arms of Hyderabad

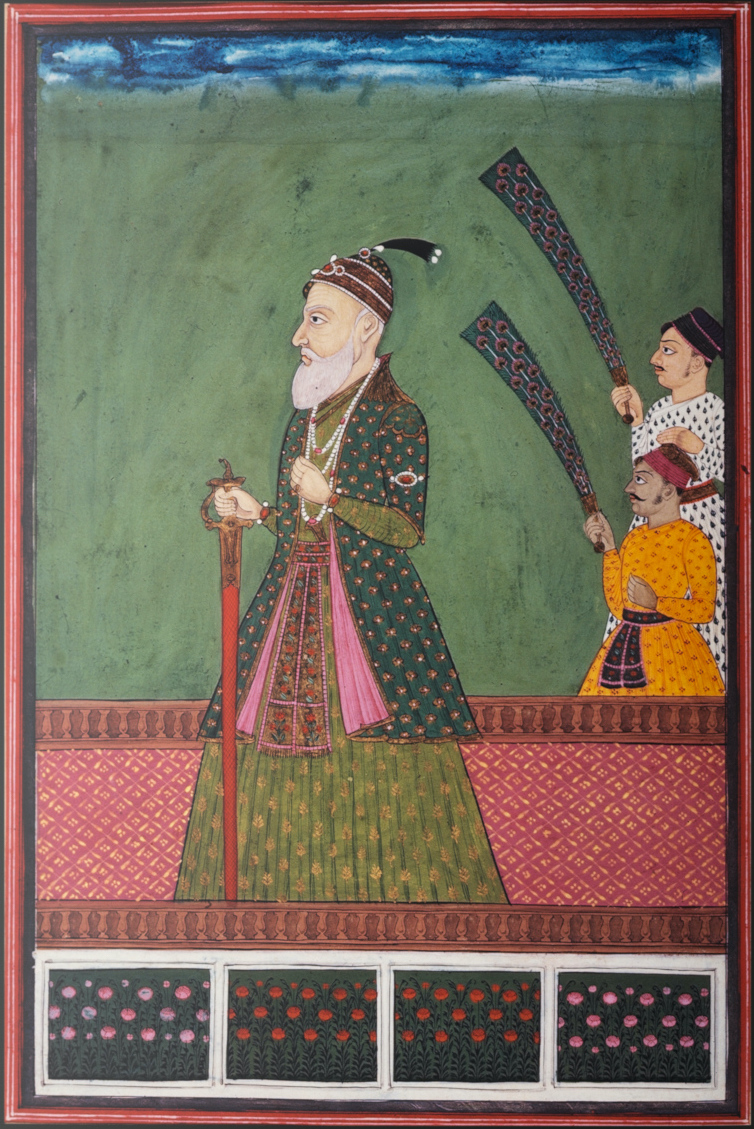
- First to reign Chin Qilich Khan; 31 July 1724 – 1 June 1748

Details
- Style: His Exalted Highness
- First monarch: Chin Qilich Khan
- Last monarch: Mir Osman Ali Khan
- Formed: 31 July 1724
- Abolished: 17 September 1948
- Residence: Chowmahalla Palace
- Appointer: Hereditary
- Pretender: Azmet Jah

Asafia flag of Hyderabad State. The script along the top reads Al Azmatulillah meaning "All greatness is for God". The bottom script reads Ya Uthman which translates to "Oh Osman". The writing in the middle reads "Nizam-ul-Mulk Asaf Jah", all written in Arabic.

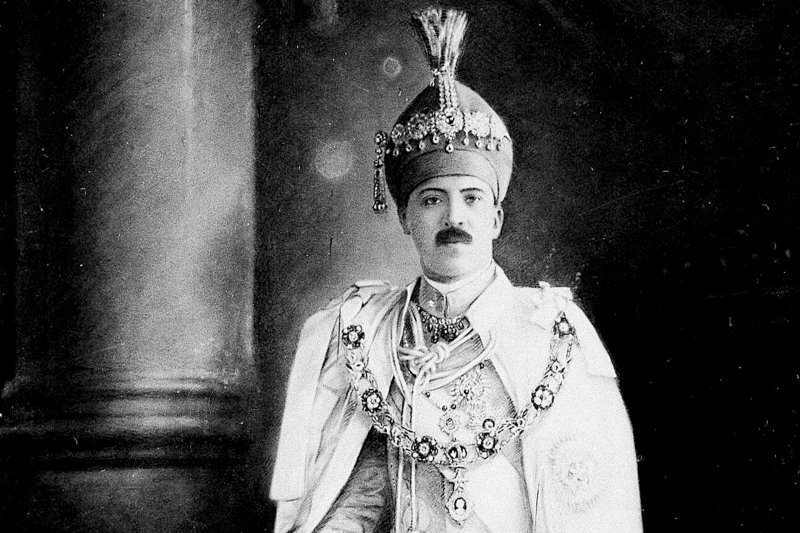
7th Nizam – Mir Osman Ali Khan

Nizam of Hyderabad was the title of the ruler of Hyderabad State (now part of the Indian state of Telangana, the Marathwada region of Maharashtra, and the Kalyana-Karnataka region of Karnataka). Nizam is a shortened form of Niẓām ul-Mulk (lit. 'Administrator of the Realm'), and was the title bestowed upon Asaf Jah I when he was appointed Viceroy of the Deccan by the Mughal emperor Farrukhsiyar. In addition to being the Mughal viceroy (Naib) of the Deccan, Asaf Jah I was also the premier courtier of the Mughal Empire until 1724, when he established an independent realm based in Hyderabad, but in practice, continued to recognise the nominal authority of the emperor.

The Asaf Jahi dynasty was founded by Chin Qilich Khan (Asaf Jah I), who served as a Naib of the Deccan sultanates under the Mughal Empire from 1713 to 1721. He intermittently ruled the region after Emperor Aurangzeb's death in 1707. In 1724 Mughal control weakened, and Asaf Jah became virtually independent. The titular Nizams fought with the Marathas since the 1720s, which resulted in the Nizam paying a regular tax (Chauth) to the Marathas. The Nizam later accepted British suzerainty after the defeat at Kharda and supported the British in its war against the Marathas.

When the British East India Company achieved paramountcy over the Indian subcontinent, they allowed the Nizams to continue to rule their princely states as client kings. The Nizams retained internal power over Hyderabad State until 17 September 1948, when Hyderabad was integrated into the new Indian Union.

The Asaf Jahi dynasty had only seven recognised rulers, but there was a period of 13 unstable years after the rule of the first Nizam when two of his sons, Nasir Jung and Salabath Jung, and his grandson, Muzafur Jung, ruled. They were never officially recognised as rulers. The seventh and last Nizam, Mir Osman Ali Khan, fell from power when India annexed Hyderabad State in 1948 in Operation Polo. Today, the title is held by his great grandson, pretender Azmet Jah.

== History ==
=== Etymology ===
The title Nizam comes from the Persian نظام /nɪˈzɑːm/, in turn derived from Arabic niẓām which means "order" or "arrangement", and was typically given to high ranking state officials.

=== Descent ===
According to Sir Roper Lethbridge in The Golden Book of India (1893), the Nizams are lineally descended from the First caliph Abu Bakr, the successor of the Islamic prophet Muhammed. The family of Nizams in India is descended from Abid Khan, a Persian from Samarkand, whose lineage is traced to Sufi Shihab-ud-Din Suhrawardi (1154–91) of Suhraward in Iran. In the early 1650s, on his way to hajj, Abid Khan stopped in Deccan, where the young prince Aurangzeb, then Governor of Deccan, cultivated him. Abid Khan returned to the service of Aurangzeb to fight in the succession wars of 1657–58. After Aurangzeb's enthronement, Abid Khan was richly rewarded and became Aurangzeb's favourite nobleman. His son Ghazi Uddin Khan was married to Safiya Khanum, the daughter of the former imperial Grand Vizier (prime minister) Sa'dullah Khan. Mir Qamaruddin Khan, the founder of the line of Nizams, was born of the couple, thus descending from two prominent families of the Mughal court.

Ghazi Uddin Khan rose to become a general of emperor Aurangzeb and played a vital role in conquering Bijapur and Golconda Sultanates of Southern India in 1686. He also played a key role in thwarting the rebellion by Prince Akbar and alleged rebellion by Prince Mu`azzam.

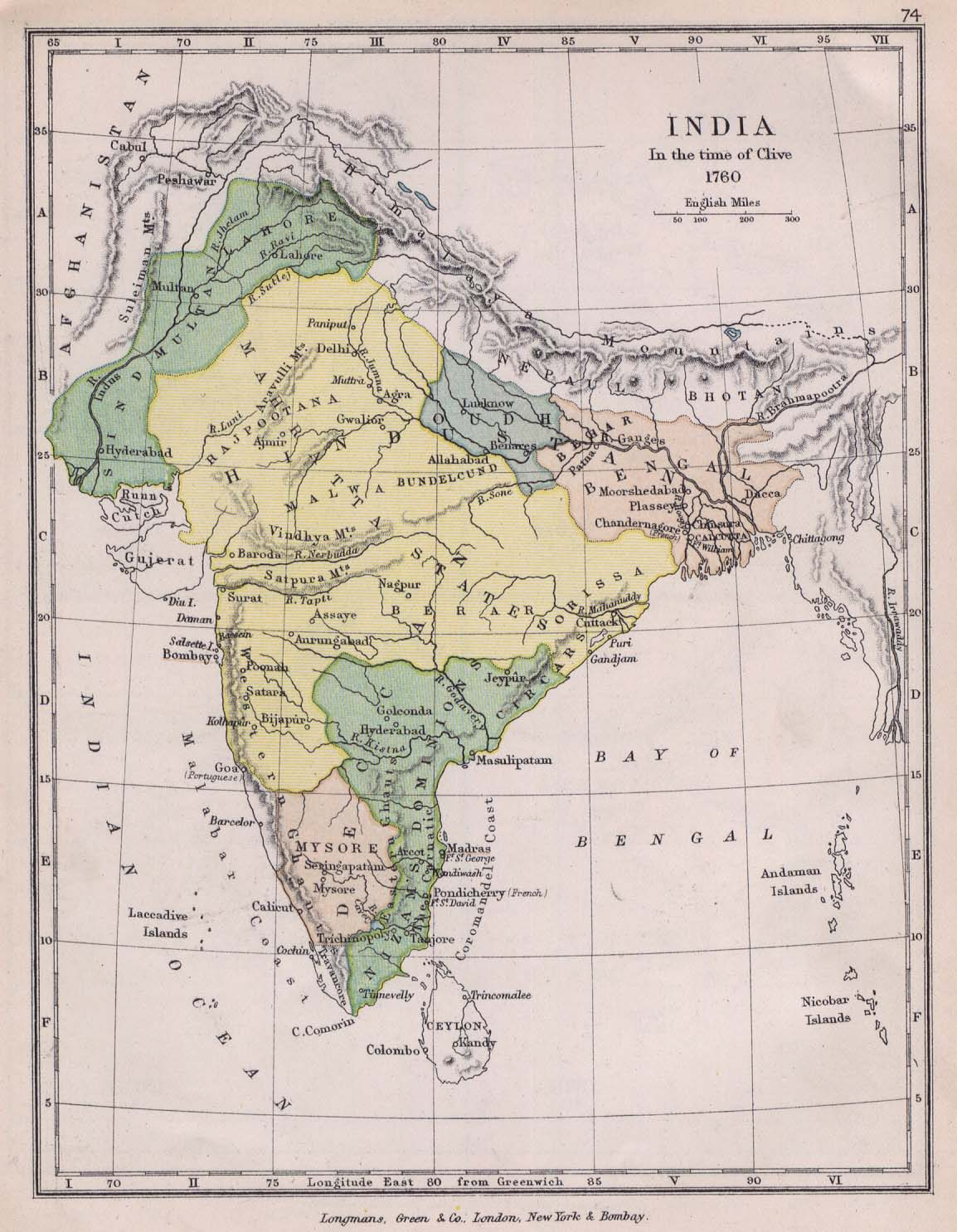
Map of India in 1760. Part of the southern area in green was ruled by the Nizam.

After Aurangzeb's death and during the war of succession, Qamaruddin and his father remained neutral thus escaping the risk of being on the losing side; they remained marginal players in the Mughal court during the reigns of Bahadur Shah I (1707–12) and Jahandar Shah (1712–13). Their successor Farrukhsiyar (1713–19) appointed Qamaruddin the governor of Deccan in 1713, awarding him the title Nizam-ul-Mulk. However, the governorship was taken away two years later and Qamaruddin withdrew to his estate in Moradabad. Under the next emperor, Muhammad Shah (1719–48), Qamaruddin accepted the governorship of Deccan for the second time in 1721. The next year, following the death of his uncle Muhammad Amin Khan, a power-broker in the Mughal Court, Qamaruddin returned to Delhi and was made the wazir (prime minister). According to historian Faruqui, his tenure as prime minister was undermined by his opponents and a rebellion in Deccan was engineered against him. In 1724, the Nizam returned to Deccan to reclaim his base, in the process making a transition to a semi-independent ruler.

=== Reign ===
In 1724, Asaf Jah I defeated Mubariz Khan to establish autonomy over the Deccan Suba, named the region Hyderabad Deccan, and started what came to be known as the Asaf Jahi dynasty. Subsequent rulers retained the title Nizam ul-Mulk and were referred to as Asaf Jahi Nizams, or Nizams of Hyderabad. Nizam I never formally declared independence from the Mughals; he still flew the Mughal flag, and was never crowned. In Friday prayers, the sermon would be conducted in the name of Aurangzeb, and this tradition continued until the end of Hyderabad State in 1948. The death of Asaf Jah I in 1748 resulted in a period of political unrest as his sons, backed by opportunistic neighbouring states and colonial foreign forces, contended for the throne. The accession of Asif Jah II, who reigned from 1762 to 1803, ended the instability. In 1768, he signed the treaty of Machilipatnam, surrendering the coastal region to the East India Company in return for a fixed annual rent.

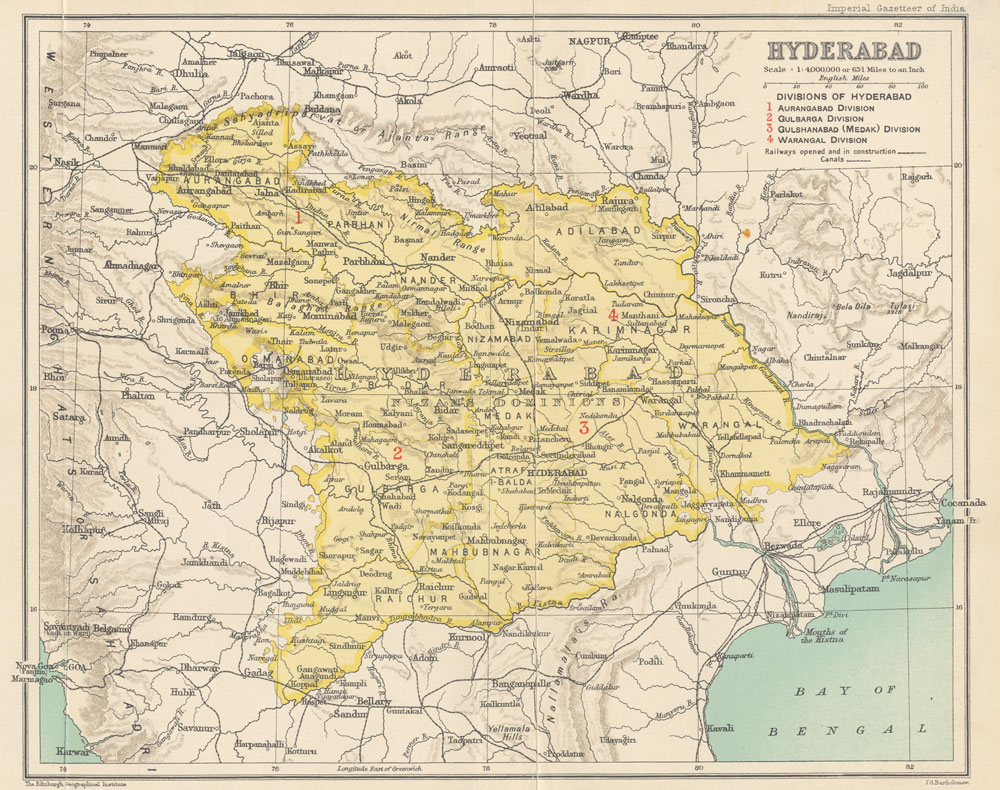
Hyderabad State in 1909

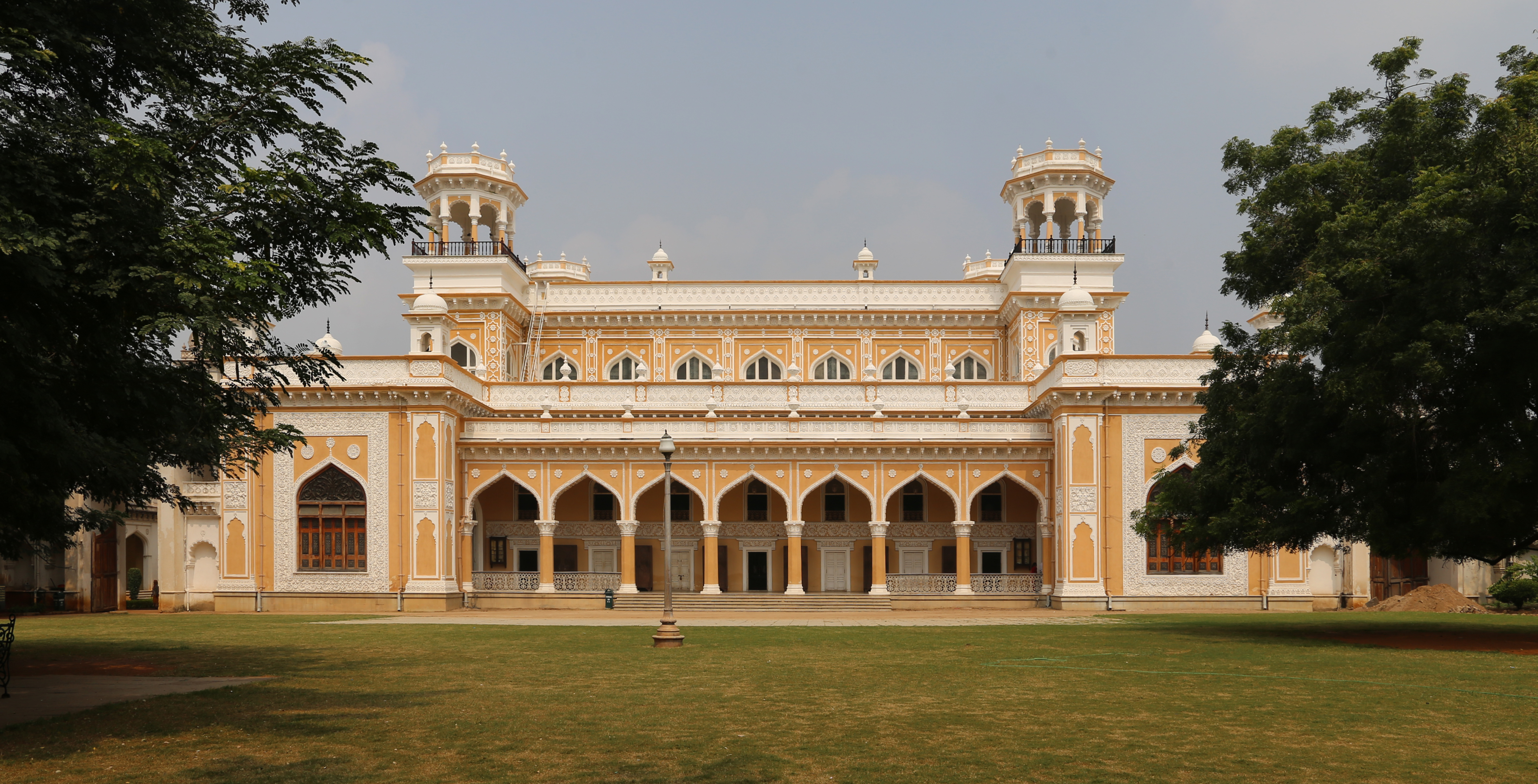
Chowmahalla Palace, official residence of the Nizams (1720-1948)

Following the decline of the Mughal power, the region of Deccan saw the rise of the Maratha Empire. The titular Nizams themselves fought during the Mughal-Maratha Wars since the 1720s, which resulted in the Nizam paying a regular tax (Chauth) to the Marathas. The major battles fought between the Marathas and the Nizam include Palkhed, Bhopal, Rakshasbhuvan, and Kharda, in all of which the Nizam lost. Following the conquest of Deccan by Bajirao I and the imposition of Chauth by him, the Nizam essentially remained a tributary of the Marathas.

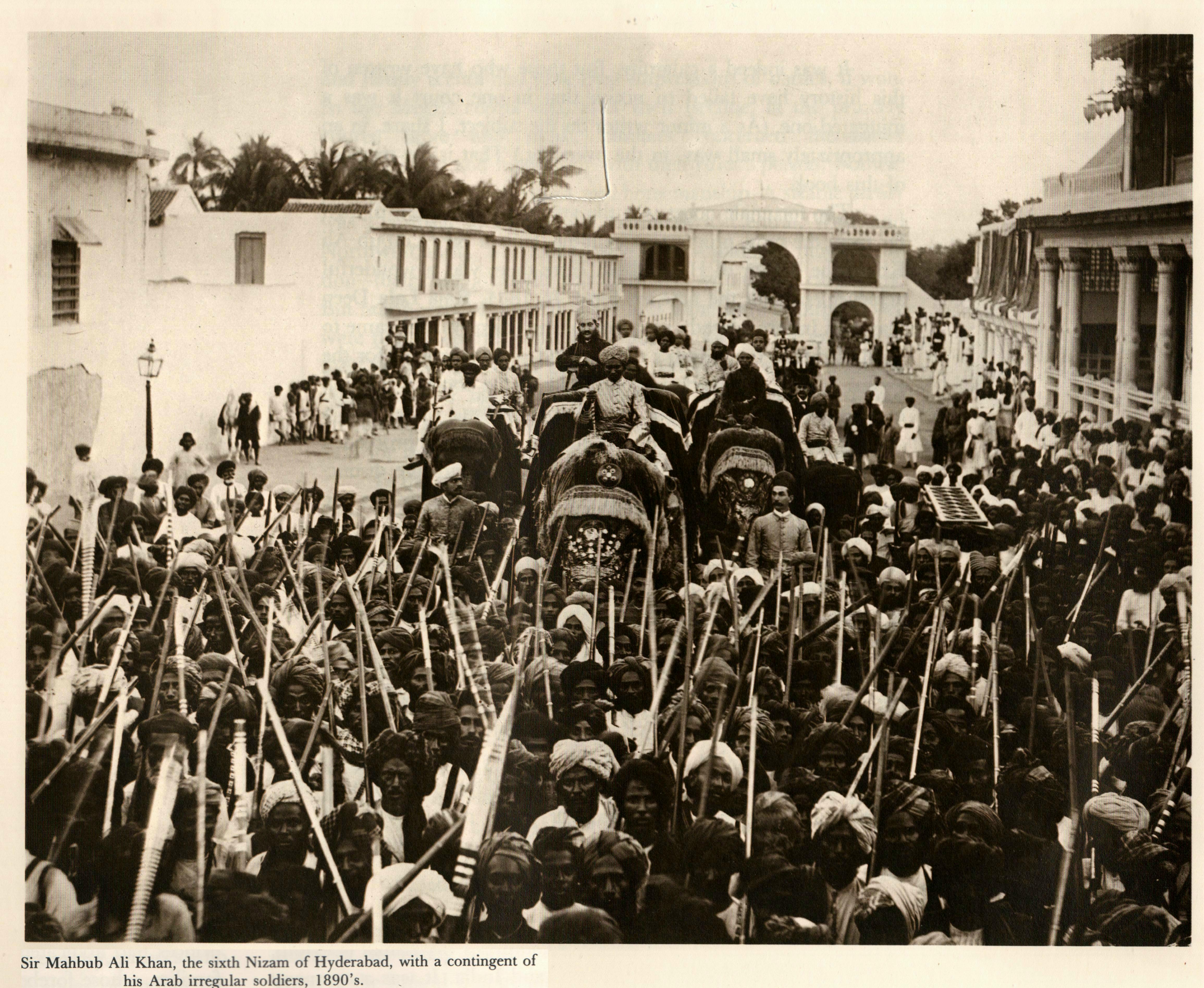
The sixth Nizam riding an elephant in a procession from Moula Ali, c. 1890s.

In 1805, after the East India Company's victory in the Second Anglo-Maratha War, the Nizam of Hyderabad came under their protection. In 1858, the state of Hyderabad became part of the British Indian Empire as a princely state with full autonomy albeit under colonial rule and was subject to the British Crown.

From 1876 to 1948, the Nizam recognised the Crown as paramount ruler of India as the monarch of the United Kingdom simultaneously held the title of emperor of India (first held by Queen Victoria as empress and the last being George VI as emperor)

In 1903, the Berar region of the state was separated and merged into the Central Provinces of British India, to form the Central Provinces and Berar.

During the Second World War, 80,000 men who were raised by the Nizam to form a personal army under the Indian State Forces, known as the 19th Hyderabad Regiment served in Malaya, North Africa, Persia, Singapore and Burma

The last Nizam of Hyderabad state, Mir Osman Ali Khan crowned in 1911, had been the richest man in the world in his time. The Nizams developed the railway, introduced electricity, and developed roads, airways, irrigation and reservoirs; in fact, all major public buildings in Hyderabad City were built during his reign during the period of British rule in India. He pushed education, science, and the establishment of Osmania University forward.

In 1947, at the time of the partition of India, the British government offered the 565 princely states in the sub-continent the options of acceding to either India or Pakistan or remaining independent.

=== End of the dynasty ===
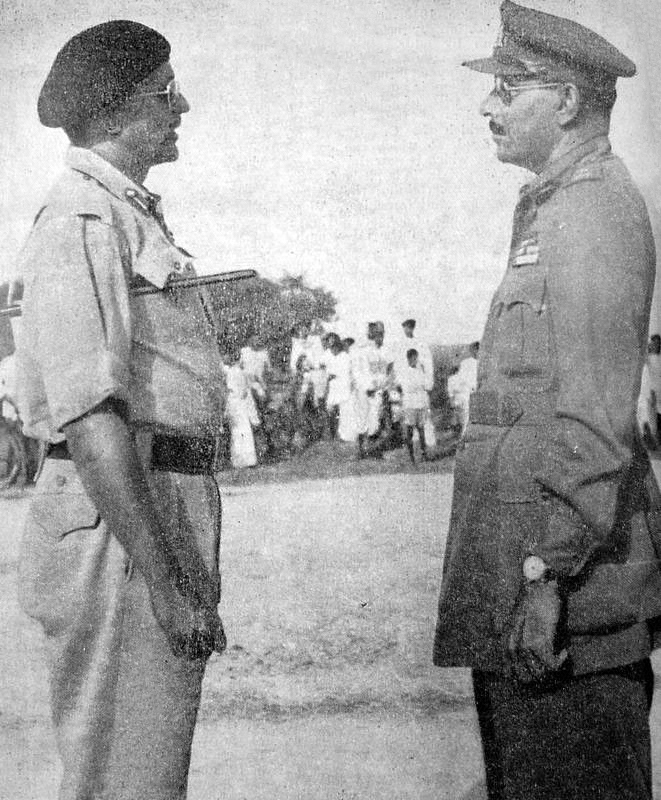
General Syed Ahmed El Edroos (at right) offers his surrender of the Hyderabad State Forces to Major General (later General and Army Chief) Jayanto Nath Chaudhuri at Secunderabad.

After the Independence of India in 1947, the Nizam of Hyderabad chose to join neither the Dominion of India nor the Dominion of Pakistan. He declared Hyderabad an independent state as the third dominion, attempting to become an independent monarchy in the British Commonwealth, sharing King George VI as head of state (since at that time members were required to share the king as head of state). Not only the Government of India, but George VI who was head of the organisation, the last emperor of India before independence and most crucially, the incumbent monarch of India rejected the notion. After attempts by India to persuade the Nizam to accede to India failed, and due to large-scale atrocities committed by Razakars (who wanted the Nizam to accede Hyderabad to Pakistan) on the Hindu populace, the Indian government finally launched a military operation named Operation Polo, in which Indian army committed massacres of Hyderabadi Muslims. The Indian Army invaded Hyderabad on 13 September 1948 and defeated his untrained forces. The Nizam capitulated on 17 September 1948; that same afternoon he broadcast the news over the State radio network. The Nizam was forced to accept accession to the new Union of India. His abdication on 17 September 1948 ended the dynasty's ambitions. Nevertheless, he became the Rajpramukh post independence based on public vote. He died on Friday, 24 February 1967.

All Nizams are buried in royal graves at the Makkah Masjid near Charminar in Hyderabad excepting the last, who wished to be buried beside his mother, in the graveyard of Judi Mosque facing King Kothi Palace.

== State wealth ==
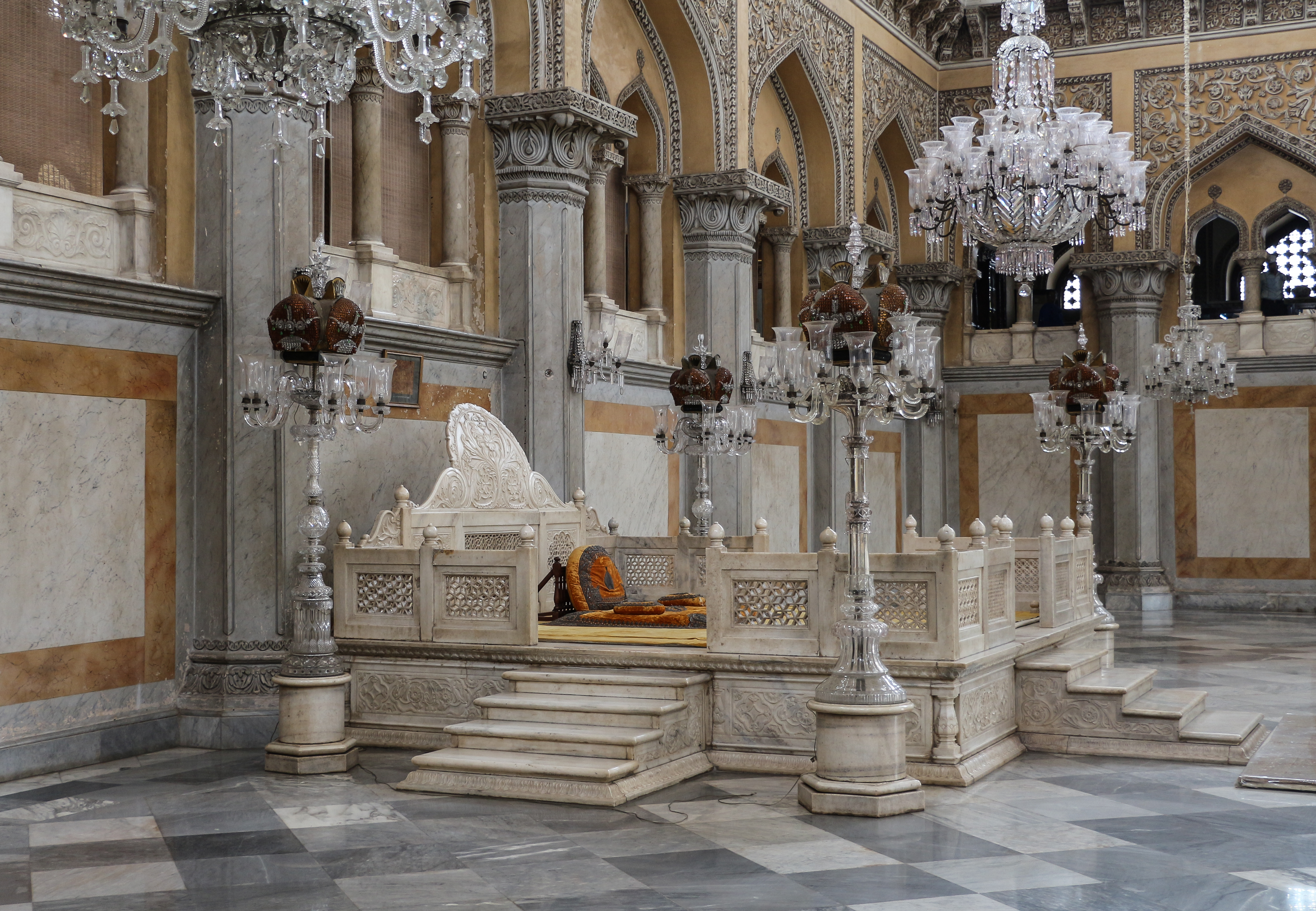
The Nizam of Hyderabad's throne in Chowmahalla Palace

During the period of the Nizams' rule, Hyderabad became wealthy, thanks to the Golconda mines which were the only sources of diamonds in the world market at that time (apart from South African mines) making the 7th Nizam the richest person in the world. Osman Ali Khan, Asaf Jah VII and his family including Salar Jung I were taught by Nawab Sarwar ul-Mulk and Agha Mirza Baig Bahadur, who was his political advisor, and the senior-most salute state among the Indian princely states. It was spread over 223,000 km^{2} (86,000 sq mi) in the Deccan, ruled by the Asaf Jahi dynasty. The Nizams were conferred with the title of His Exalted Highness, and "Faithful Ally of the British Government" for their roles in the Second and Third Anglo-Mysore Wars and the Indian Rebellion of 1857, becoming the only Indian prince to be given both these titles.

One example of the wealth of the Nizams is the Jewels of the Nizams, an international tourist attraction once displayed in Salar Jung Museum, but now locked in a Reserve Bank of India vault in Delhi. In 1948 Hyderabad state had an estimated population of 17 million (1.7 crore), and it generated an estimated annual revenue of £90,029,000.

The state had its currency known as the Hyderabadi rupee, until 1951. The pace at which the last Nizam Mir Osman Ali Khan amassed wealth made him one of the world's richest men in 1937, also known for his miserliness. He was estimated to be worth ₹ 660 crores (roughly US$2 billion by the then exchange rates). According to the Forbes All-Time Wealthiest List of 2008, Nizam Mir Osman Ali Khan is the fifth richest man in recorded history per the figures, with an estimated worth of US$210.8 billion adjusted by Forbes as per the growth of the US GDP since that period and the present exchange rate of the US dollar against the Indian rupee.

=== Institutions ===
The Nizams set up numerous institutions in the name of the dynasty including hospitals, schools, colleges, and universities that imparted education in Urdu. Inspired by the Indian Civil Service, the Nizams established their own local Hyderabad Civil Service.

=== Infrastructure ===
The Nizams commissioned engineering projects such as large reservoirs like Osman Sagar and Himayat Sagar. Survey work on the Nagarjuna Sagar Dam was also initiated during this time, although the actual work was completed under the aegis of the Government of India in 1969.

They also gave Hyderabad its railway network, the Nizam's Guaranteed State Railway which helped in setting up various industries.

Other landmarks include the Telangana High Court, City College, Public Gardens (formerly Bagh-e-Aaam), Jubilee Hall, Asafia Library, The Assembly building, Niloufer Hospital, the Osmania Arts College and the Osmania Medical College.

=== Interfaith Philanthropy ===
The 7th Nizam of Hyderabad, Mir Osman Ali Khan, was noted for his philanthropic support to Interfaith philanthropy specifically temples across the state. He donated ₹82,825 to the Sri Lakshmi Narasimha Swamy Temple at Yadagirigutta near Bhongir and ₹29,999 to the Sita Ramachandraswamy Temple at Bhadrachalam. He also provided an annual grant of ₹8,000 to the Tirupati Balaji Temple and contributed ₹50,000 towards the reconstruction of the Sitarambagh Temple in Hyderabad’s old city.

In addition, the 7th Nizam endowed approximately 1,525 acres of land to the Sita Rama Swami Temple at Devaryamjal. Beyond these individual grants, historical sources note that the Nizam donated over ₹97,000 in total and more than two lakh acres of land to various Hindu temples, reflecting his policy of interfaith patronage. His support extended to educational and religious institutions as well, including a donation of ₹1 lakh to Banaras Hindu University in 1939 and smaller annual grants to other temples and cultural organisations.

In 1932, there was a need for money for the publication of Mahabharata in the Bhandarkar Oriental Research Institute located in Pune. A formal request was made to the 7th Nizam, who granted Rs. 1000 per year for 11 years.

He also gave Rs 50,000 for construction of the guest house which stands today as "Nizam's guest house".

In addition to Hindu institutions and organisations, the 7th Nizam provided financial and land grants to churches, and gurudwaras. Notably, he laid the foundation stone for the Shrine of Our Lady of Health in Hyderabad in 1954 and supported its construction and land allocation for the church, which was inaugurated in 1959‑60. Contemporary accounts also record that he provided grants for the conservation of Sikh gurudwaras

=== Palaces ===
The Asaf Jahis were prolific builders. Their palaces are listed below:

- Chowmahalla Palace - Official residence of early Nizams
- Purani Haveli
- King Kothi Palace
- Mahboob Mansion
- Falaknuma Palace
- Bella Vista
- Hill Fort Palace
- Chiran Palace
- Saifabad Palace
- Hyderabad House, New Delhi
- Nizam Palace, Kolkata

== List of Nizams of Hyderabad (1724–1948) ==
Portrait	Titular name	Personal name	Date of birth	Nizam from	Nizam until	Date of death
	Nizam-ul-Mulk, Asaf Jah I نظام‌الملک آصف جاہ	Mir Qamar-ud-din Khan	20 August 1671	31 July 1724	1 June 1748	
	Nasir Jung نصیرجنگ	Mir Ahmed Ali Khan	26 February 1712	1 June 1748	16 December 1750	
Muzaffar Jung	Muzaffar Jung مظفرجنگ	Mir Hidayat Muhi-ud-din Sa'adullah Khan	?	16 December 1750	13 February 1751	
	Salabat Jung صلابت جنگ	Mir Sa'id Muhammad Khan	24 November 1718	13 February 1751	8 July 1762 (deposed)	16 September 1763
	Nizam-ul-Mulk, Asaf Jah II نظام‌الملک آصف جاہ دوم	Mir Nizam Ali Khan	7 March 1734	8 July 1762	6 August 1803	
	Sikander Jah, Asaf Jah III سکندر جاہ ،آصف جاہ سوم	Mir Akbar Ali Khan	11 November 1768	6 August 1803	21 May 1829	
	Nasir-ud-Daula, Asaf Jah IV ناصر الدولہ ،آصف جاہ چہارم	Mir Farqunda Ali Khan	25 April 1794	21 May 1829	16 May 1857	
	Afzal-ud-Daula, Asaf Jah V افضال الدولہ ،آصف جاہ پنجم	Mir Tahniyath Ali Khan	11 October 1827	16 May 1857	26 February 1869	
	Asaf Jah VI آصف جاہ ششم	Mir Mahbub Ali Khan	17 August 1866	26 February 1869	29 August 1911	
	Asaf Jah VII آصف جاہ ہفتم	Mir Osman Ali Khan	6 April 1886	29 August 1911	17 September 1948 (deposed)	24 February 1967

=== Descendants of the last Nizam ===
The last Nizam had 34 children, including 16 sons and 18 daughters.

The Asaf Jahi dynasty followed the order of precedence of male primogeniture regardless of the mother's marital status or rank.

His eldest son was Azam Jah (21 February 1907 – 9 October 1970), was the Prince of Berar.

Whereas, his second son Moazzam Jah, married Princess Niloufer, a princess of the Ottoman Empire.

=== Family tree ===
- I. Asaf Jah I, Yamin us-Sultanat, Rukn us-Sultanat, Jumlat ul-Mulk, Madar ul-Maham, Nizam ul-Mulk, Nizam ud-Daula, Khan-i-Dauran, Nawab Mir Ghazi ud-din Siddiqi, Khan Bahadur, Fath Jang, Sipah Salar, Nawab Subedar of the Deccan, 1st Nizam of Hyderabad (cr. 1720) (20 August 1671 – 1 June 1748). A senior governor and counsellor in the Imperial government. Defeated the Imperial forces on 19 June 1720 at Hasanpur and formed an independent state of his own. Confirmed in his possessions by Imperial firman and crowned on 31 July. Named Vice-Regent of the Mughal Empire by Emperor Muhammad Shah on 8 February 1722, secured the province of Berar on 11 October 1724 and formally made Hyderabad City his new capital on 7 December 1724.
  - II. Humayun Jah, Nizam ud-Daula, Nawab Mir Ahmad 'Ali Siddiqi, Khan Bahadur, Nasir Jang, Nawab Subedar of the Deccan, 2nd Nizam of Hyderabad (26 February 1712 – k. by the Nawab of Kadapa 16 December 1750; r. 1 June 1748 – 16 December 1750).
  - Sahibzadi Khair un-nisa Begum. Married Nawab Talib Muhi ud-din Mutasawwil Khan Bahadur, Muzaffar Jang:
    - III. Nawab Hidayat Muhi ud-din Sa'adu'llah Siddiqi, Khan Bahadur, Muzaffar Jang, Nawab Subedar of the Deccan, 3rd Nizam of Hyderabad (k. by the Nawab of Kurnool 13 February 1751; r. 16 December 1750 – 13 February 1751).
  - IV. Amir ul-Mamalik, Asaf ud-Daula, Nawab Said Muhammad Siddiqi, Khan Bahadur, Zaffar Jang, Nawab Subadar of the Deccan, 4th Nizam of Hyderabad (November 1718 – 16 September 1763; r. 13 February 1751 – 8 July 1762). Deposed by his younger brother on 8 July 1762 and killed in prison the following year, aged 44.
  - V. Asaf Jah II, Nizam ul-Mulk, Nizam ud-Daula, Nawab Mir Nizam 'Ali Siddiqi, Khan Bahadur, Fath Jang, Sipah Salar, Nawab Subadar of the Deccan, 5th Nizam of Hyderabad (7 March 1734 – 6 August 1803; r. 8 July 1762 – 6 August 1803)
    - VI. Asaf Jah III, Muzaffar ul-Mamaluk, Nizam ul-Mulk, Nizam ud-Daula, Nawab Mir Akbar 'Ali Siddiqi, Khan Bahadur, Fulad Jang, 6th Nizam of Hyderabad (11 November 1768 – 21 May 1829; r. 6 August 1803 – 21 May 1829). The first of the dynasty to be officially granted the title of Nizam.
      - VII. Rustam-i-Dauran, Aristu-i-Zaman, Asaf Jah IV, Muzaffar ul-Mamaluk, Nizam ul-Mulk, Nizam ud-Daula, Nawab Mir Farkhanda 'Ali Siddiqi, Khan Bahadur [Gufran Manzil], Sipah Salar, Fath Jang, Ayn Waffadar Fidvi-i-Senliena, Iqtidar-i-Kishwarsitan Muhammad Akbar Shah Padshah-i-Ghazi, 7th Nizam of Hyderabad (25 April 1794 – 16 May 1857; r. 21 May 1829 – 16 May 1857).
        - VIII. Asaf Jah V, Nizam ul-Mulk, Afzal ud-Daula, Nawab Mir Tahniyat 'Ali Siddiqi, Khan Bahadur, 8th Nizam of Hyderabad, GCSI (11 October 1827 – 26 February 1869; r. 16 May 1857 – 26 February 1869). The first of the dynasty to come under British rule.
          - IX. Rustam-i-Dauran, Arustu-i-Zaman, Wal Mamaluk, Asaf Jah VI, Muzaffar ul-Mamaluk, Nizam ul-Mulk, Nizam ud-Daula, Nawab Mir Mahbub 'Ali Siddiqi, Khan Bahadur, Sipah Salar, Fath Jang, 6th Nizam of Hyderabad GCB, GCSI (17 August 1866 – 31 August 1911; r. 26 February 1869 – 31 August 1911). Succeeded his father on 26 February 1869, ruled under a regency until 5 February 1884, when he was invested with full ruling powers by the Viceroy of India.
            - X. Rustam-i-Dauran, Arustu-i-Zaman, Wal Mamaluk, Asaf Jah VII, Muzaffar ul-Mamaluk, Nizam ul-Mulk, Nizam ud-Daula, Nawab Mir Osman 'Ali Siddiqi, Khan Bahadur, Sipah Salar, Fath Jang, Faithful Ally of the British Government, 10th Nizam of Hyderabad and of Berar GCSI, GBE, Royal Victorian Chain, MP (6 April 1886 – 24 January 1967; r. 31 August 1911 – 26 January 1950). Granted the style of His Exalted Highness (1 January 1918), the title of Faithful Ally of the British Government (24 January 1918) and Nizam of Hyderabad and of Berar (13 November 1936). The last of the ruling Nizams; ruled absolutely from his accession until 19 September 1948, when the state was formally annexed to the Union. Maintained semi-ruling and semi-autonomous status from then until 23 November 1949, when he accepted the paramountcy of the new Indian government and Constitution and acceded to the Union. Formally lost his sovereignty, ending 230 years of Asaf Jahi rule, upon the formal promulgation of the Constitution on 26 January 1950. Served as Rajpramukh of the new Hyderabad State from 26 January 1950 until 31 October 1956, when the post was abolished. Served as a titular monarch from 26 January 1950 until his death.
              - Azam Jah, Prince of Berar GCIE, GBE (21 February 1907 – 9 October 1970). Granted the title of His Highness the Prince of Berar (13 November 1936). Passed over in the line of succession in 1967 in favour of his elder son.
                - XI. Rustam-i-Dauran, Arustu-i-Zaman, Wal Mamaluk, Asaf Jah VIII, Muzaffar ul-Mamaluk, Nizam ul-Mulk, Nizam ud-Daula, Nawab Mir Barakat 'Ali Siddiqi, Khan Bahadur, Sipah Salar, Fath Jang, 11th Nizam of Hyderabad and Berar (6 October 1933 – 15 January 2023; 11th Nizam: 24 January 1967 – 28 December 1971; dynastic head and pretender since then).
                  - Azmet Jah, Nawab Mir Muhammad Azmat 'Ali Siddiqi, Khan Bahadur (b. 23 June 1960; appointed Prince of Berar and heir apparent: 2002)

The Nizams' daughters had been married traditionally to young men of the Paigah family. This family belonged to the Sunni sect of Islam.

italics – Considered pretenders by most historians; refrained from exercising traditional authority during their reigns.

== Places, things named after and established by the Nizams ==
Places and things named after the Nizam include Nizamabad, a city and district in the state of Telangana; Jamia Nizamia, a university; the Nizam College; The Nizam's Museum; the Nizam's Guaranteed State Railway; the Nizam's Institute of Medical Sciences; the Jewels of the Nizams; the Nizam Diamond; the Nizam Sagar, HMAS Nizam, Nizamia observatory; the Nizam Club; the Nizam of Hyderabad necklace; the Nizam's Contingent; the Nizam Gate; the Nizam Palace; Government Nizamia General Hospital; and H.E.H. the Nizam's Charitable Trust.

== See also ==
- Asaf Jahi dynasty
- Raja Shan Rai Rayan
- History of Telangana
- History of Hyderabad, India
- Hyderabadi Muslims
- Osman Ali Khan
- Mukarram Jah
- Najaf Ali Khan
- Salar Jung family
- Raja Shamraj Bahadur

== Secondary sources ==
- Benichou, Lucien D. (2000), From Autocracy to Integration: Political Developments in Hyderabad State, 1938–1948, Orient Blackswan, ISBN 978-81-250-1847-6
- Briggs, Henry George (1861). The Nizam: His History and Relations With the British Government, Volume 1. London: B. Quaritch.
- Farooqui, Salma Ahmed (2011), A Comprehensive History of Medieval India: Twelfth to the Mid-Eighteenth Century, Pearson Education India, pp. 346–, ISBN 978-81-317-3202-1
- Faruqui, Munis D. (2013), "At Empire's End: The Nizam, Hyderabad and Eighteenth-century India", in Richard M. Eaton; Munis D. Faruqui; David Gilmartin; Sunil Kumar (eds.), Expanding Frontiers in South Asian and World History: Essays in Honour of John F. Richards, Cambridge University Press, pp. 1–38, ISBN 978-1-107-03428-0
- Hastings, Fraser (1865). Our Faithful Ally, the Nizam. London: Smith, Elder & Co.
- Lethbridge, Roper (2005) [first published 1893]. "Hyderabad". The Golden Book of India. Aakar Books. p. 179. ISBN 9788187879541.
- Lynton, Harriet Ronken; Rajan, Mohini (1974). The Days of the Beloved. University of California Press. ISBN 978-0-520-02442-7.
- Nayeem, M. A. (1985). Mughal Administration of Deccan Under Nizamul Mulk Asaf Jah, 1720–48 A.D. Indian Council of Historical Research, University of Pune, Dept. of History. ISBN 9788172243258.
- Regani, Sarojini (1988) [First published 1963]. Nizam-British Relations, 1724–1857. New Delhi: Concept Publishing Company. ISBN 978-81-7022-195-1.
- Smith, Wilfred Cantwell (January 1950), "Hyderabad: Muslim Tragedy", Middle East Journal, 4 (1): 27–51, JSTOR 4322137
- Zubrzycki, John (2006). The Last Nizam: An Indian Prince in the Australian Outback. Australia: Pan Macmillan. ISBN 978-0-330-42321-2.
