= R. B. Holle =

Indian contemporary painter (born 1973)

R B Holle
- Born: 9 June 1973 (age 53); Maharashtra, India
- Education: Abhinav Kala Mahavidyalaya, Pune, Sir J. J. School of Art
- Known for: Abstract painting
- Awards: Pollock-Krasner Foundation Grant, New York 2012; Lalit Kala Akademi, Govt. of India 2012; Gold Medal, Maharashtra State 1999; The Tata Trusts Travel Grant, India, 2018

R B Holle (Rajaram B. Holle) (born 9 June 1973) is an Indian contemporary painter. He is awarded Pollock-Krasner Foundation Grant, New York in 2012, National Award in Lalit Kala Akademi by Govt. Of India in 2012.

Holle was born in 1973, in remote village, Kasari, Pune in the western Indian state of Maharashtra. He received his art diploma from the Abhinav Kala Mahavidyalaya, Pune in 1999 (1st in State-Received a Gold Medal).

== Solo exhibitions ==
- 2024 MIIT Museo, Turin, Italy organized by Pundole Art Gallery.
- 2019 FEI Art Museum Yokohama, Japan.
- 2018 MIIT Museo, Turin, Italy organized by Pundole Art Gallery.
- 2017 Carrion Gallery, Venice, Italy.
- 2017 Kokonton Gallery, Venice, Italy.
- 2012 Jehangir Art Gallery, Mumbai, organized by Pundole Art Gallery.
- 2010 Pundole Art Gallery, Mumbai.
- 2008 Troubadour art Gallery, London.
- 2004 Apparao Galleries, Chennai.
- 2003 W.F. Art Gallery, New York.

== Collections ==
- Lalit Kala Akademi, New Delhi.
- Pundole Art Gallery, Mumbai.
- Indo-American Art Council, New York.
- Hutheesing Visual Art Centre, Ahmedabad.
- Apparao Galleries, Chennai.
- Atasi Art, Pune.
- MIIT Museo, Turin, Italy.

== Awards ==
- 2024 "The Maestro Artista 2024" by MIIT Museo, Turin, Italy.
- 2022 Nelson Mandela Nobel Peace Award.
- 2022 Honorary Doctorate (art & culture), St. Mother Theresa University, U.K.
- 2018 The Tata Trusts Travel Grant, India.
- 2012 Pollock-Krasner Foundation Grant, New York.
- 2012 National Award, Lalit Kala Academy, Govt of India.
- 2006 Junior Fellowship, Cultural Dep., Govt. of India.
- 2001 ‘National Scholarship’, Lalit Kala Academy New Delhi.
- 1999 Gold Medal, Maharashtra State.

== Major works ==
- Pundole Art Gallery, Mumbai.
- Lalit Kala Academy, Govt of India.
- Apparao Gallery, Chennai.
