= Rajaram Sharma =

Indian artist

Rajaram Sharma (born 9 June 1963) is an Indian artist of Pichhwai and Indian miniature paintings.

== Life ==
He was born on 9 June 1963 in Bijolia in Bhilwara district of Rajasthan. He completed his early education in Bijolia. At the age of 13, he came to Nathdwara to train under Tulsidasji Chitrakar who was the head of Shrinathji temple. After spending 13 years learning with Tulsidasji, Sharma had made a name for himself. In 1989, B. G. Sharma, an eminent Pichhwai artist, took Rajaram under his wings to teach him the nuances of Pichhwai and miniature painting. The artist worked under him for ten years and became adept in both Pichwai and miniature paintings.

At the age of 22, the artist married Chhaya Sharma. Chhaya is the granddaughter of Bhuralal Sharma, a well-known Pichhwai artist from Nathdwara. Rajaram has two daughters, Swati Sharma and Jyoti Sharma, and a son, Rajat Sharma. Rajat is practicing miniature and contemporary art with his father.

Currently, the Rajaram works at his own studio, namely "Chitrashala", in Udaipur, where he also guides and trains upcoming artists.

== Awards and honors ==
- National Merit Certificate, 2016
- All India Award of Traditional Art, Marudhara, Kolkata (W.B.), 2010
- All Award of Traditional Art, Ujjain, (M.P.), 2004
- Gold Medal in Traditional Painting at All Art Exhibition, Jangaon, Warangal (A.P.), 2002
- All India Special Award of Traditional Art, T.A.H.S., Karnataka, 2001
- All India Award of Traditional & Folk Art, SZCC, 2001
- First Prize in District Handicraft Contest, Udaipur (Raj.), 1998
- Specially Honored by Education Minister, 1998
