= Raja Ram Yadav =

Indian physicist

Prof. (Dr.) Raja Ram Yadav
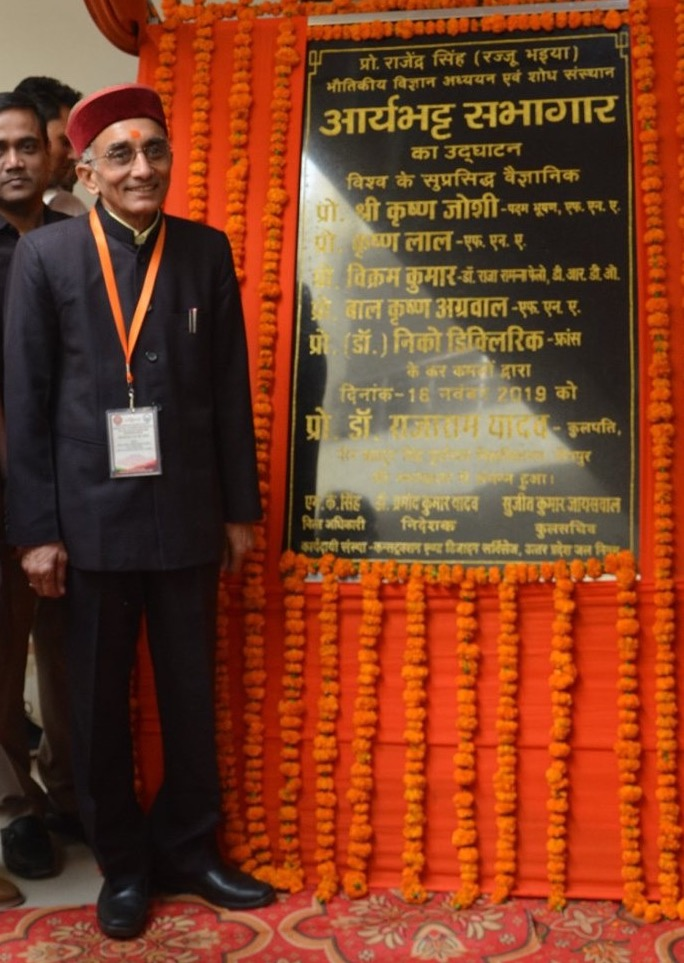
- Raja Ram Yadav as Vice-Chancellor of Veer Bahadur Singh Purvanchal University in 2019
- Born: 4 January 1957 (age 69); Mahoba, Uttar Pradesh, India

Academic background
- Education: B.Sc., M.Sc., PhD
- Alma mater: University of Allahabad
- Doctoral advisor: 19

Academic work
- Discipline: Physicist
- Sub-discipline: Ultrasonics, Nanoscience & Technology, Optical Spectroscopy, Nondestructive Evaluations
- Institutions: Veer Bahadur Singh Purvanchal University; University of Allahabad; Mahatma Gandhi Chitrakoot Gramoday Vishwavidyalaya; Oil and Natural Gas Corporation

Raja Ram Yadav (born 4 January 1957) is a professor of Physics worked at University of Allahabad and former vice-chancellor of Veer Bahadur Singh Purvanchal University.

== Education and career ==
Yadav completed his B.Sc., M.Sc. and PhD from University of Allahabad in 1977, 1979 and 1988 respectively. He served as a geophysicist (Wells) in the Oil and Natural Gas Commission for the government of India from 1983 to1988, when he resigned and became RSS Pracharak from 1988 to 1992. Since July 1992, he has worked as a lecturer of Mahatma Gandhi Chitrakoot Gramoday Vishwavidyalaya. He joined University of Allahabad in 1996 as an associate professor and became a professor in 2004. In 2017 he was named as vice chancellor of Veer Bahadur Singh Purvanchal University, a post he served until 2020. He is currently serving as head of the Department of Physics in the University of Allahabad.
