= Exalted Highness =

Form of address used for Nizam of Hyderabad and Berar

Exalted Highness (in address Your Exalted Highness and in reference His Exalted Highness, the latter is abbreviated as H.E.H.) is a formal style used to address the Nizam of Hyderabad of Berar. It is a more elevated style than His Highness.

== Background ==
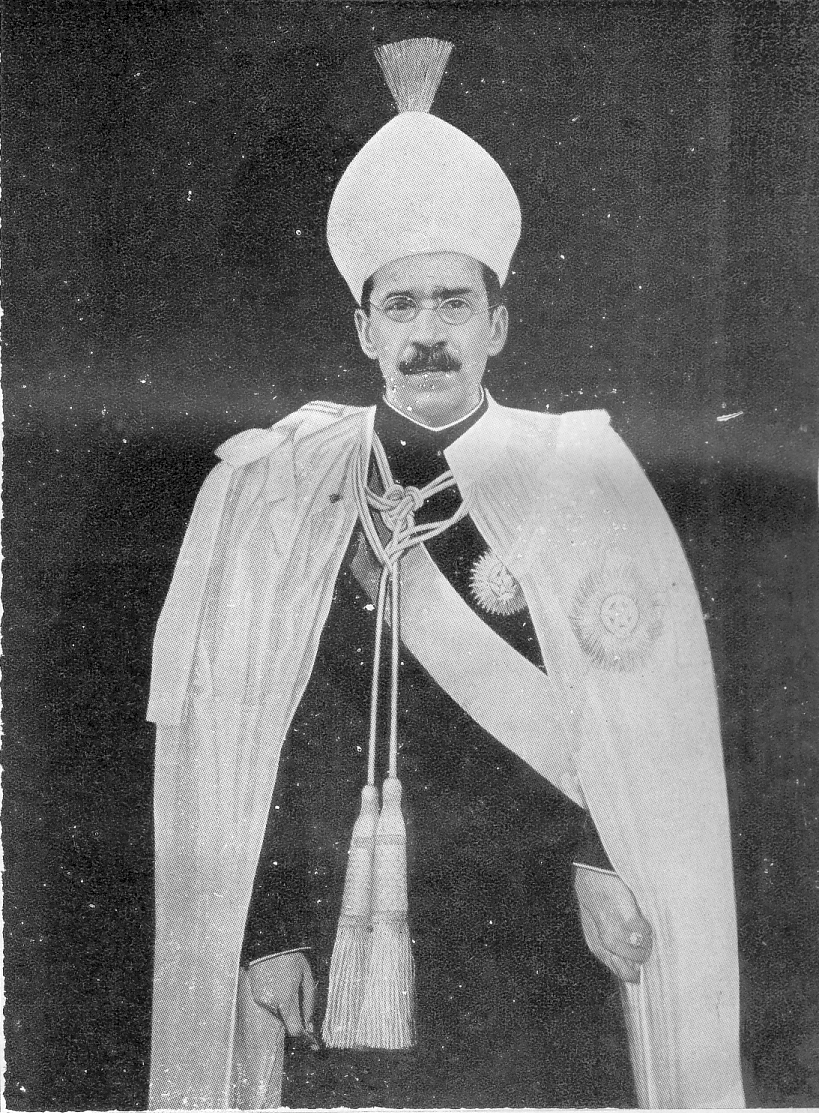
Mir Osman Ali Khan

The Hyderabad State, which was the premier princely state of India, covered an area of 82,698 square miles. Upon the outbreak of World War I in Europe in 1914, the then Nizam, Mir Osman Ali Khan, placed the resources of his state and its troops at the disposal of George V and of the British government. The first thing he did was make a £400,000 contribution towards the war expenses. He also paid, in particular, the entire cost incurred during the war by the regiment of Imperial Service Troops maintained by his own state and by the 20th Deccan Horse. The former was dispatched to Egypt in 1914 and remained in service there and in Palestine throughout the war. During the service, it saw action several times and sustained a number of casualties.

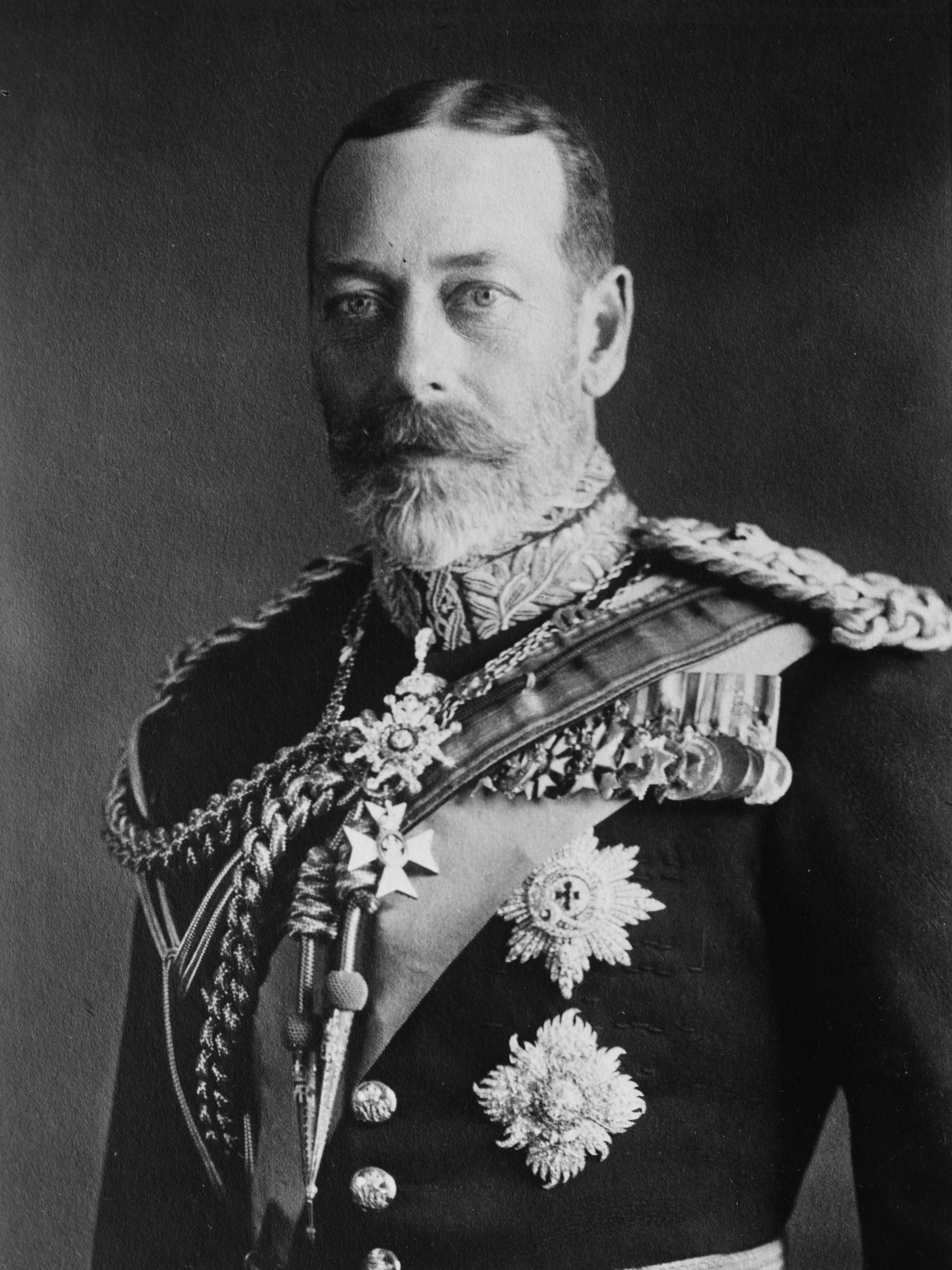
George V

The state also deputed 100 rough-riders and 2 officers to Mathura in 1915 to train horses for the cavalry throughout the war. It appointed assistant recruiting officers, financed all recruiting expenses, and recruited 5,000 men for the Indian Army by June 1918. It also permitted European and Anglo-Indian civil officers to join the army while retaining their civil appointments, pension rights and receiving allowances, and granted special leave and pay concessions to government employees undergoing Indian Defence Force training. The state also re-armed the 20th Deccan Horse with new-pattern swords at the cost of Rs. 10,000, provided chargers to its six officers, and sold the Government of India 167 mules, 150 cavalry horses and 35 artillery horses.

The state also loaned 50 lakhs in silver bullion to the Government of India in 1918, and its mint stamp department printed and supplied, free of charge, the Madras War Fund Stamps and the Hyderabad Ladies' War Relief Association Stamps.

The state made the following financial contributions towards the war effort:

No.	Description	Type	Amount (Rs.)	Reference
1	4% loan of 1916–1917	Subscriptions to the War Loans	39,00,000	
2	5% loan of 1929–1947	Subscriptions to the War Loans	75,00,000	
3	5½% War Bonds repayable in 1921	Subscriptions to the War Loans	50,00,000	
4	Contribution towards payment of the war charges of the 20th Deccan Horse and 1st Hyderabad Imperial Service Cavalry	Free gifts	1,53,00,000	
5	Contribution towards the Prince of Wales's Relief Fund	Free gifts	1,00,000	
6	Contribution to the Imperial Relief Fund of India	Free gifts	1,00,000	
7	Contribution to the admiralty in aid of the Anti-Submarine Campaign	Free gifts	15,00,000	
8	Special donation towards the prosecution of the war	Free gifts	15,00,000	
9	Contribution from the "Our Day" collections to the Red Cross	Free gifts	1,00,000	
10	Contribution to Their Majesties for the relief of sufferers from the war on the occasion of their 25th wedding anniversary	Free gifts	3,75,000	
11	Share of the expenditure of Hospital Ship Loyalty	Free gifts	2,00,000	
12	Other subscriptions	Subscriptions	1,44,000	

== Origin ==
This special style of Exalted Highness originated on 24 January 1918, when George V, in recognition of the help provided and services rendered by Mir Osman Ali Khan and his state during World War I, singled him out from the rest of the ruling princes of India and conferred upon him this style as a hereditary distinction.

== Text ==
The text of the letter dated 24 January 1918, which George V wrote from Buckingham Palace to Mir Osman Ali Khan to confer this style on him, is below:

Your Exalted Highness,

It has given me great satisfaction to show my appreciation of the eminent services which you have rendered to my Empire during the War by conferring upon you the special style of "Exalted Highness" and by confirming to you formally the honourable title of "Faithful Ally" of the British Government by which Your Exalted Highness and your predecessors have long emphasized your loyalty to my ancestors and myself. Following the high example of your illustrious predecessors at the time of the signature of the early treaties between the British Government and the Hyderabad State and afterwards in the days of the Indian Mutiny, Your Exalted Highness has again given in your own person clear proof of your right to bear that historic title. In the prominent position enjoyed by Your Exalted Highness as the leading Muhammadan Prince of India, your loyalty was displayed in the early months of the present war by the issue of a Proclamation enjoining on your subjects and impressing on your co-religionists throughout India the duty of firm and steadfast devotion to my Throne and Empire. The munificent contribution made by Your Exalted Highness from time to time for objects connected with the war have borne striking and public testimony to the strength of the enduring bond which unites the destinies of Great Britain and Hyderabad.

Trusting that Your Exalted Highness may long continue to enjoy health and prosperity, I sign myself your sincere friend and Emperor,

GEORGE, R. I.
