= Vatandar =

Land-Owner from Western India

The Vatandar or Watandar (Hindi/Marathi : वतनदार) is an Indian term meaning "landholder". The title was given to landowners, particularly in Maharashtra.

The Vatandar generally owned a plot of land or Vatan/Watan worked by the local people, who were dependent on the vatandar for their subsistence. In some cases, "Vatan" land and the title vatandar were awarded to an individual by a higher ruler as reward for meritorious military service.

The grant of a Watan territory differed from the grant of an "Inam" and a person might hold either or both. While a Watan was a hereditary rent-free grant to a village resident in lieu of services that the resident was expected to perform for the village on an ongoing basis, an Inam was granted in recognition of past service to the state, usually but not always in relation to the military. A Watan grant continued for as long as its holder had the confidence of the village community, whilst an Inam grant, which might also take the form of a share of village land revenues, was held in perpetuity.

== Communities Of Vatandars ==
- Maratha 96 Kulis - Many people from this community were Vatandars due to heavy participation in the military of the Maratha Empire and Ahmadnagar Sultanate/Nizam Shahi. (Example Raghuji Bhosale Clan of Nagpur)
- Koli - Vatandar, or Watandar is a title of the Kolis who were Vatandar in Maratha Empire and "landholder Kolis". (Famous Example - Bamble Clan of Yavatmal)
- Vanjari - A north-Indian community which were awarded 'Vatan' for their military duties as soldiers & commissariats of the Maratha and Rajput Empires (Famous Example - Garje Clan of Ahmadnagar & Beed).
- Brahmin - the Brahmins were Vatandars under rulers but they were hereditary priests for their Kings & rulers; received the Vatan for their duties as family priest. (Famous Example - Patwardhan Clan of Miraj)
- Dhangar - A community in Maharashtra which were awarded 'Vatan' for their meritorious military service in the Maratha Empire. (Famous Example - Malhar Rao Holkar of Indore State)

== See also ==
- Bara Balutedar
- Jagirdar
- Ryot
- Zamindar
- Saranjamdar
