= Rajaram Amrut Bhalerao =

Indian gastroenterologist (1933–2020)

Rajaram Amrut Bhalerao (Marathi: डॉ. राजाराम बाळ भालेराव; 1933 – 21 February 2020), also known as Bal Bhalerao, was a doctor, professor, and patron of Marathi language theatre and Marathi literature in India. He sat on several literature and theatre committees appointed by the government of Maharashtra. As a medical doctor, he was a recipient of the Dr. B. C. Roy Award instituted by the Medical Council of India, a statutory body under India's Ministry of Health and Family Welfare.

== Contributions to Marathi theatre ==
In 1935, Bhalerao's father, Dr. A N Bhalerao, founded the Mumbai Marathi Sahitya Sangh, a cultural organisation devoted to reviving Marathi theatre. The junior Bhalerao started acting on stage in 1942. Years later, he took over as the Chief Secretary of the organisation his father founded and lead it for over half a century. The Mumbai Marathi Sahitya Sangh was one of the founding members of the All India Marathi Association, responsible for taking Marathi literature and drama to audiences in America, Dubai and Singapore.

Bhalerao stewarded the theatre troupe that staged C T Khanolkar’s Ajab Nyay Vartulacha (अजब न्याय वर्तुळाचा) – a Marathi adaption of Bertolt Brecht’s The Caucasian Chalk Circle – becoming the first play in an Indian language to be staged outside India when it was performed at the Festspiele in East Berlin and Zurich in 1974. The play was directed by Vijaya Mehta in collaboration with Fritz Bennewitz. Bhalerao focused on reviving old Marathi plays, as well as adaptations and translations for modern audiences. Works brought to the Marathi stage included Shakespeare, Gogol and several Indian playwrights. Prominent examples include:

- Stage adaptation of P L Deshpande's 1952 film Ammaldar (अंमलदार) – based on Nikolai Gogol's Inspector General
- Staging the works of Honaji Bala
- Staging Kusumagraj's Marathi adaptation of Shakespeare's Macbeth as Rajmukut (राजमुकुट; transl: 'The Royal Crown')
- Stage adaptation of the 1967 Marathi film Sant Gora Kumbhar about the eponymous saint

In 1964, the Mumbai Marathi Sahitya Sangh built a new auditorium modeled after London's The Old Vic in Kelewadi, Girgaon. In 2013, Bhalerao gave the space to house the Drama School Mumbai – rent-free the first year – where it still operates (as of January 2021).

He sat on several literature and theatre committees appointed by the government of Maharashtra.

== Medical career ==
Bhalerao completed his MBBS training in India and then completed his Fellowship of the Royal Colleges of Surgeons (FRCS) in London. In 1965, he began practising surgery at the King Edward Memorial Hospital in Mumbai. He remained there till 1985, serving as Professor and Head of Department of Surgery. He was later Head of Department of Surgery and Director – Strategy & Medical Planning at Hinduja Hospital in Mumbai. A specialist in gastroenterology and liver disease, he was a recipient of the Dr. B. C. Roy Award.
