= History and culture of breastfeeding =

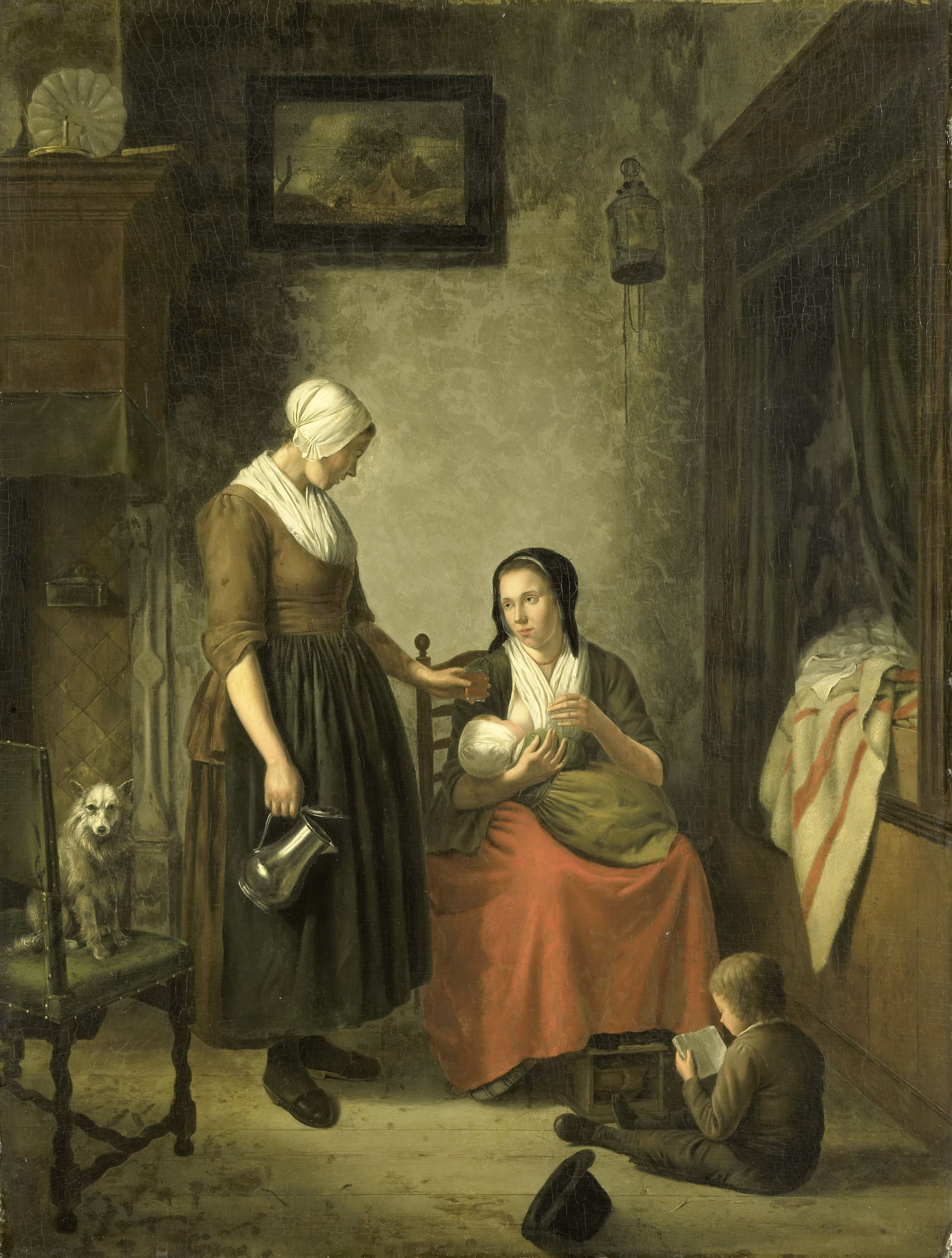
Painting of a woman breastfeeding at home, Netherlands

The history and culture of breastfeeding traces the changing social, medical and legal attitudes to breastfeeding, the act of feeding a child breast milk directly from breast to mouth. Breastfeeding may be performed by the infant's mother or by a surrogate, typically called a wet nurse.

In most societies, women nurse their own babies unless prevented by illness or death. Before the availability of infant formula, in such situations, unless a wet nurse was found promptly, the baby faced a high risk of starvation and infant mortality rates were high. Wet nurses were a normal part of the social order, though social attitudes to wet nursing varied, as well as to the social status of the wet nurse. Breastfeeding itself began to be seen as common; too common to be done by royalty, even in ancient societies, and wet nurses were employed to breastfeed the children of royal families. This attitude extended over time, particularly in Western Europe, where babies of noble women were often nursed by wet nurses. Lower-class women breastfed their infants and used a wet nurse only if they were unable to feed their own infant.

Attempts were made in 15th-century Europe to use cow or goat milk, but these attempts were not successful. In the 18th century, flour or cereal mixed with broth were introduced as substitutes for breastfeeding, but this was also unsuccessful. Improved infant formulas appeared in the mid-19th century, providing an alternative to wet nursing, and even breastfeeding itself.

During the early 20th century, breastfeeding started to be viewed negatively, especially in Canada and the United States, where it was regarded as a low-class and uncultured practice. The use of infant formulas increased, which accelerated after World War II. From the 1960s onwards, breastfeeding experienced a revival which continued into the 2000s, though negative attitudes towards breastfeeding were still entrenched up to the 1990s.

== Early history ==
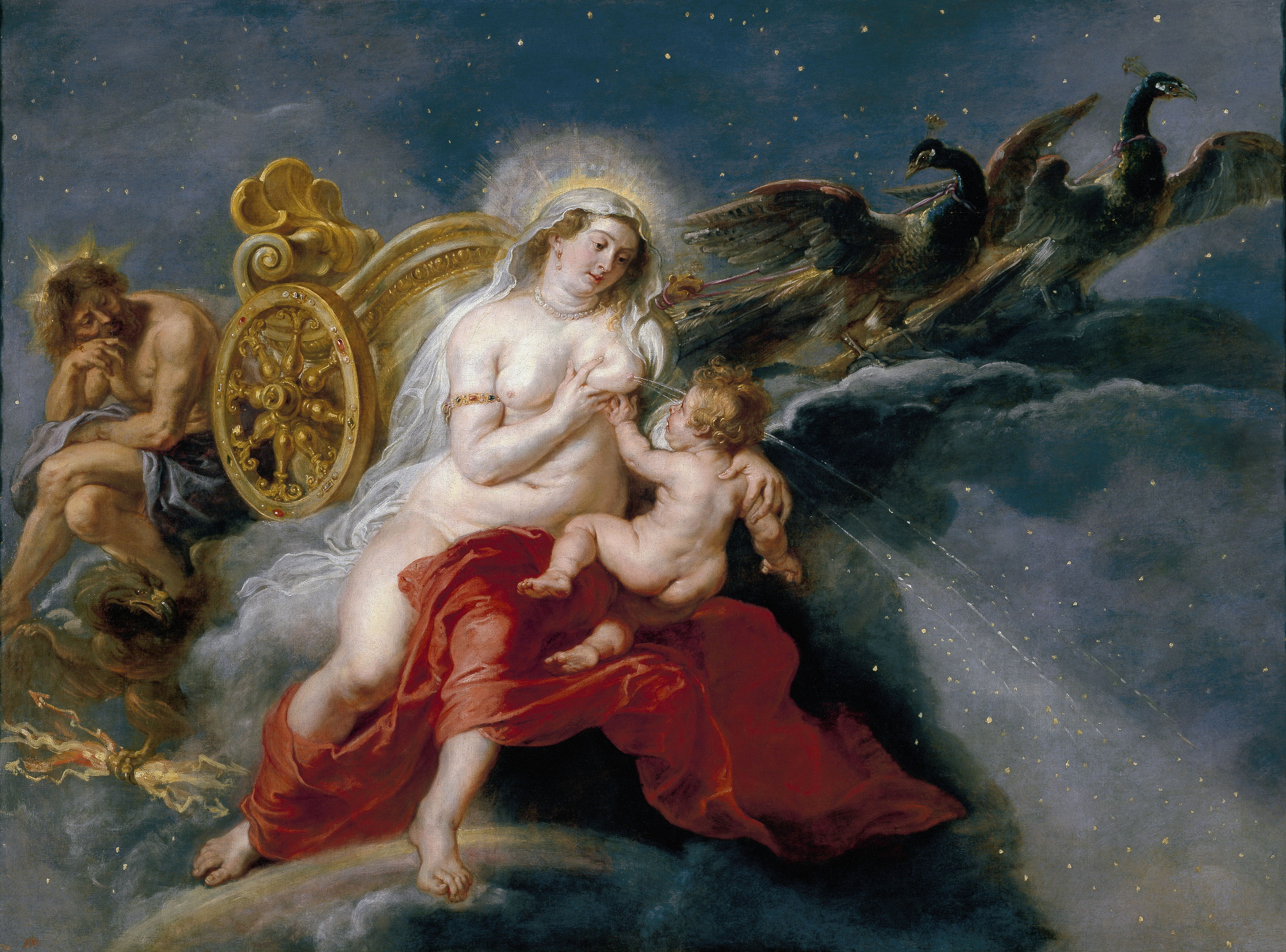
The Birth of the Milky Way, Peter Paul Rubens (c. 1637)

In Egypt, Greece and Rome, women usually fed only their own children. However, breastfeeding began to be seen as something too common to be done by royalty, and wet nurses were employed to breastfeed the children of the royal families. This was extended over the ages, particularly in Western Europe, where noble women often made use of wet nurses. The Moche artisans of Peru (1–800 A.D.) represented women breastfeeding their children in ceramic vessels. Shared breastfeeding is still practiced in many developing countries when mothers need help to feed their children.

=== Classical mythology ===
In the myth of Heracles, the infant hero was abandoned and brought by either Zeus or Hermes to the sleeping Hera to nurse. When the goddess awoke, she pulled the child from her breast, and the milk that spilled forth created the Milky Way. In another version, Athena presents Heracles to Hera as an abandoned baby, whom the goddess suckled. When he bit her, she pulled him away in pain, and Athena returned him to his mortal parents. Several authors and scholars state this was what gave Heracles his divine strength.

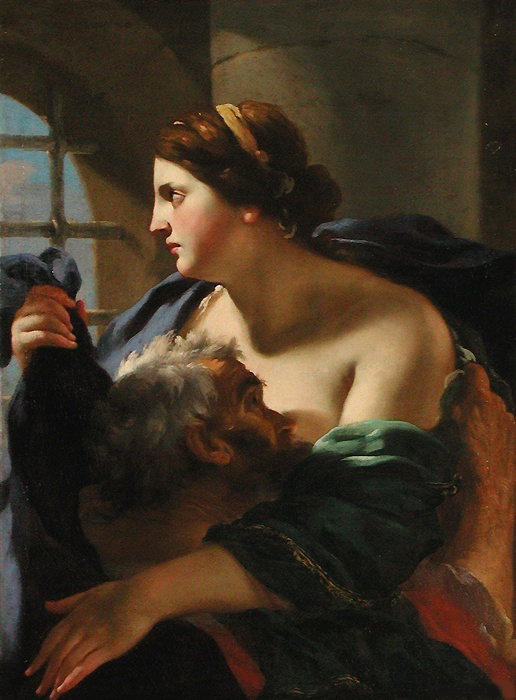
Cimon and Pero, Charles Mellin (c. 1628).

A Roman exemplum sees a man named Cimon, sentenced to death by starvation, visited by his daughter, Pero. Pero breastfeeds her father to save him and, when the act is discovered by his jailers, both are pardoned. The story was used as an example of filial piety.

=== Islam ===
In the Qur'an, it is stated that a child should be breastfed if both parents agree:

Mothers may breastfeed their children two complete years for whoever wishes to complete the nursing ... And if you wish to have your children nursed by a substitute, there is no blame upon you as long as you give payment according to what is acceptable. (parts of Surat al-Baqarah 2:233) ... and his gestation and weaning [period] is thirty months... (part of Surat al-Ahqaf 46:15)

Islam has recommended breastfeeding for two years until 30 months, either by the mother or a wet nurse. Even in pre-Islamic Arabia children were breastfed, commonly by wet nurses.

== 18th century ==
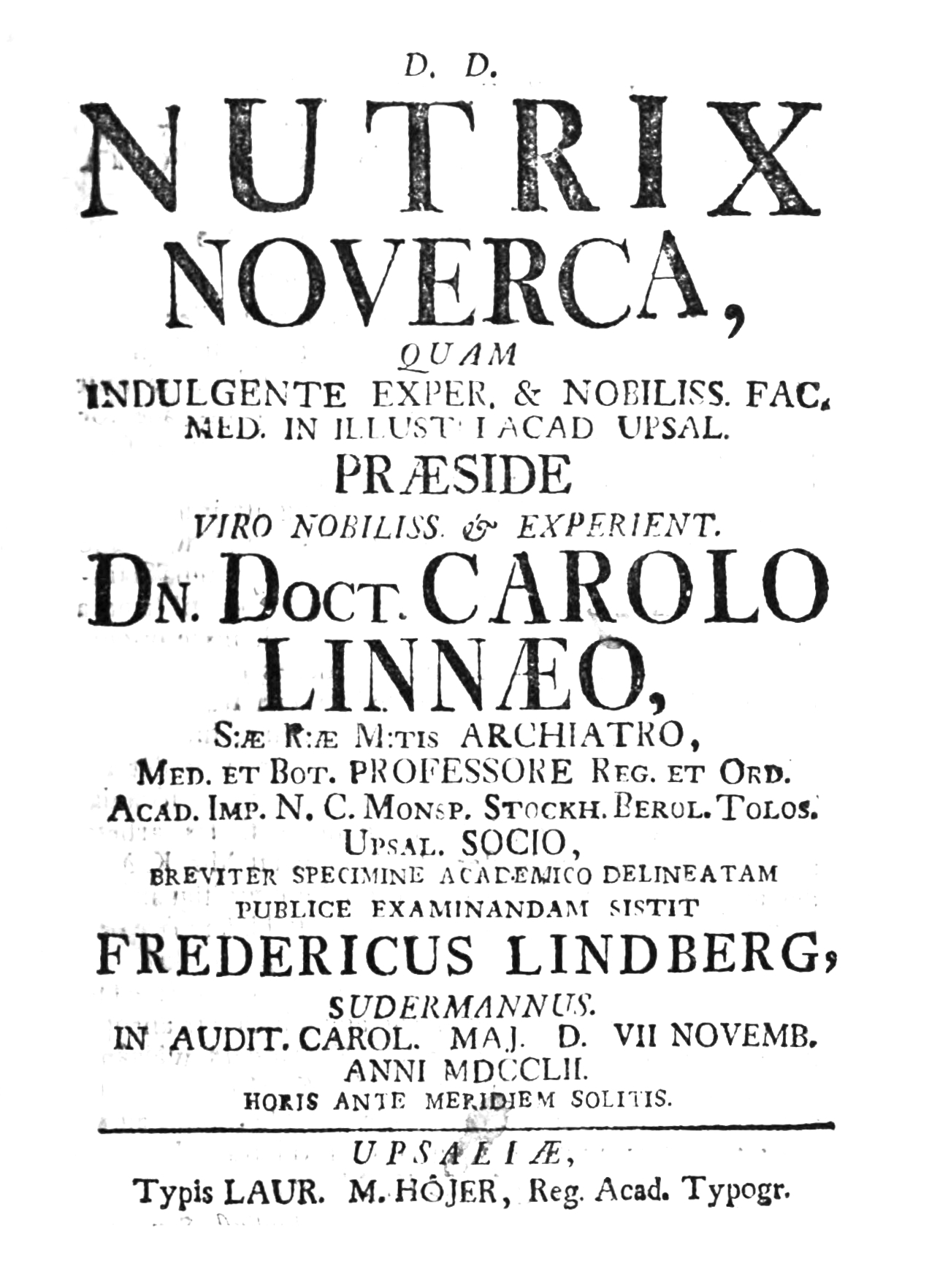
Cover of Linnaeus' Nutrix Noverca (1752)

In the 18th century, male medical practitioners started to work in the areas of pregnancy, birth and babies, areas traditionally dominated by women. Also in the 18th century, the emerging natural sciences argued that women should stay at home to nurse and raise their children, like animals also do. Governments in Europe started to worry about the decline of the workforce because of the high mortality rates among newborns. Wet nursing was considered one of the main problems. Campaigns were launched against the custom among the higher class to use a wet nurse. Women were advised or even forced by law to nurse their own children. The biologist and physician Linnaeus, the English doctor Cadogan, Rousseau, and the midwife Anel le Rebours described in their writings the advantages and necessity of women breastfeeding their own children and discouraged the practice of wet nursing. Sir Hans Sloane noted the value of breast-feeding in reducing infant mortality in 1748. His Chelsea manor, which was later converted to a botanic garden, was visited by Carl Linnaeus in 1736. In 1752 Linnaeus wrote a pamphlet against the use of wet nurses. Linnaeus considered this against the law of nature. A baby not nursed by the mother was deprived of the laxative colostrum. Linnaeus thought that the lower-class wet nurses ate too much fat, drank alcohol and had contagious (venereal) diseases, therefore producing lethal milk.

Mother's milk was considered a miracle fluid which could cure people and give wisdom. The mythical figure Philosophia-Sapientia, the personification of wisdom, suckled philosophers at her breast and by this way they absorbed wisdom and moral virtue. On the other hand, lactation was what connected humans with animals. Linnaeus – who classified the realm of animals – did not by accident rename the category 'quadrupedia' (four footed) in 'mammalia' (mammals). With this act, he made the lactating female breast the icon of this class of animals in which humans were classified.

== 19th century ==
Breastfeeding continued to be perceived as an obligation for many women into the 19th century, though "hand raising" had grown in popularity, in part due to the belief that breastfeeding sapped a woman of her energy.

Historian Rima D. Apple writes in her book Mothers and Medicine. A Social History of Infant Feeding, 1890–1950 that in the United States of America most babies received breastmilk. Dutch historian Van Eekelen researched the small amount of available evidence of breastfeeding practices in The Netherlands. Around 1860 in the Dutch province of Zeeland, about 67% of babies were nursed, but there were big differences within the region. Women were obliged to nurse their babies: "Every mother ought to nurse her own child, if she is fit to do it (...) no woman is fit to have a child who is not fit to nurse it."

Mother's milk was considered best for babies, but the quality of the breastmilk was found to be varied. The quality of breastmilk was considered good only if the mother had a good diet, had physical exercise and was mentally in balance. In Europe (especially in France) and less in the USA it was a practice among the higher and middle class to hire a wet nurse. If it was too difficult to find a wet nurse, people used formula to feed their babies, but this was considered very dangerous for the health and life of the baby.

== Decline and resurgence in the 20th and 21st centuries ==
Breastfeeding in the Western world experienced a sharp decline from the late 1800s through the 1960s. This drop was largely driven by the rise of pasteurized milk and the commercial availability of infant formula, which became socially and medically promoted alternatives, particularly among upwardly mobile and educated mothers. By the 1950s, breastfeeding had come to be perceived as old-fashioned, associated with lower-class and uneducated women, and even described as "a little disgusting" among the more affluent and professionally endorsed by medical establishments .

Letters and editorials in women's magazines like Chatelaine during 1945–1995 predominantly reflected negative perceptions of breastfeeding, reinforcing the widespread stigma.

However, beginning in the mid‑1960s, a notable resurgence in breastfeeding took hold in Canada and the U.S., led predominantly by more educated and affluent women.

=== Historical data highlights ===
Period	Initial breastfeeding at birth	Breastfeeding at 6 months
1931–35	> 70%	~ 40%
1946–50	~ 50%	~ 20%
Early 1970s	~ 25%	< 14%

=== Global targets for exclusive breastfeeding ===
The World Health Assembly (2012) endorsed a global target for exclusive breastfeeding of at least 50% of infants under six months by 2025, consistent with the WHO/UNICEF Global Strategy for Infant and Young Child Feeding.

Current estimates show approximately 44–48% of infants under six months worldwide are exclusively breastfed, indicating progress yet falling slightly short of the target.

=== Canada ===
A 1994 Canadian government health survey found that 73% of Canadian mothers initiated breastfeeding, up from 38% in 1963. It has been speculated that the gap between breastfeeding generations in Canada contributes to the lack of success of those who do attempt it: new parents cannot look to older family members for help with breastfeeding since they are also ignorant on the topic. Indigenous women in Canada are particularly affected by their loss of traditional breastfeeding knowledge, which taught mothers to breastfeed for at least 2 years and up to 4–5 years after birth, as a result of settler colonialism; Indigenous mothers now initiate breastfeeding and exclusively breastfeed for at least 6 months at significantly lower rates than non-Indigenous mothers in Canada. Western Canadians are more likely to breastfeed; just 53% of Atlantic province mothers breastfeed, compared to 87% in British Columbia. More than 90% of women surveyed said they breastfeed because it provides more benefits for the baby than does formula. Of women who did not breastfeed, 40% said formula feeding was easier (the most prevalent answer). Women who were older, more educated, had higher income, and were married were the most likely to breastfeed. Immigrant women were also more likely to breastfeed. About 40% of mothers who breastfeed do so for less than three months. Women were most likely to discontinue breastfeeding if they perceived themselves to have insufficient milk. However, among women who breastfed for more than three months, returning to work or a previous decision to stop at that time were the top reasons.

A 1996 article in the Canadian Journal of Public Health found that, in Vancouver, 82.9% of mothers initiated breastfeeding, but that this differed by Caucasian (91.6%) and non-Caucasian (56.8%) women. Just 18.2% of mothers breastfeed at nine months; breastfeeding practices were significantly associated with the mothers' marital status, education and family income.

A 2003 La Leche League International study found that 72% of Canadian mothers initiate breastfeeding and that 31% continue to do so past four to five months.

=== China ===
In 2015 the UNICEF recorded that the exclusive breastfeeding rate is 28% in China nationally. In 2019, the China Development Research Foundation found 29% of babies under 6 months were breastfed. China has implemented many provisions contained in the International Code of Marketing of Breast-milk Substitutes as adopted by the World Health Assembly in 1981. In 2021, China's National Health Commission launched the Breastfeeding Promotion Action Plan (2021-2025) with the goal of achieving the WHO target breastfeeding rate of 50% for babies under 6 months by the end of 2025. The plan also aims at 80% coverage of public facilities to support breastfeeding mothers.

=== Cuba ===
Breastfeeding in Cuba has been officially recognized and supported by the Cuban government since the 1940 constitution, which included provisions promoting maternal and child health. The support for breastfeeding was further strengthened in the 1975 constitution, particularly through Article 68, which outlines protections for women during pregnancy and nursing.

Article 68 guarantees that women receive paid leave both before and after childbirth. Specifically, it provides for six weeks of paid leave before and six weeks after giving birth, ensuring that women retain their employment and associated rights during this period. Additionally, the article includes specific provisions to support breastfeeding mothers once they return to work. It mandates two extraordinary daily rest periods of half an hour each, allowing mothers to breastfeed or express milk for their children while still at work. This protection aims to facilitate the continuation of breastfeeding even after maternity leave has ended, promoting the health and well-being of both mother and child.

In addition to legal protections, Cuba has implemented several public health initiatives to encourage breastfeeding as part of the country's broader focus on maternal and child health. The Cuban government, through its healthcare system, promotes breastfeeding as an essential part of infant nutrition. Cuba has adopted the World Health Organization's recommendations, advocating for exclusive breastfeeding for the first six months of a child's life and continued breastfeeding alongside complementary foods up to two years of age or beyond.

Cuba's efforts to promote breastfeeding are also supported by its robust healthcare infrastructure, which provides free prenatal and postnatal care to all women. Healthcare professionals in Cuba receive training in breastfeeding support and education, and the country's healthcare system includes programs designed to increase public awareness about the benefits of breastfeeding. These efforts are part of a broader maternal and child health strategy that has contributed to low infant mortality rates and improved child health outcomes.

In 2019, only 40.9% of infants in Cuba were exclusively breastfed for the first six months of life.

=== Japan ===
Traditionally, Japanese women gave birth at home and breastfed with the help of breast massage. Weaning was often late, with breastfeeding, in rare cases, continuing until early adolescence. After World War II, Western medicine was taken to Japan and the women began giving birth in hospitals, where the baby was usually taken to the nursery and given formula milk. In 1974, a new breastfeeding promotional campaign by the government helped to boost the awareness of its benefits and its prevalence has sharply increased. Japan became the first developed country to have a baby-friendly hospital, and as of 2006, has another 24 such facilities.

=== United Kingdom ===
Between 2005 and 2010 breastfeeding initiation in the UK increased from 76% to 81%, exclusive breastfeeding at three months increased from 13% to 17% and exclusive breastfeeding at six months increased from 7% to 12%. In Scotland, the 2018 Scottish Maternal and Infant Nutrition Survey found that breastfeeding at six months rose between 2010 and 2017 from 32% to 43%. The Baby Friendly Initiative, in line with the WHO and UK governments' recommendations, currently promotes exclusive breastfeeding to six months.

However, in a study published in the UK in 2015, a lack of role models such as mothers, other female relatives, and friends who breastfeed was cited as one of the potential barriers for breastfeeding. Breastfeeding during family gatherings or in the presence of others has also been reported as a challenge for some women from ethnic minority groups in the United Kingdom.

=== United States ===
In the United States, 85.7% of infants born in 2022 were ever breastfed, indicating high initiation rates. However, rates drop significantly over time: only 47.6% were exclusively breastfed through 3 months, and 27.9% through 6 months. While 39.5% were still breastfeeding at 12 months.

=== Developing nations ===
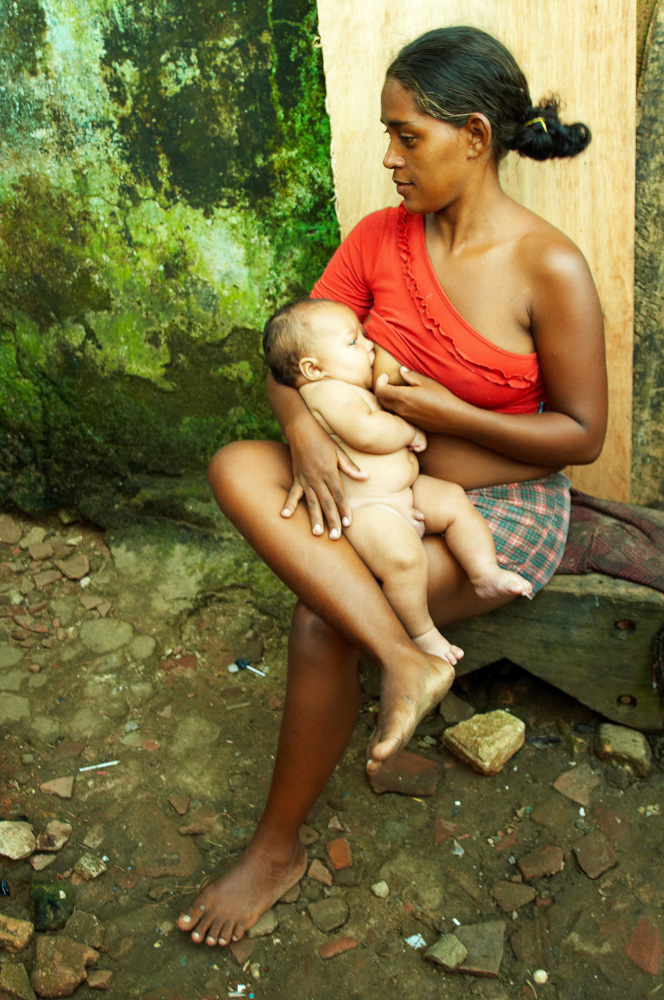
A woman breastfeeding in a Brazilian favela.

In many countries, particularly those with a generally poor level of health, malnutrition is the major cause of death in children under 5, with 50% of all those cases being within the first year of life. International organisations such as Plan International and La Leche League have helped to promote breastfeeding around the world, educating new mothers and helping the governments to develop strategies to increase the number of women exclusively breastfeeding.

Traditional beliefs in many developing countries give different advice to women raising their newborn child. In Ghana babies are still frequently fed with tea alongside breastfeeding, reducing the benefits of breastfeeding and inhibiting the absorption of iron, important in the prevention of anaemia.

== Publicity, promotion and law ==
In response to public pressure, the health departments of various governments have recognised the importance of encouraging mothers to breastfeed. The required provision of baby-changing facilities was a large step towards making public places more accessible for parents and in many countries there are now laws in place to protect the rights of a breastfeeding mother when feeding her child in public.

The World Health Organization (WHO), along with grassroots non-governmental organisations like the International Baby Food Action Network (IBFAN) have played a large role in encouraging these governmental departments to promote breastfeeding. Under this advice they have developed national breastfeeding strategies, including the promotion of its benefits and attempts to encourage mothers, particularly those under the age of 25, to choose to feed their child with breast milk.

Government campaigns and strategies around the world include:

- National Breastfeeding Week in the United Kingdom.
- The Department of Health and Ageing Breastfeeding Strategy in Australia.
- The National Women's Health Information Center in the United States.
- World Breastfeeding Week.

However, there has been a long, ongoing struggle between corporations promoting artificial substitutes and grassroots organisations and WHO promoting breastfeeding. The International Code of Marketing of Breast-milk Substitutes was developed in 1981 by WHO, but violations have been reported by organisations, including those networked in IBFAN. In particular, Nestlé took three years before it initially implemented the code, and in the late 1990s and early 2000s was again found in violation. Nestlé had previously faced a boycott, beginning in the U.S. but soon spreading through the rest of the world, for marketing practices in the third world (see Nestlé boycott).

=== Breastfeeding in public ===
A breastfeeding mother in public with her baby will often need to breastfeed her child. A baby's need to feed cannot be determined by a set schedule, so legal and social rules about indecent exposure and dress code are often adapted to meet this need. Many laws around the world make public breastfeeding legal and disallow companies from prohibiting it in the workplace, but the reaction of some people to the sight of breastfeeding can make things uncomfortable for those involved. Some breastfeeding mothers feel reluctant to breastfeed in public.

==== United States ====
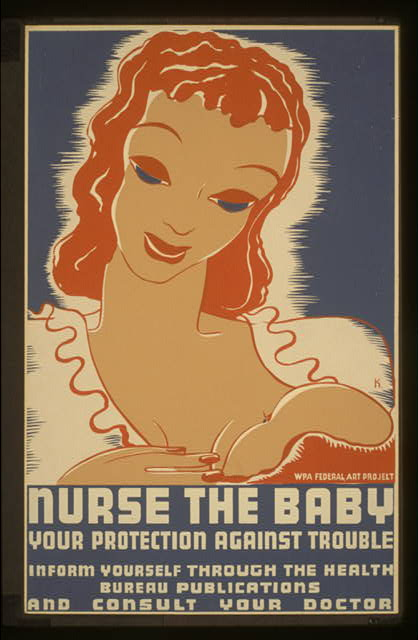
WPA poster, 1938.

A United States House of Representatives appropriations bill (HR 2490) with a breastfeeding amendment was signed into law on September 29, 1999. It stipulated that no government funds may be used to enforce any prohibition on women breastfeeding their children in Federal buildings or on Federal property. Further, U.S. Public Law 106-58 Sec. 647 enacted in 1999, specifically provides that "a woman may breastfeed her child at any location in a Federal building or on Federal property, if the woman and her child are otherwise authorized to be present at the location." A majority of states have enacted state statutes specifically permitting the exposure of the female breast by women breastfeeding infants, or exempting such women from prosecution under applicable statutes, such as those regarding indecent exposure.

Most, but not all, state laws have affirmed the same right in their public places. By June 2006, 36 states had enacted legislation to protect breastfeeding mothers and their children. Laws protecting the right to nurse aim to change attitudes and promote increased incidence and duration of breastfeeding. Recent attempts to codify a child's right to nurse were unsuccessful in West Virginia and other states. Breastfeeding in public is legal in all 50 U.S. states and the District of Columbia. Despite the legal status, a lack of supportive workplace environments and an inability to express milk have been cited by women as barriers for publicly breastfeeding in the United States. Some states have laws protecting a woman's right to breast feed in the workplace. In California, employers must provide a private, non-bathroom space near the employee's work area for lactation that is safe, clean, and equipped with seating, a surface for personal items, and access to electricity. They must also provide access to a nearby sink and refrigeration for milk storage. Small employers with fewer than 50 employees may be exempt if they demonstrate undue hardship but must still make reasonable efforts to provide a private, nearby space.

==== United Kingdom ====
A 2004 UK Department of Health survey found that 84% of people find breastfeeding in public acceptable if it is done discreetly; however, 67% mothers are worried about general opinion being against public breastfeeding.

In legislation, under the UK Equality Act 2010 the legal right to breastfeed is explicitly included in law. It specifies that a business must not discriminate against a woman who is breastfeeding a child of any age in a public place. In Scotland, a bill safeguarding the freedom of women to breastfeed in public was passed in 2005 by the Scottish Parliament. The legislation allows for fines of up to £2500 for preventing breastfeeding in legally permitted places.

==== Ireland ====
The Republic of Ireland Equal Status Act 2000 protects the right to breastfeed in public.

==== Canada ====
In Canada, the Canadian Charter of Rights and Freedoms gives some protection under sex equality. Although Canadian human rights protection does not explicitly include breastfeeding, a 1989 Supreme Court of Canada decision (Brooks v. Safeway Canada) set the precedent for pregnancy as a condition unique to women and that thus discrimination on the basis of pregnancy is a form of sex discrimination. Canadian legal precedent also allows women the right to bare their breasts, just as men may. In British Columbia, the British Columbia Human Rights Commission Policy and Procedures Manual protects the rights of female workers who wish to breastfeed.

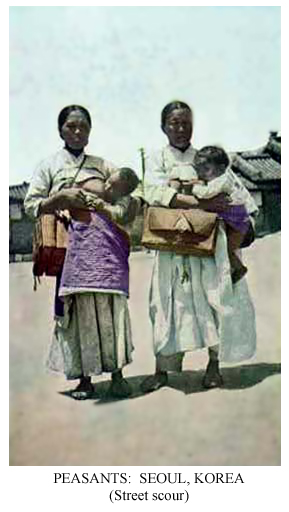
Two early 20th century Korean women breastfeeding their babies while working

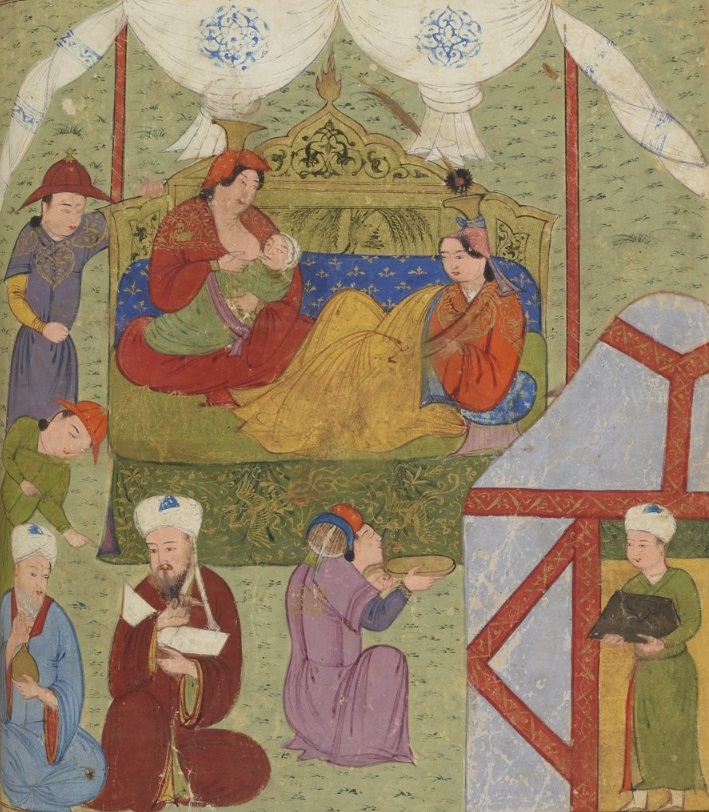
GhazanBeingBreastfed

== Recent global uptake ==
The World Health Organization aims to have at least half of all the mothers worldwide exclusively breastfeeding their infants in the first 6 months of life by the year 2025. The following table shows the uptake of exclusive breastfeeding.

Country	Percentage	Year	Type of feeding
Armenia	0.7%	1993	Exclusive
Armenia	20.8%	1997	Exclusive
Benin	13%	1996	Exclusive
Benin	16%	1997	Exclusive
Bolivia	59%	1989	Exclusive
Bolivia	53%	1994	Exclusive
Central African Republic	4%	1995	Exclusive
Chile	97%	1993	Predominant
Colombia	19%	1993	Exclusive
Colombia	95% (16%)	1995	Predominant (exclusive)
Dominican Republic	14%	1986	Exclusive
Dominican Republic	10%	1991	Exclusive
Ecuador	96%	1994	Predominant
Egypt	68%	1995	Exclusive
Ethiopia	78%	2000	Exclusive
Mali	8%	1987	Exclusive
Mali	12%	1996	Exclusive
Mexico	37.5%	1987	Exclusive
Niger	4%	1992	Exclusive
Nigeria	2%	1992	Exclusive
Pakistan	12%	1988	Exclusive
Pakistan	25%	1992	Exclusive
Poland	1.5%	1988	Exclusive
Poland	17%	1995	Exclusive
Saudi Arabia	55%	1991	Exclusive
Senegal	7%	1993	Exclusive
South Africa	10.4%	1998	Exclusive
Sweden	55%	1992	Exclusive
Sweden	98%	1990	Predominant
Sweden	61%	1993	Exclusive
Thailand	90%	1987	Predominant
Thailand	99% (0.2%)	1993	Predominant (exclusive)
Thailand	4%	1996	Exclusive
United Kingdom	62%	1990	
United Kingdom	66%	1995	
Zambia	13%	1992	Exclusive
Zambia	23%	1996	Exclusive
Zimbabwe	12%	1988	Exclusive
Zimbabwe	17%	1994	Exclusive
Zimbabwe	38.9%	1999	Exclusive

== Alternatives ==
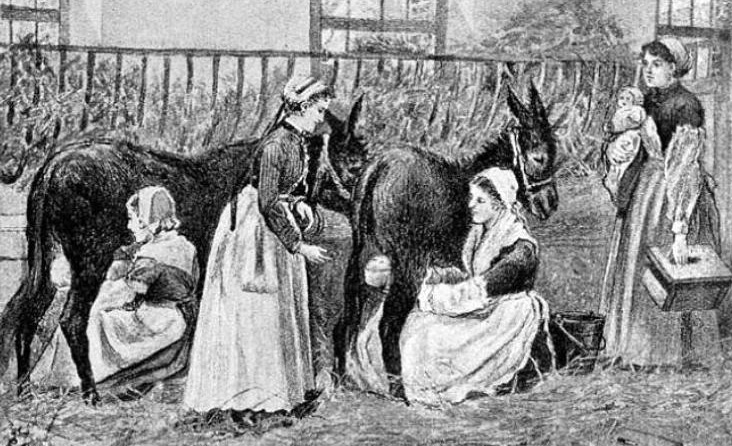
Direct udder nursing 1895

If a mother cannot feed her baby herself, and no wet nurse is available, then other alternatives have to be found, usually animal milk. In addition, once the mother begins to wean her child, the first food is very important.

Feeding vessels dating from about 2000 BC have been found in Egypt. A mother holding a very modern-looking nursing bottle in one hand and a stick, presumably to mix the food, in the other is depicted in a relief found in the ruins of the palace of King Ashurbanipal of Nineveh, who died in 888 BC. Clay feeding vessels were found in graves with infants from the first to fifth centuries AD in Rome.

Valerie Fildes writes in her book Breasts, bottles and babies. A history of Infant Feeding about examples from the 9th to 15th centuries of children getting animal's milk. In the 17th and 18th century Icelandic babies got cow's milk with cream and butter. Human–animal breastfeeding shows that many babies were fed more or less directly from animals, particularly goats.

In 1582, the Italian physician Geronimo Mercuriali wrote in De morbis mulieribus (On the diseases of women) that women generally finished breastfeeding an infant exclusively after the third month and entirely around 13 months of age.

The Wabanaki and other Native American tribal nations of North America made an infant formula from nuts and cornmeal. The feeding of flour or cereal mixed with broth or water became the next alternative in the 19th century, but once again quickly faded. Around this time there became an obvious disparity in the feeding habits of those living in rural areas and those in urban areas. Most likely due to the availability of alternative foods, babies in urban areas were breastfed for a shorter length of time, supplementing the feeds earlier than those in rural areas.

Though first developed by Henri Nestlé in the 1860s, infant formula received a huge boost during the post–World War II baby boom. When business and births decreased, and government strategies in industrialised countries attempted to highlight the benefits of breastfeeding, Nestlé and other such companies focused their aggressive marketing campaigns on developing countries. In 1979 the International Baby Food Action Network (IBFAN) was formed to help raise awareness of such practices as supplementary feeding of new babies with formula and the inappropriate promotion of baby formula, and to help change attitudes that discourage or inhibit mothers from breastfeeding their babies.

== Gallery ==
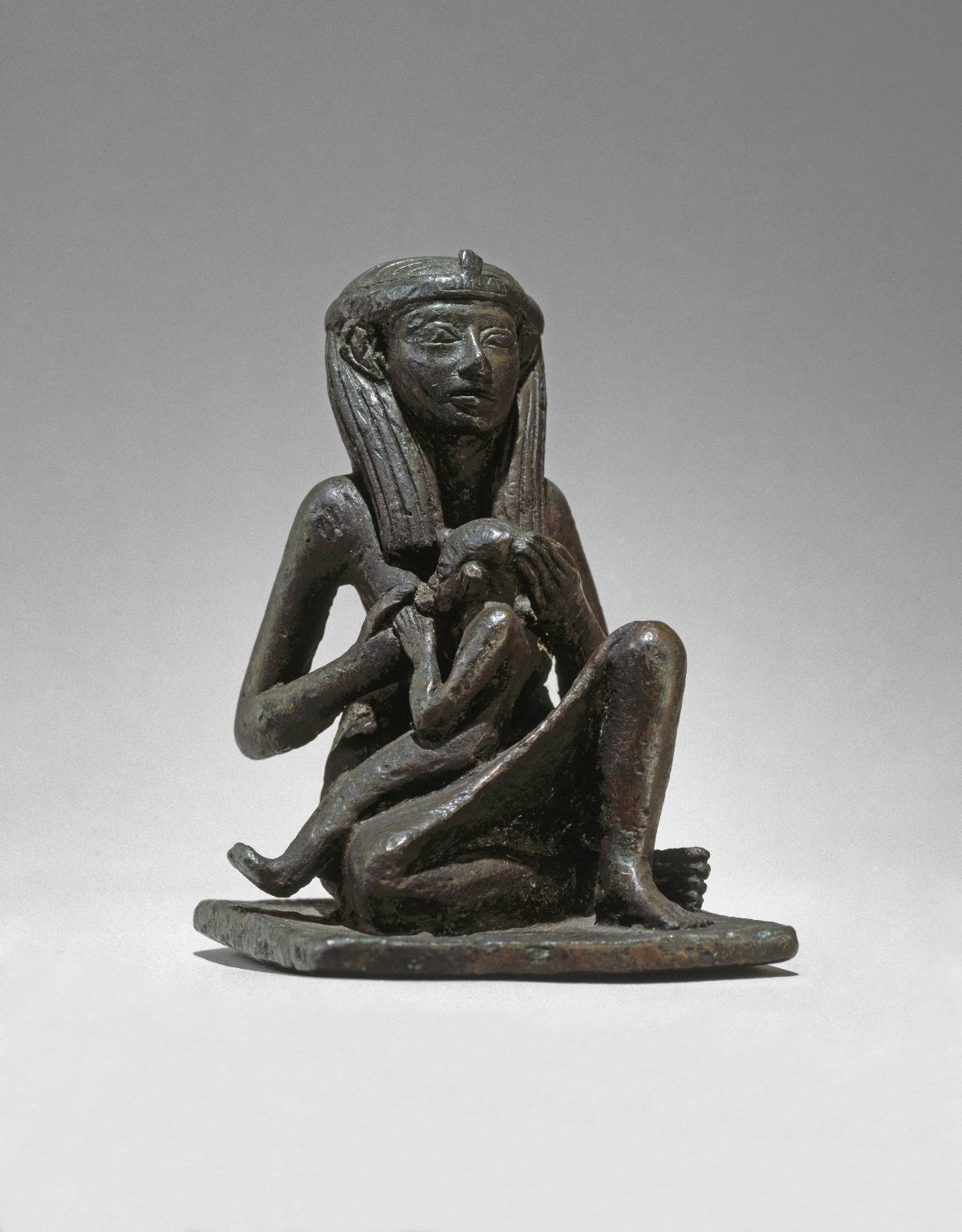
Princess Sobeknakht Suckling a Prince, ca. 1700-after 1630 B.C.E Brooklyn Museum

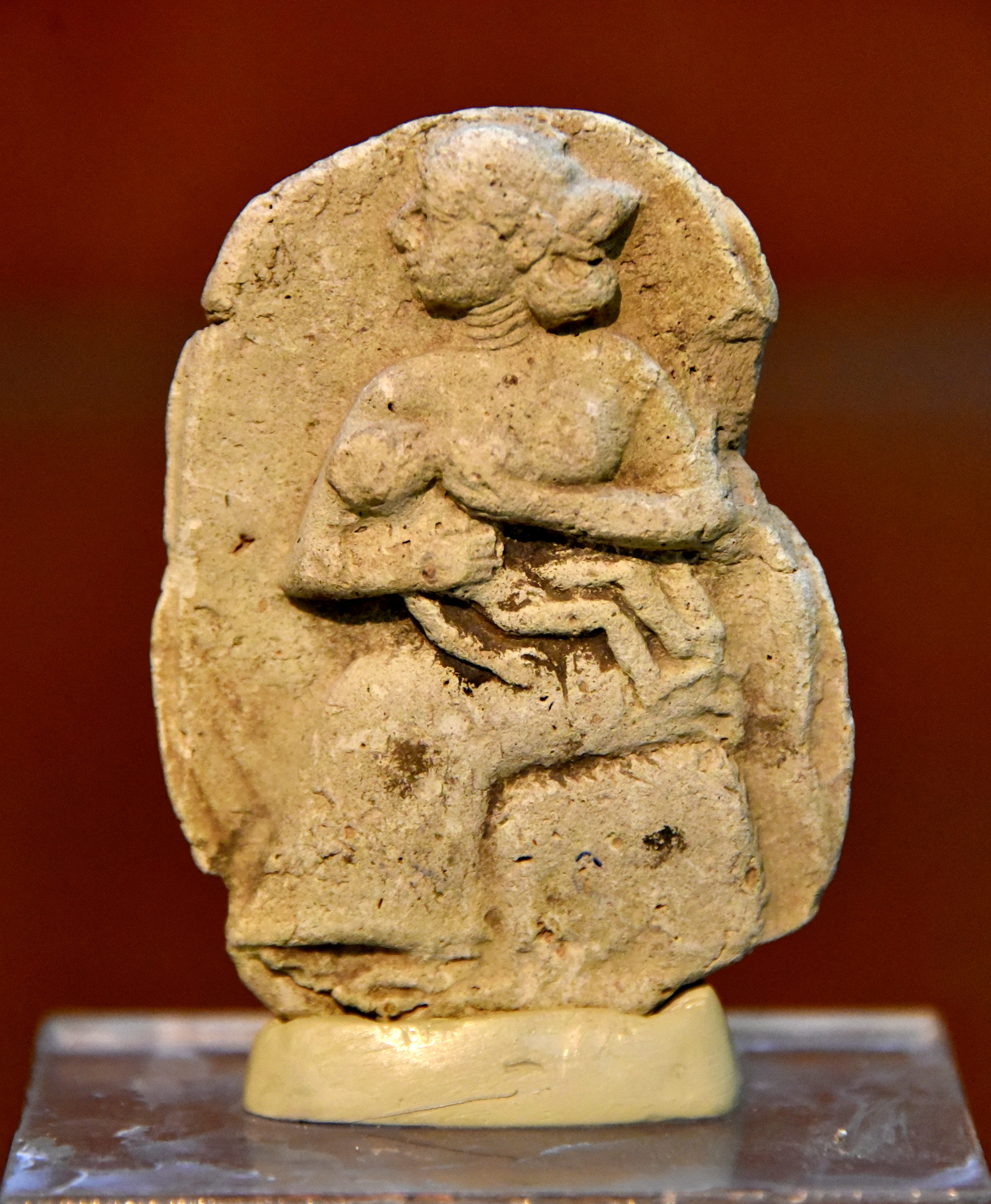
Old-Babylonian plaque of a sitting woman breastfeeding her infant, from Southern Mesopotamia, Iraq

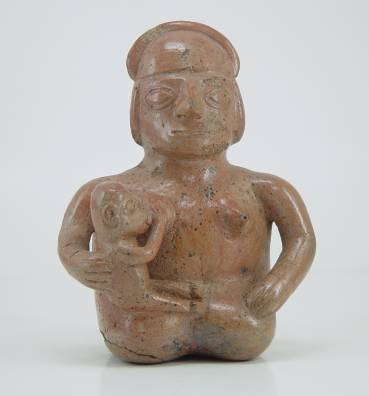
Moche ceramic vessel showing a woman breastfeeding. Larco Museum Collection. Lima-Perú

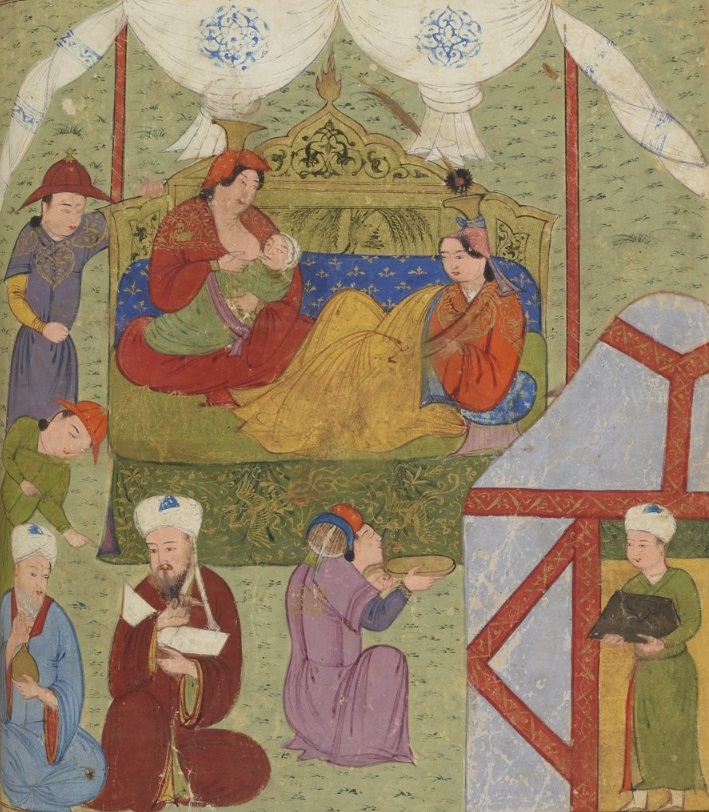
Ilkhanate prince Ghazan being breastfed.

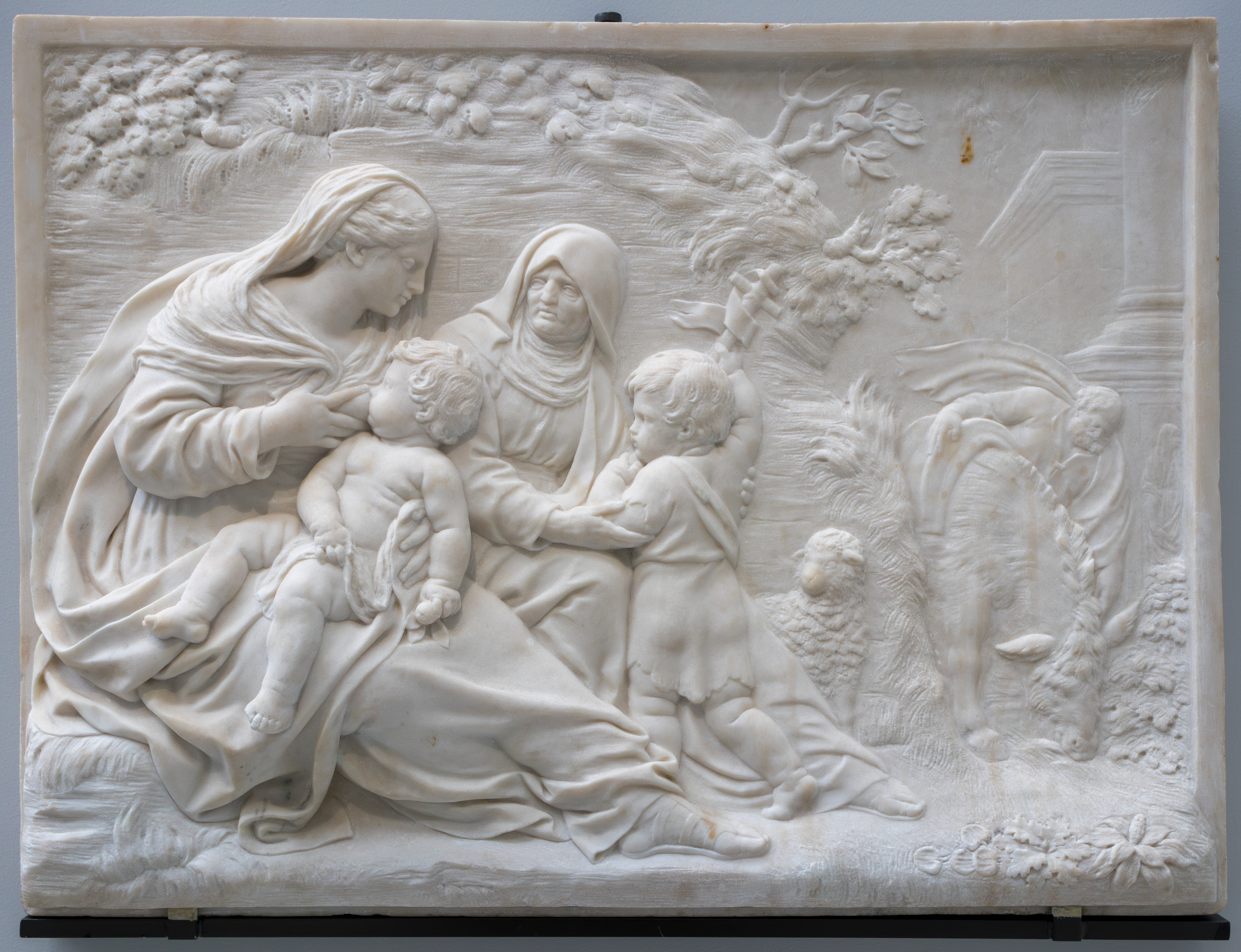
Holy Family by Jacques Sarazin, Louvre Museum

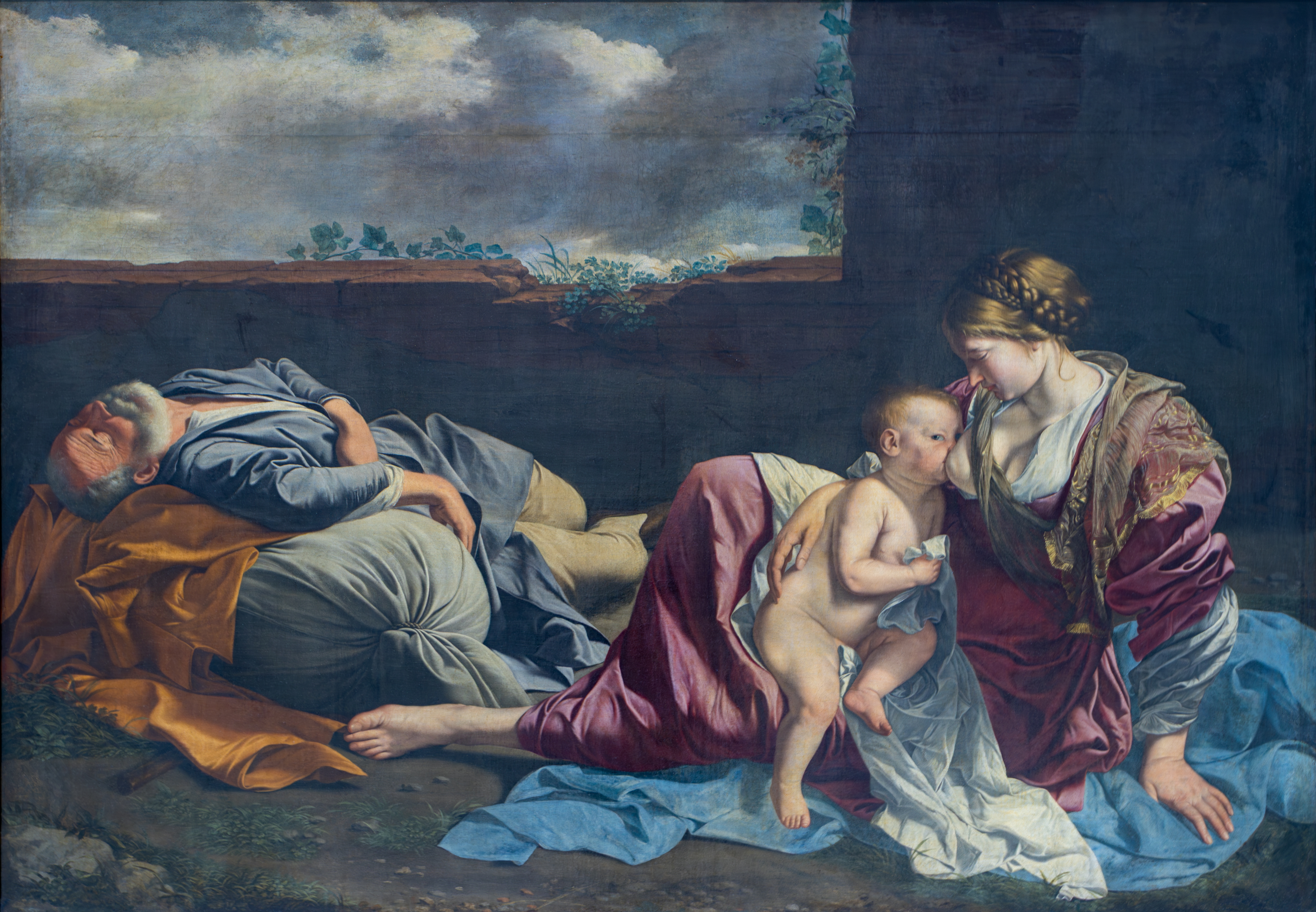
The Rest on the Flight into Egypt by Orazio Gentileschi, Louvre Museum

== See also ==
- Breastfeeding in art
- Nursing chair
- Weaning
- Human milk banking in North America
- Postpartum confinement, a system of recovery from childbirth that allows for mother and baby to learn how to nurse

== Sources ==
- Hard, Robin (2015). Constellation Myths: With Aratus's 'Phaenomena'. Oxford University Press. ISBN 978-0-19-871698-3.
