= Corporate Accountability =

American nonprofit organization

- Formation: Tax-exempt since May 1980; 46 years ago
- Type: 501(c)(3)
- Headquarters: Boston
- Revenue: 7,188,421 USD (2024)
- Expenses: 8,915,015 USD (2024)
- Website: corporateaccountability.org

Corporate Accountability (formerly INFACT, Corporate Accountability International) is a non-profit organization, founded in 1977. Their campaign headquarters are in Boston, Massachusetts, and they have offices in Oakland, California; Seattle, Washington; and Bogotá, Colombia.

== History ==
Since 1977, Corporate Accountability has waged a number of high-profile campaigns to protect public health, the environment and democracy from abuse by transnational corporations.

From 1977 to 1986, the Infant Formula Campaign and Nestlé Boycott brought about significant reforms in the marketing of infant formula in developing countries. The work of Corporate Accountability International and allies contributed to the passage of the World Health Organization's International Code of Marketing of Breast-milk Substitutes in 1981.

From 1984 to 1993, the Nuclear Weaponmakers Campaign and General Electric (GE) Boycott cost the company over $19 million in lost medical equipment sales and $100 million in overall sales. In 1991, Corporate Accountability International commissioned the Academy Award-winning documentary Deadly Deception: General Electric, Nuclear Weapons, and Our Environment that juxtaposed "GE's rosy 'We Bring Good Things To Life' commercials with the stories of workers and neighbors whose lives have been devastated by the company's involvement in building and testing nuclear bombs."

Corporate Accountability's Think Outside the Bottle Campaign has been supported by Salt Lake City mayor Rocky Anderson, who has also begun his own “Knock Out Bottled Water” website, San Francisco mayor Gavin Newsom, and more. The campaign also played a major role in the July 2007 decision by PepsiCo to change the label on its Aquafina bottled water to more plainly state it is sourced from public water.

In April 2010, they began calling for the 'retirement' of Ronald McDonald, saying the mascot fuels childhood obesity.

In 2014, Corporate Accountability launched a climate campaign.
