= Water bottle nipple adapter =

A water bottle nipple adapter is a device that allows a standard baby bottle nipple and cap to be attached to a beverage bottle, such as a plastic water bottle. The adapter allow liquid like formula, water, or juice, to pass from the beverage bottle through the nipple while providing a seal between the bottle, adapter, and nipple assembly.

The water bottle nipple adapter was invented by the host of "Cheaters", Tommy Habeeb. The inspiration comes from when he was out with his children on a hot day and his infant son suddenly needs to drink water. He started to think to of a way for a baby to drink water without using baby bottle.

== Design ==
One patented design consists of a generally cylindrical base with a passage through it for fluid flow. A section of the base is inserted into the opening of a beverage bottle and secured by a friction or press fit. An annular sealing disc engages the internal threads of a standard baby bottle cap, while a lip near the upper end of the adapter contacts the inner surface of the nipple to provide an additional seal.

== Patent History ==
A United States patent application title Nipple adapter for beverage bottle was filed on July 16, 2006. The patent names Gina Marie Almonte as the inventor and was granted on January 27,2009 as U.S Patent 7,481,324.
