= TALC =

Talc is a mineral composed of magnesium silicate.

TALC may refer to:

- The American Lutheran Church, a Christian Protestant denomination in the United States
- Shaw PPV, a Canadian pay-per-view television network whose French language channels use the branding TALC
- Teaching-aids at Low Cost or TALC a British charitable development agency that works to improve access to healthcare in low income countries
- Transportation and Land Use Coalition, a non-profit organization in the San Francisco Bay Area, United States
