= Operation Stork Speed =

United States government nutrition program

Operation Stork Speed is a United States government nutrition program started in 2025. A joint project between the HHS and FDA, it will help mothers provide better quality and safe baby formula for their infants.
