= Gabrielle Palmer =

British non-fiction author, nutritionist, lecturer and campaigner

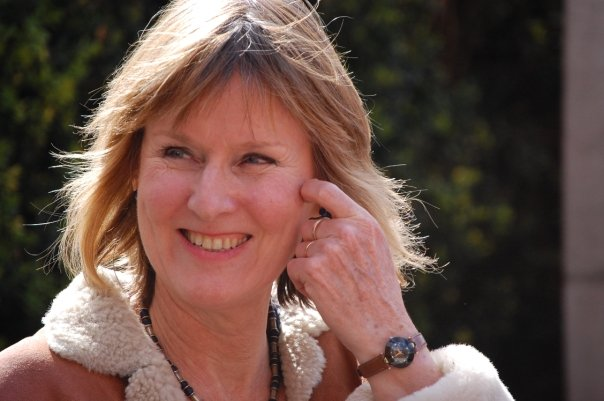
- Palmer in 2011
- Born: 3 March 1947 (age 79); London, England
- Education: University of Manchester
- Occupations: Nutritionist, author, campaigner
- Children: 2
- Writing career
- Genre: Non fiction
- Subjects: Public health, nutrition, breastfeeding
- Notable work: The Politics of Breastfeeding

Gabrielle Palmer (born 3 March 1947) is a British author and nutritionist who has campaigned for decades against breastmilk substitutes globally and in support of breastfeeding. She is the author of the book The Politics of Breastfeeding.

== Childhood and family life ==
Born in St Thomas's Hospital, Palmer spent her childhood in South London. She attended the Convent of Our Lady of Sion, Bayswater, London, from 1958 to 1965, and then studied at Manchester University (BA General Arts, 1966 to 1969), where she met John. They married in 1968 and in the early 1970s she became a National Childbirth Trust breastfeeding counsellor.

== Early professional life ==
Palmer's professional life began as a secondary school teacher (1969 to 1976) and then she worked as a Save the Children, Schools and Universities Organiser 1977 to 1980. The family moved to Mozambique in 1981 where Palmer volunteered (with International Voluntary Service) working in nutrition and education within various government institutions in Maputo including in an orphanage and hospitals. She ran classes for mothers of malnourished children to support complementary feeding classes using locally available foods and taught nutrition to student health workers. She observed that mothers can sustain breastfeeding, despite poor food intake.

She returned to the UK to study for an MSc Human Nutrition at the London School of Hygiene and Tropical Medicine (1985). She is recognised as an authority on supporting breastfeeding and a campaigner to stop unethical promotion of breastmilk substitutes.

By taking away women’s primordial right to sustain their own children with their own milk, through the destruction of traditional knowledge and the reorganisation of work processes, dependency on a powerful dominant group is created.

— Gabrielle Palmer in The Politics of Breastfeeding

== Campaigning work ==
In 1974, when her two children were still small, Palmer read The Baby Killer, an influential booklet by Mike Muller published by the charity War on Want highlighting the aggressive promotion of breastmilk substitutes in regions where their use led to infection and death of infants. Palmer resolved to work against the unethical promotion of artificial milks over breastfeeding. She was instrumental in establishing the campaigning group Baby Milk Action (International Baby Food Action Network, IBFAN), based in Cambridge, UK, and of which she is still a patron. This work with Baby Milk Action included coordinating the UK boycott of Nestle products, raising awareness of the issue and of the WHO/UNICEF International Code of Marketing of Breast-milk Substitutes in UK colleges, schools and institutions as well as engaging the attention of politicians and public figures.

In 1999, she was appointed HIV and Infant Feeding Officer in UNICEF HQ, New York. From 2001 to 2007 she worked as a lecturer and tutor at the London School of Hygiene and Tropical Medicine as well as simultaneously serving on UNICEF UK Baby Friendly Initiative Designation Committee, and continuing various freelance consultancy work. She has worked and run short training courses for health professionals in 46 countries including Mongolia, Libya and North Korea. She also served as a managing trustee for Health Books International when it was known as Teaching-aids at Low Cost, TALC. She continues to campaign and her most recent work was published by the Association for Improvements in the Maternity Services.

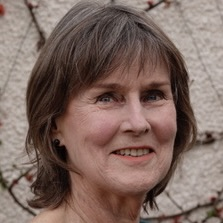

== Lecturing and teaching ==
Palmer remained busy with campaigning, designing training courses, teaching, consultancies and writing. From 1991 to 1997, she was co-director of the international short course, Breastfeeding: practice and policy at the Institute of Child Health, London. During these years she contributed to the development of the WHO/UNICEF transferable courses designed for the ‘cascade’ training of trainers, globally. These included, Breastfeeding Counselling: a training Course, field testing the Chinese version in Taiwan in 1997, the UNICEF training course on the International Code of Marketing of Breast-milk Substitutes and the WHO/UNICEF HIV and Infant Feeding course.

== Books ==
In 1988, Pandora Press (Unwin Hyman) published Palmer's first book, The Politics of Breastfeeding. It proved influential and became required reading on courses for midwives and others. It underwent a minor update when it was subsequently republished by HarperCollins in 1993 and a major revision for the Pinter & Martin edition that launched in 2009 and was reprinted in the same year, as well as in 2011 and 2016. This updated edition contains a new chapter entitled "Your Generous Donations Could do More Harm Than Good", which is being used by the Professor of Nutrition at Columbia University to educate her students on nutrition in emergencies. Palmer's key scholarly contributions and books are:

- Palmer, Gabrielle (1988). The Politics of Breastfeeding: when breasts are bad for business. Pandora Press. ISBN 9780863582202.
- Baby Milk: Destruction of a World Resource. CIIR. 1993. ISBN 9781852871178.
- Palmer, Gabrielle; Kemp, Saskia (1996). "Breastfeeding Promotion and the Role of the Professional Midwife". In Murray, Susan F (ed.). International Perspectives on Midwifery: Baby Friendly Mother Friendly. Mosby, UK. ISBN 0-7234-2123-4.
- Palmer, Gabrielle (2003). "Feminism and Breastfeeding". In Stewart, Mary (ed.). Pregnancy, Birth and Maternity Care: Feminist Perspectives. Elsevier, UK. ISBN 978-0750656016.
- Palmer, Gabrielle (2011). Complementary Feeding: Nutrition, Culture and Politics. Pinter & Martin, UK. ISBN 9781905177424.
- Palmer, Gabrielle (2011). Polityka karmeienia piersiq. Translated by Anna Rogozinska. mamania, Warszawa. ISBN 9781905177424.
- Palmer, Gabrielle (2016). Why the Politics of Breast feeding Matter. Pinter & Martin, UK. p. 144. ISBN 978-1-78066-525-2.
- Palmer, Gabrielle (2023). Warum Stillen Politisch Ist. Translated by Ingeborg Hagedorn. Magas Verlag. ISBN 978-3-949537-00-4.
