= 1977 Nestlé boycott =

Boycott of Nestlé corporation

A boycott against the Swiss-based multinational food and drink processing corporation Nestlé was launched in the United States on 4 July 1977. The boycott expanded into Europe in the early 1980s and was prompted by concerns about Nestlé's aggressive marketing of infant formulas as substitutes for breast milk, particularly in underdeveloped countries. The boycott has been cancelled and renewed because of the business practices of Nestlé and other substitute manufacturers monitored by the International Baby Food Action Network (IBFAN). Breast milk is the best nutrition source for infants, and this has long been understood as a settled scientific consensus by public health experts and paediatric specialists. The World Health Organization (WHO) recommends infants to be exclusively breastfed for the first six months of their lives, and nutritional gaps must be filled if breastfeeding is not possible.

The Nestlé boycott can be seen as special in a sense that it linked human rights regulations and humanitarian activism with corporate responsibility and market capitalism. One analysis argued consumers were basically acting as global citizens by aiding people in need outside their close communities, in this case mothers in developing countries, "using the marketplace not as a way of generating revenue, but rather as a space for protest".

== Baby milk controversy ==
The International Baby Food Action Network and Save the Children have stated that the promotion of infant formula over breastfeeding leads to health problems and deaths among infants in less economically developed countries. There are three problems that can arise when poor mothers in developing countries switch to formula as well as one list of benefits of breast milk:

- Sanitation:
  - Formula must be mixed with water, which is often impure or not potable in poor countries, leading to disease in vulnerable infants. Due to low literacy rates in developing nations, many mothers are not aware of the sanitation methods necessary to prepare bottles. Even mothers able to read in their native language may be unable to read the language in which sterilization directions are written.
  - Although some mothers can understand the sanitation standards required, they often do not have the means to perform them: fuel to boil water, electric (or other reliable) light to enable sterilisation at night. UNICEF estimates that a formula-fed child living in disease-ridden and unhygienic conditions is between six and 25 times more likely to die of diarrhea and four times more likely to die of pneumonia than a breastfed child.
- Nutritional value:
  - Many poor mothers use less formula for the baby than is required, in order to make a container of formula last longer. As a result, some infants receive inadequate nutrition from weak solutions of formula.
  - Breast milk has many natural benefits lacking in formula. Nutrients and antibodies are passed to the baby while hormones are released into the mother's body. Breastfed babies are protected, in varying degrees, from a number of illnesses, including diarrhea, bacterial meningitis, gastroenteritis, ear infection, and respiratory infection. Breast milk contains the right amount of the nutrients essential for neuronal (brain and nerve) development. The bond between baby and mother can be strengthened during breastfeeding. Frequent and exclusive breastfeeding can also delay the return of fertility, which can help women in developing countries to space their births. The World Health Organization recommends that, in the majority of cases, babies should be exclusively breast fed for the first six months, and then given complementary foods in addition to breastfeeding for up to two years or beyond.
- Preserving milk supply:
  - The practice of relying on free formula in maternity wards frequently means the mother loses the ability to make her own milk and must buy formula (as stated in the following paragraph).

Advocacy groups and charities have accused Nestlé of unethical methods of promoting infant formula over breast milk to poor mothers in developing countries. For example, IBFAN claims that Nestlé distributes free formula samples to hospitals and maternity wards; after leaving the hospital, the formula is no longer free, but because the supplementation has interfered with lactation, the family must continue to buy the formula. IBFAN also alleges that Nestlé uses "humanitarian aid" to create markets, does not label its products in a language appropriate to the countries where they are sold, and offers gifts and sponsorship to influence health workers to promote its products. The company not only made use of mass media promotion (e.g. billboards and posters) and sample distributions, they also had sales people dressed as so-called "milk nurses" to visit mothers in hospital and at their home to praise formula and its benefits. Nestlé justified its actions by rejecting the responsibility for e.g. the lack of clean water in many developing countries and further argued with freedom of consumer choice, which in the company's opinion allows for formula products to be sold in developing markets.

== History ==
=== 1970s ===
Nestlé's marketing strategy was first written about in New Internationalist magazine in 1973 and in a booklet called The Baby Killer, published by the British NGO War On Want in 1974. The report helped raise concern over marketing practices in developing countries and served as the starting point of the so-called Baby Killer campaign. Nestlé started a legal suit in Switzerland when the booklet was published in German language entitled "Nestlé kills Babies". After a two-year trial, the court found in favour of Nestlé because they could not be held responsible for the infant deaths 'in terms of criminal law'. Because the defendants were only fined 300 Swiss Francs (just over US$400, adjusted for inflation), and Judge Jürg Sollberger commented that Nestlé "must modify its publicity methods fundamentally", TIME magazine declared this a "moral victory" for the defendants. This led to similar court challenges brought against other milk companies in the U.S. spearheaded by the Roman Catholic order Sisters of the Precious Blood in conjunction with the Interfaith Center on Corporate Responsibility.

The widespread publicity led to the launch of the boycott in Minneapolis, USA, by the Infant Formula Action Coalition (INFACT) and this boycott soon spread to Australia, Canada, New Zealand, and Europe as more and more people were concerned by Nestlé's marketing practices to promote baby formula instead of breast milk, especially in the developing world. In May 1978, the US Senate held a public hearing into the promotion of breast milk substitutes in developing countries and joined calls for a Marketing Code. In 1979, WHO and UNICEF hosted an international meeting that called for the development of an international code of marketing, as well as action on other fronts to improve infant and early child feeding practices. The International Baby Food Action Network was formed by six of the campaigning groups at this meeting.

=== 1980s and 1990s ===
In 1981, the 34th World Health Assembly (WHA), the decision-making body for WHO, adopted Resolution WHA34.22 which includes the International Code of Marketing of Breast-milk Substitutes. The Code covers infant formula and other milk products, foods and beverages, when marketed or otherwise represented to be suitable as a partial or total replacement of breast milk. It bans the promotion of breast milk substitutes and gives health workers the responsibility for advising parents. It limits manufacturing companies to the provision of scientific and factual information to health workers and sets forth labeling requirements. The US voted against the adoption.

In 1984, boycott coordinators met with Nestlé, which agreed to create an independent agency, the Nestlé Infant Formula Audit Commission (IFAC), and to sign an agreement where they pledged to fully implement the Code. The boycott was then officially suspended. In 1988, a second phase of the boycott started as IBFAN alleged that formula companies were flooding health facilities in the developing world with free and low-cost supplies, and the boycott was relaunched the following year.

In May 1999, a ruling against Nestlé was issued by the UK Advertising Standards Authority (ASA). Nestlé claimed in an anti-boycott advertisement that it markets infant formula "ethically and responsibly". The ASA found that Nestlé could not support this nor other claims in the face of evidence provided by the campaigning group Baby Milk Action.

=== 2000s onwards ===
In November 2000, the European Parliament invited IBFAN, UNICEF, and Nestlé to present evidence to a public hearing before the Development and Cooperation Committee. Evidence was presented by the IBFAN group from Pakistan and UNICEF's legal officer commented on Nestlé's failure to bring its policies into line with the World Health Assembly Resolutions. Nestlé declined an invitation to attend, claiming scheduling conflicts, although it sent a representative of the auditing company it had commissioned to produce a report on its Pakistan operation.

Throughout the years, Nestlé has claimed that it is in full compliance with the International Code. In 2001, for example, Peter Brabeck-Letmathe, at the time CEO of Nestlé, stated: "we also carry out annual audits on WHO Code compliance with a sample of Nestlé companies, and we investigate any substantiated claims made by those who believe we have broken the Code.... If we find that the Code has been deliberately violated, we take disciplinary action." The company maintained that many of the allegations are unsubstantiated, out of date, or use IBFAN's own non-standard interpretation of the Code.

In May 2011, the debate over Nestlé's unethical marketing of infant formula was relaunched in the Asia-Pacific region. Nineteen leading Laos-based international NGOs, including Save the Children, Oxfam, CARE International, Plan International and World Vision have launched a boycott of Nestlé and written an open letter to the company. Among other unethical practices, the NGOs criticised the lack of labelling in Laos and the provision of incentives to doctors and nurses to promote the use of infant formula. An independent audit of Nestlé's marketing practices in Laos was commissioned by Nestlé and carried out by Bureau Veritas in late 2011. The audit found that "the requirements of the WHO Code and Lao PDR Decree are well embedded throughout the business", but that "promotional materials in 4% of the retail outlets visited" violated either the Lao PDR Decree or the WHO Code.

In a 2018 study, the National Bureau of Economic Research (NBER) estimated that 10,870,000 infants had died between 1960 and 2015 as a result of Nestlé baby formula used by "mothers [in low and middle-income countries] without clean water sources", with deaths peaking at 212,000 in 1981.

In 2024, a report by Swiss nonprofit Public Eye and IBFAN stated that Nestlé adds more sugar to baby food sold in lower- and middle-income countries compared to healthier versions sold in affluent markets.

== Current status ==
The boycott is still present as of 2026. Nestlé also officially states on their website that it "follow[s] the WHO Code as implemented by national governments everywhere in the world". The company states that it updates its marketing policy, that it reports on compliance on an annual basis, and that it set up a whistleblower scheme. Nestlé states that it is "committed not to interfere with mothers' desire to breastfeed and to protect them from inappropriate marketing practices by actively supporting breastfeeding". Critics state that Nestlé continues to be accused of malpractice.

Data from 2020 indicates that 136 WHO member states had established some legal measures related to the Code from 1981, however, only few fully reflect the Code. The report indicates a gap in many countries' legislation. IBFAN continues to be an international network, encompassing more than 270 groups in over 160 countries who push for implementations of the marketing of breast-milk substitutes Code and relevant resolutions. The overall goal remains: marketing baby food should not have negative impacts on infants' health.

In 2024, a new controversy arose when Nestlé was criticized for adding sugar and honey to infant milk and cereal products in certain countries.

In September 2026, The Food Safety and Standards Authority of India (FSSAI) has initiated legal action against Nestle India over alleged non-compliance involving its NAN Excella Pro Stage 1 and Lactogen Pro 1 infant nutrition products, over their promotion and claims on e-commerce platforms FSSAI flags Nestle infant products over false promotional claims, biotin levels

== In the media ==
An episode of the TV show The Mark Thomas Comedy Product produced by the British Channel Four in 1999 investigated the boycott and Nestlé's practices concerning baby milk. Mark Thomas attempted to find evidence for claims against Nestlé and to speak to heads of the company. In one portion of the show he received a tin of baby milk from Mozambique. All instructions are in English. 33 languages and dialects are recognised in Mozambique. Portuguese is the official language. However, only about 30% of the population can speak it.

In 2001, comedian Robert Newman and actress Emma Thompson called for a boycott of the Perrier Comedy Award, because Perrier is owned by Nestlé. An alternative competition called the Tap Water Awards was set up the following year.

In 2002, authors Germaine Greer and Jim Crace withdrew from the Hay Festival in protest over Nestlé's sponsorship of the event.

A 2007 article in The Guardian highlighted aggressive marketing practices by Nestlé in Bangladesh.

The 2014 film Tigers is based on 1997 Pakistan Nestle infant formula controversy.

== See also ==
- H2NO – an upselling campaign by Coca-Cola to dissuade consumers from ordering tap water drinks at restaurants
- Controversies of Nestlé
