= Health Books International =

International non-profit organization

Health Books International (formerly Teaching-aids at Low Cost [TALC])
- Founded: 1965
- Type: Non-governmental organization
- Purpose: textbooks, health, water, sanitation, environment, health promotion
- Headquarters: 27a Albert Street, Rugby, Warwickshire
- Location: UK
- Region served: International
- Key people: Andrea Johnson, head of publishing at Practical Action Publishing
- Website: www.healthbooksinternational.org

Health Books International (formerly Teaching-aids at Low Cost or TALC) is an international non-profit organisation that was set up in Britain in 1965 by Professor David Morley (paediatrician). Until it merged with Practical Action publishing, HBI was registered with the Charity Commission and also with Companies House in the UK. In January 2017 the charity changed its name from TALC to Health Books International.

== Vision and history ==
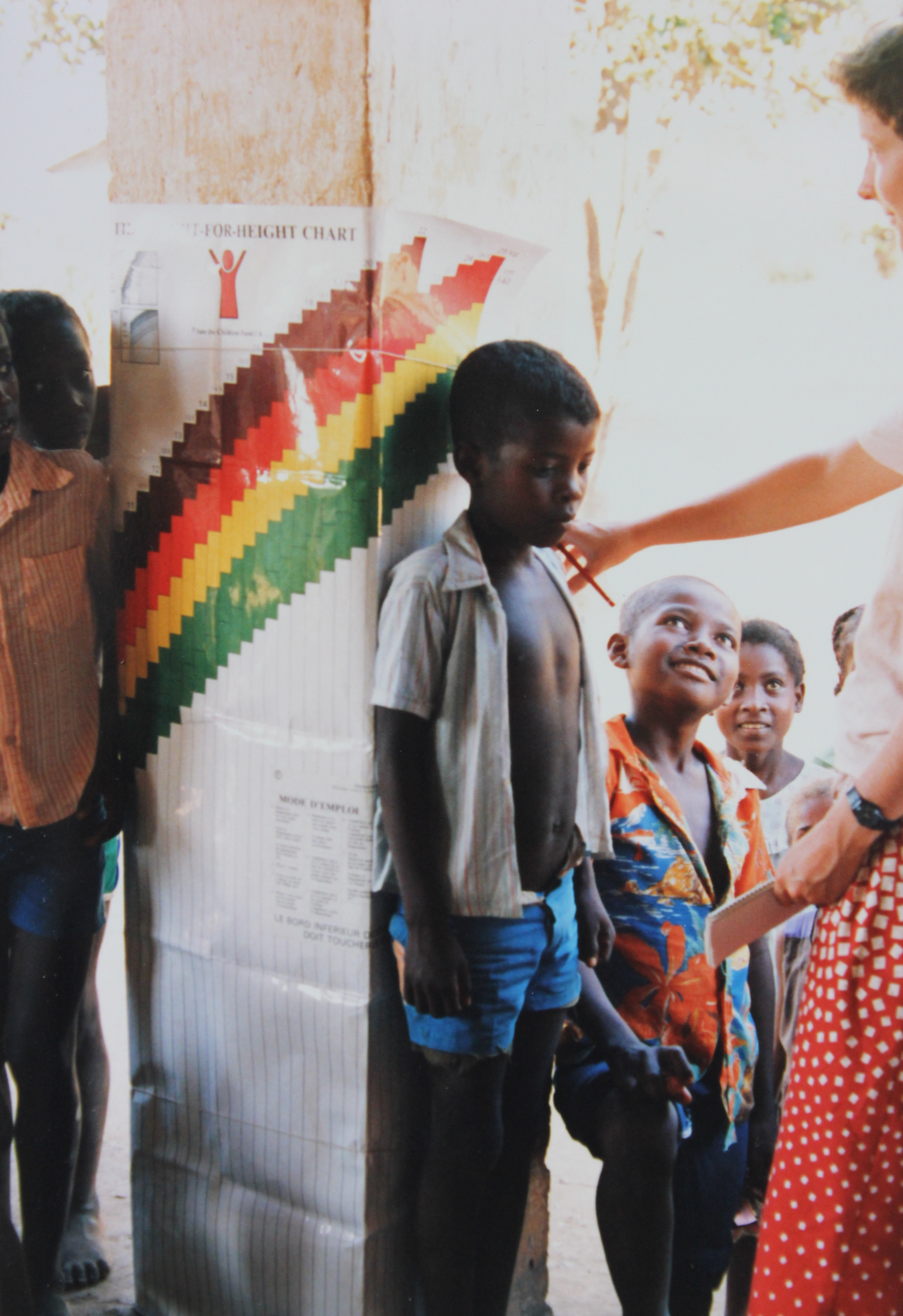
Ht / wt chart supplied by TALC in use in Madagascar, 1986

Teaching-aids at Low Cost was formed by Professor Morley CBE, MD, FRCP when he was lecturer at the Institute of Child Health, London. He transformed the approach to childhood illness in resource-poor, tropical countries. He also responded to many requests from overseas students for teaching equipment to use in their own countries in an innovative way. His vision was to provide books about health and also teaching materials cheaply to healthcare workers and others in low income settings. Originally TALC compiled 35mm slide sets with accompanying notes that clinical teachers could use to illustrate their lectures, showing, for example, what a measles or smallpox rash looks like.

TALC also supplied (and as HBI continues to supply) other materials. These included special spoons for measuring out the correct proportions of sugar and salt to be given to children as oral rehydration drinks, as well as measuring tapes to assess malnutrition. In the early days much of the work of packing up materials and posting them abroad was done by volunteers based in Saint Albans, Hertfordshire.

The charity fostered relationships between practising clinicians working both in the South and in industrialised nations. Experts who had worked in resource-poor environments including Professor Sandy Cairncross, Gabrielle Palmer, Jane Wilson-Howarth and others joined as managing trustees. Health and engineering specialists with experience of working in low income settings ensured that supplies are arranged according to need and utility. One simple example of this is the mid upper arm circumference tapes that are used for rapid diagnosis of malnutrition. These are now plasticised to give them longer lives in harsh situations.

== Current work ==
In 2017 the charity moved its base back to St. Albans having been in Harpenden, Hertfordshire for some years. With the stampede towards electronic publications and the difficulty of distributing heavy items, many “experts” stated that the days of transporting books to the tropics were long gone. However practical guides about clinical medicine, health training materials and information on environmental sanitation for use in low income, non-industrialised countries are still needed. Materials deemed by some as outdated including flannelgraphs and laminated charts and posters suitable for illiterate target audiences are still in demand. HBI continues to distribute these at minimal cost, as well as oral rehydration spoons and mid-upper arm circumference malnutrition assessment tapes. According to the Chair's Report of 2015, over the course of its 50-year history TALC/HBI has sent over 10 million books, photographic slides and accessories to thousands of healthcare workers in low-income countries and fragile states. In addition, HBI supply grass roots organisations like PHASE (Practical Help Achieving Self Empowerment) with low cost materials including colour chart cards for rapid diagnosis of anaemia.

== Books published ==
In 2012 HBI facilitated the publication of Where There is No Doctor in the Portuguese language, and this is distributed in Mozambique and other low income countries where Portuguese is spoken. In addition, A Community Guide to Environmental Health (original published by Hesperian) has also been translated into Portuguese. Such books are available at production cost. HBI also assisted the British Medical Association international department distribute books donated by the BMA. February 2016 saw the launch of a substantial and comprehensive medical textbook Pneumonia in Children. TALC assisted with the tasks of editing and publication of this important work.

== Governance ==
The charity operated with a minimal number of paid staff and several volunteers who packed and dispatched books and teaching materials but also helped on many other levels. Trustees were drawn from local business in Hertfordshire and from experienced clinicians and others who had extensive experience working in low-income settings or in disaster relief. On 29 May 2019 HBI trustees signed a merger with Practical Action Publishing and moved operations to Rugby.
