= International Baby Food Action Network =

The International Baby Food Action Network, IBFAN, consists of public interest groups working around the world to reduce infant and young child morbidity and mortality. IBFAN aims to improve the health and well-being of babies and young children, their mothers and their families through the protection, promotion and support of breastfeeding and optimal infant feeding practices. IBFAN works for universal and full implementation of the International Code of Marketing of Breast-milk Substitutes and Resolutions.

IBFAN was set up in 1979 due to the efforts of various individuals including Gabrielle Palmer through UNICEF and the WHO. The first analysis of Nestlé's marketing strategy was published in the magazine New Internationalist in 1973 and in the book The Baby Killer, published by the English non-governmental organisation War On Want in 1974. Nestlé sued the publisher of the German translation (Third World Action Group) for libel. After a two-year trial, the publisher was convicted on the grounds that Nestlé could not be held responsible for infant deaths under criminal law. But since the defence was only fined 300 Swiss francs, and judge Jürg Sollberger pointed out that Nestlé needed to fundamentally change its advertising methods, Time magazine wrote that it was a moral victory for the defence.

In 1981, the 34th General Assembly of the World Health Organization adopted resolution WHA34.22, which included the International Code of Marketing of Breast-milk Substitutes. The Code contains restrictions on the marketing of breast-milk substitutes, such as infant formula, to ensure that mothers are not discouraged from breast-feeding and that substitutes are used safely when necessary. The code also covers feeding bottles and teats. It also contains recommendations on the labelling of infant formula and other breast-milk substitutes.

In 1998 IBFAN received the Right Livelihood Award. The RLA Jury has honoured IBFAN “for its committed and effective campaigning over nearly twenty years for the rights of mothers to choose to breastfeed their babies, in the full knowledge of the health benefits of breastmilk, and free from the commercial pressure and misinformation with which companies promote breastmilk substitutes.”

IBFAN's principles are:

1. The right of infants everywhere to have the highest level of health.
2. The right of families, and in particular women and children, to have enough nutritious food.
3. The right of women to breastfeed and to make informed choices about infant feeding.
4. The right of women to full support for successful breastfeeding and for sound infant feeding practices.
5. The right of all people to health services which meet basic needs.
6. The right of health workers and consumers to health care systems which are free of commercial pressures.
7. The right of people to organise in international solidarity to secure changes which protect and promote basic health.

== See also ==
- Breastfeeding promotion
- La leche league
- Breast milk
