= Infant formula =

Manufactured food designed for feeding infants

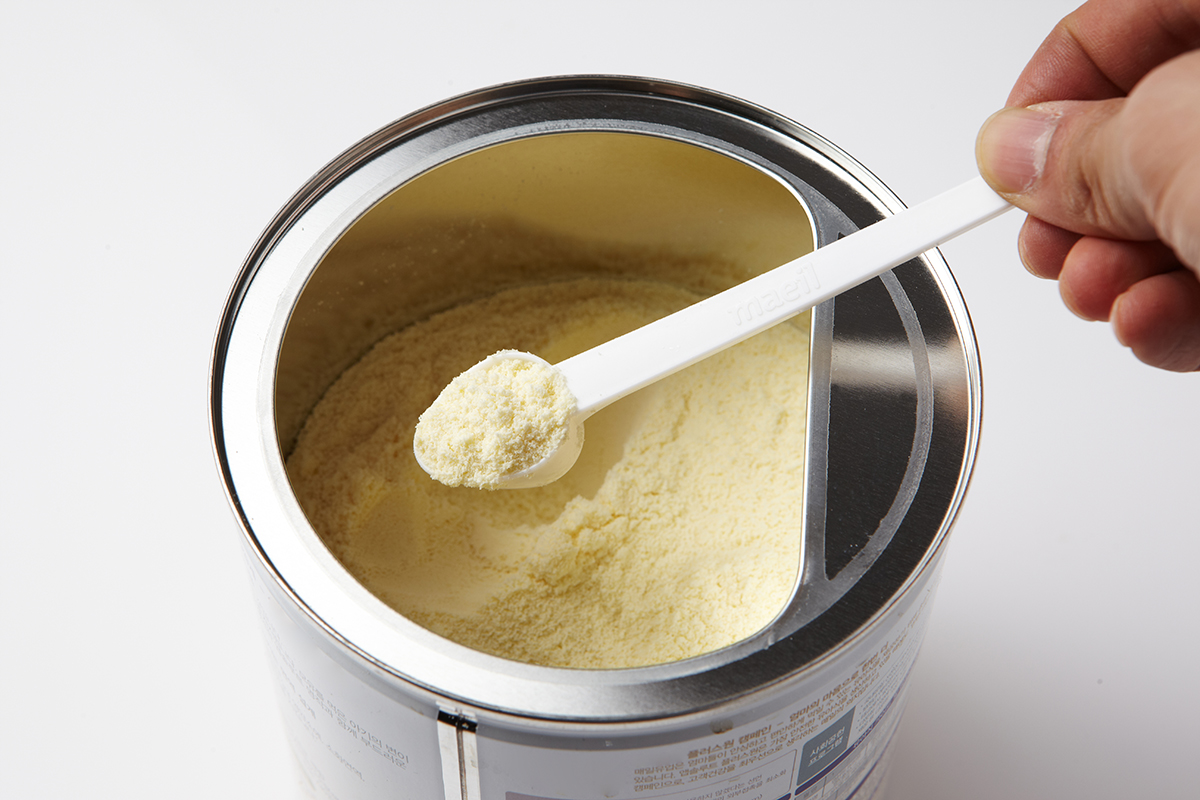
Infant formula

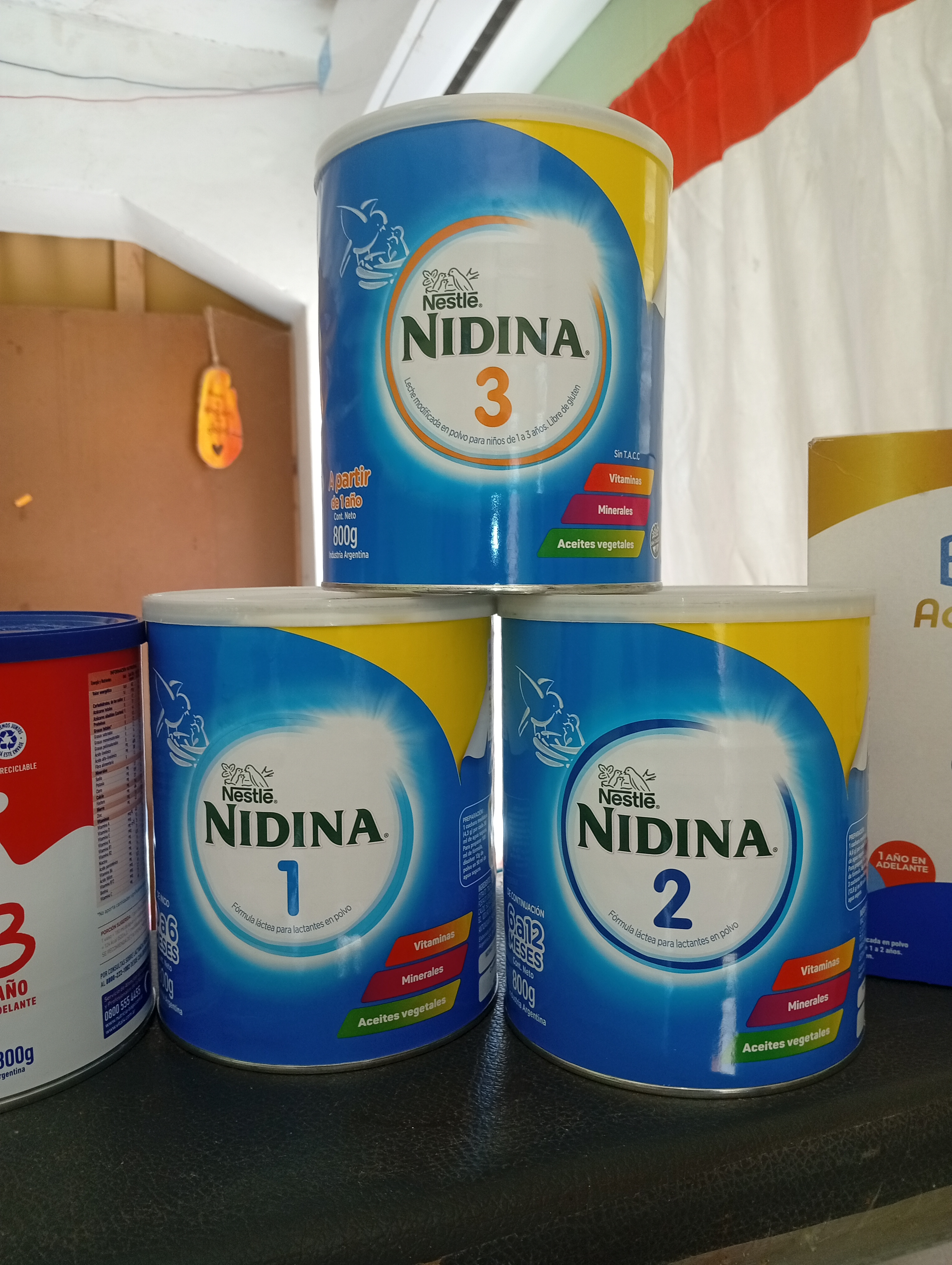
Cans of formula (brand name Nidina) as sold in Argentina

Infant formula, also called baby formula, simply formula (American English), formula milk, baby milk, or infant milk (British English), is a manufactured food designed and marketed for feeding infants under 12 months of age, usually prepared for bottle-feeding or cup-feeding from powder (mixed with water) or liquid (with or without additional water). The U.S. Federal Food, Drug, and Cosmetic Act (FFDCA) defines infant formula as "a food which purports to be or is represented for special dietary use solely as a food for infants because it simulates human milk or its suitability as a complete or partial substitute for human milk".

The use of infant formula has been found to be associated with health risks such as type 1 and 2 diabetes, sudden infant death syndrome (SIDS), eczema, and more when compared to infants who are breastfed.

A 2001 World Health Organization (WHO) report found that infant formula prepared per applicable Codex Alimentarius standards was a safe complementary food and a suitable breast milk substitute. In 2003, the WHO and UNICEF published their Global Strategy for Infant and Young Child Feeding, which restated that "processed-food products for ... young children should, when sold or otherwise distributed, meet applicable standards recommended by the Codex Alimentarius Commission", and also warned that "lack of breastfeeding—and especially lack of exclusive breastfeeding during the first half-year of life—are important risk factors for infant and childhood morbidity and mortality".

Some studies have shown that use of formulas can vary according to the parents' socio-economic status, ethnicity or other characteristics.

== Usage ==
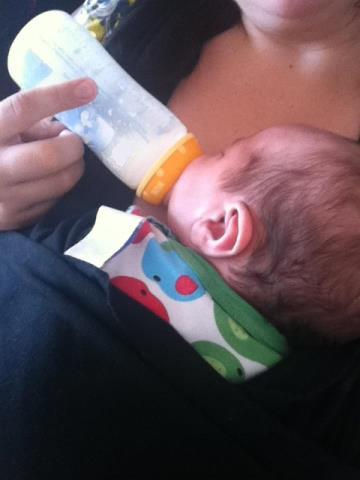
An infant being fed from a baby bottle

The use and marketing of infant formula have been subject to scrutiny. Breastfeeding, including exclusive breastfeeding for the first 6 months of life, is widely advocated as "ideal" for babies and infants, both by health authorities—and accordingly in ethical advertising of infant formula manufacturers. Despite the recommendation that babies be exclusively breastfed for the first 6 months, only 48% of infants below this age are exclusively breastfed worldwide. The overwhelming majority of American babies are not exclusively breastfed for this period—in 2025 24.9% of babies were breastfed exclusively for the first 6 months, with nearly 40% of babies less than 3 months of age being supplemented with infant formula in 2022, and approximately 20% of infants having infant formula feeding within two days of birth. The use of hydrolysed cow milk baby formula versus standard milk baby formula does not appear to change the risk of allergies or autoimmune diseases.

=== Use of infant formula ===
In some cases, breastfeeding is medically contraindicated; these include:

- Mother's health: The mother is infected with HIV or has active tuberculosis. She is extremely ill or has had certain kinds of breast surgery, which may have removed or disconnected all milk-producing parts of the breast. She is taking any kind of drug that could harm the baby, including both prescription drugs such as cytotoxic chemotherapy for cancer treatments, as well as illicit drugs.
  - One of the main global risks posed by breast milk specifically is the transmission of HIV and other infectious diseases. Breastfeeding by an HIV-infected mother poses a 5–20% chance of transmitting HIV to the baby. However, if a mother has HIV, she is more likely to transmit it to her child during the pregnancy or birth than during breastfeeding. A 2012 study conducted by researchers from the University of North Carolina School of Medicine showed reduced HIV-1 transmission in humanized mice, due to components in the breast milk. Cytomegalovirus infection poses potentially dangerous consequences for pre-term babies. Other risks include mother's infection with HTLV-1 or HTLV-2 (viruses that could cause T-cell leukemia in the baby), herpes simplex when lesions are present on the breasts, and chickenpox in the newborn when the disease manifested in the mother within a few days of birth. In some cases these risks can be mitigated by using heat-treated milk and nursing for a briefer time (e.g. 6 months, rather than 18–24 months), and can be avoided by using an uninfected woman's milk, as via a wet-nurse or milk bank, or by using infant formula and/or treated milk.
  - In balancing the risks, such as cases where the mother is infected with HIV, a decision to use infant formula versus exclusive breastfeeding may be made based on alternatives that satisfy the "AFASS" (Acceptable, Feasible, Affordable, Sustainable and Safe) principles.
- Baby is unable to breastfeed: The child has a birth defect or inborn error of metabolism such as galactosemia that makes breastfeeding difficult or impossible.
- Baby is considered at risk for malnutrition: In certain circumstances infants may be at risk for malnutrition, such as due to iron deficiency, vitamin deficiencies (e.g. vitamin D which may be less present in breast milk than needed at high latitudes where there is less sun exposure), or inadequate nutrition during transition to solid foods. Risks can often be mitigated with improved diet and education of mothers and caregivers, including availability of macro and micronutrients. For example, in Canada, marketed infant formulas are fortified with vitamin D, but Health Canada also recommends breastfed infants receive extra vitamin D in the form of a supplement.

Other reasons for not breastfeeding include:

- Personal preferences, beliefs, and experiences: The mother may dislike breast-feeding or find it inconvenient. In addition, breastfeeding can be difficult for victims of rape or sexual abuse; for example, it may be a trigger for posttraumatic stress disorder. Many families bottle feed to increase the father's role in parenting his child.
- Mental health: The pressure to breastfeed in many cultures can be so much that the mother's mental health may take a sharp decline. This can have physical effects such as poor latching, as well as milk depletion and a lack of connection to the child. In some cases, the child should be formula-fed so that a better bond can be made between mother and child, rather than the 'special bond' that comes from breastfeeding being tainted by negative breastfeeding experiences. The pressure to breastfeed in many cultures can increase the likelihood of postpartum depression.
- Absence of the mother: The child is adopted, orphaned, abandoned, or in the sole custody of a man or male same-sex couple. The mother is separated from her child by being in prison or a mental hospital. The mother has left the child in the care of another person for an extended period of time, such as while traveling or working abroad.
- Food allergies: The mother eats foods that may provoke an allergic reaction in the infant.
- Financial pressures: Maternity leave is unpaid, insufficient, or lacking. The mother's employment interferes with breastfeeding. Mothers who breastfeed may experience a loss of earning power.
- Societal structure: Breastfeeding may be forbidden, discouraged, or difficult at the mother's job, school, place of worship, or in other public places, or the mother may feel that breastfeeding in these places or around other people is immodest, unsanitary, or inappropriate.
- Social pressures: Family members, such as the mother's husband or boyfriend, or friends or other members of society, may encourage the use of infant formula. For example, they may believe that breastfeeding will decrease the mother's energy, health, or attractiveness. Conversely, societal pressures to breastfeed can also lead to mental health issues. A sense of shame from not being able to or struggling to do so equalling being a failure, has a connection to Postpartum Depression
- Lack of training and education: The mother lacks education and training from medical providers or community members.
- Lactation insufficiency: The mother is unable to produce sufficient milk. In studies that do not account for lactation failure with obvious causes (such as use of formula and/or breast pumps), chronic lactation insufficiency affects around 10–15% of women. For about 5–8% of women, milk coming in (i.e., lactogenesis II) may not occur at all, and only drops are produced. Alternatively, despite a healthy supply, the woman or her family may incorrectly believe that her breast milk is of low quality or in low supply. These women may choose infant formula either exclusively or as a supplement to breastfeeding. New research is showing that mothers who report problems with milk production have physical markers indicating low milk production, calling into question the assumption (called "perceived insufficient milk supply" or PIMS) that mothers are incorrect about the quantity of milk they are producing.
- Fear of exposure to environmental contaminants: Certain environmental pollutants, such as polychlorinated biphenyls, can bioaccumulate in the food chain and may be found in humans, including mothers' breast milk.
  - However, studies have shown that the greatest risk period for adverse effects from environmental exposures is prenatally. Other studies have further found that the levels of most persistent organohalogen compounds in human milk decreased significantly over the past three decades and equally did their exposure through breastfeeding.
  - Research on risks from chemical pollution is generally inconclusive in terms of outweighing the benefits of breastfeeding. Studies supported by the WHO and others have found that neurological benefits of breast milk remain, regardless of dioxin exposure.
  - In developing countries, environmental contaminants associated with increased health risks from use of infant formula, particularly diarrhoea due to unclean water and lack of sterile conditions – both prerequisites to the safe use of formula – often outweigh any risks from breastfeeding.
- Lack of other sources of breast milk:
  - Lack of wet nurses: Wet nursing is illegal and stigmatized in some countries, and may not be available. It may also be socially unsupported, expensive, or health screening of wet nurses may not be available. The mother, her doctor, or family may not know that wet nursing is possible, or may believe that nursing by a relative or paid wet-nurse is unhygienic.
  - Lack of milk banks: Human-milk banks may not be available, as few exist, and many countries cannot provide the necessary screening for diseases and refrigeration.

== Health risks and controversies ==
The use of infant formula has been cited for association with numerous increased health risks. Studies have found infants in developed countries who consume formula are at increased risk for acute otitis media, gastroenteritis, severe lower respiratory tract infections, atopic dermatitis, asthma, obesity, type 1 and 2 diabetes, sudden infant death syndrome (SIDS), eczema and necrotizing enterocolitis when compared to infants who are breastfed. Some studies have found an association between infant formula and lower cognitive development, including iron supplementation in baby formula being linked to lowered I.Q. and other neurodevelopmental delays; however other studies have found no correlation. Causation, however, has not been established for negative long-term health effects of infant formula; studies analyzing health outcomes for breastfed vs. formula fed babies are primarily observational in nature and are plagued with confounding factors such as socioeconomic status, education level, and maternal preexisting conditions (such as obesity, which is associated with both low milk production and childhood obesity). When confounding factors are controlled for, differences between the long-term health of breastfed and formula-fed infants decrease.

=== Melamine contamination ===
In 2008, a case of melamine poisoning of infant formula was discovered in China, where milk was deliberately adulterated with the chemical, leading to the death of six babies, and illnesses in more than 300,000 infants, including cases of acute kidney failure. Large quantities of melamine were added to watered-down milk to give it the appearance of having adequate protein levels. Some of those responsible for the poisoning were sentenced to death.

In November 2008, traces of melamine were reported to have been found by the U.S. Food and Drug Administration in infant formula sold in the United States made by the three main American firms — Abbott Laboratories, Nestlé, and Mead Johnson — responsible for 90–99% of the infant formula market in the country. The levels were much less than those reported in China, where levels of melamine contamination had reached as much as 2,500 parts per million (2.5%), about 10,000 times higher than the recorded US levels. The safety data sheet for melamine (CAS registry number 108-78-1; C3-H6-N6) recorded the acute oral toxicity (median lethal dose) at 3161 mg/kg for a rat.

Health Canada conducted a separate test and also detected traces of melamine in infant formula available in Canada. The melamine levels were well below Health Canada's safety limits, although concerns remain about the safety of manufactured food for infants and monitoring of potentially dangerous substances.

=== Bacterial Contamination ===
Like many prepared food products, infant formulas are occasionally contaminated with disease causing bacteria, occasionally at the source of production. Cronobacter sakazakii (formerly Enterobacter sakazakii), is a Gram-negative bacterium that has been occasionally found in infant formula products, likely due to its association with dried foods. Rarely, use of powdered infant formula (PIF) has been associated with serious illness, and even death, due to infection with Cronobacter sakazakii and other microorganisms that can be introduced to PIF during its production. Although C. sakazakii can cause illness in all age groups, infants are believed to be at greatest risk of infection. Between 1958 and 2006, there have been several dozen reported cases of C. sakazakii infection worldwide. The WHO believes that such infections are under-reported. In November 2025, infant formula contaminated with spores of the bacteria Clostridium botulinum, the causative agent of botulism, were detected as the cause of an outbreak of infant botulism sickening 13.

In January 2026, Nestlé issued a global recall of some batches of infant formula, due to the presence of cereulide, a heat-stable toxin produced by some strains of Bacillus cereus, B. megaterium and related species. The cereulide was found in a Nestlé production facility in the Netherlands. Danone also recalled a single batch of infant formula. The contaminated ingredient was arachidonic acid oil from Chinese supplier Cabio Biotech.

=== Other health controversies ===
- In 1985, Syntex Corporation was ordered to pay $27 million in compensation for the deaths of two American infants who suffered brain damage after drinking the company's baby formula, called Neo-mull-soy. Formulas produced by Syntex had previously been subject to a major recall as they were found to have insufficient chloride to support normal infant growth and development.
- In 2003, baby plant-based formula manufactured by the German company Humana and sold in Israel under the brand Remedia caused severe vitamin deficiencies in babies. Babies who consumed the formula were hospitalized with cardiac and neurological symptoms. Three of them died, and at least twenty others were left with severe disabilities. An investigation revealed that the formula contained a much lower quantity of Thiamine than is needed for healthy infant development because of a manufacturing error. Humana's chief food technologist received a 30-month prison sentence for negligent manslaughter in February 2013 over the case.
- In 2010, Abbott Laboratories issued a voluntary recall of about five million Similac brand powder infant formulas that were sold in the United States, Guam, Puerto Rico, and some Caribbean countries. The recall was issued after the presence of a 'small common beetle' was detected in the product.
- In Canada, New Zealand, and elsewhere, public concerns have been raised over the continued sale and marketing of soy-based formulae potentially containing high levels of phytoestrogens, linked to abnormal child development including damage to babies' thyroid glands.
- In December 2011, Wal-Mart recalled a quantity of infant formula after a baby died in Missouri. "We extend our deepest condolences to this baby boy's family as they try to come to grips with their loss," said Dianna Gee, a Wal-Mart spokeswoman. "As soon as we heard what happened, we immediately reached out to the manufacturer of the formula and to the Department of Health and Senior Services to provide any information we may have to help with the investigation." Wal-Mart said it pulled a batch of Enfamil from its stores nationwide that matched the size and lot number ZP1k7G of the formula that may have sickened the baby in Missouri, Gee said. The baby formula was purchased from a Walmart in Lebanon, Missouri. After the purchase, a 10-day-old infant died from a rare bacterial infection, CNN affiliate KYTV reported. Authorities ran tests to determine if the death came from the formula, the water to make the formula, or any other factor, said Mead Johnson Nutrition, the company that makes Enfamil. "We are highly confident in the safety and quality of our products – and the rigorous testing we put them through," said Chris Perille, a Mead Johnson Nutrition spokesman.

== Socioeconomic conditions ==
According to a research conducted in Vancouver, Canada, 82.9% of mothers breastfeed their babies at birth, but the number differed between white mothers (91.6%) and non-white mothers (56.8%), with the difference essentially attributed to marital status, education and family income. In the United States, mothers of lower socio-economic status are less likely to breastfeed, although this may be partly related to the adverse effects of government nutrition supplementation programs that provide subsidies for infant formula.

In less economically developed countries, the use of infant formula is linked to poorer health outcomes because of the prevalence of unsanitary preparation conditions, including a lack of clean water and a lack of sanitizing equipment. A formula-fed child living in unclean conditions is between 6 and 25 times more likely to die of diarrhea and four times more likely to die of pneumonia than a breastfed child.

== Preparation and content ==
=== Variations ===
Infant formulas come in powder, liquid concentrate, and ready-to-feed forms. They are designed to be prepared by the parent or caregiver in small batches and fed to the infant, usually with either a cup or a baby bottle.

Infant formulas come in a variety of types:

- Cow's milk formula is the most commonly used type. The milk has been altered to resemble breast milk.
- Soy protein-based formulas are frequently used for infants allergic to cow's milk or lactose. Soy-based formulas can also be useful if the parent wants to exclude animal proteins from the child's diet.
- Protein hydrolysate formulas contain protein that's been broken down into smaller sizes than that in cow's milk and soy-based formulas. Protein hydrolysate formulas are meant for babies who do not tolerate cow's milk or soy-based formulas.
- Specialized formulas are also available for premature infants and those with specific medical conditions.

Manufacturers and health officials advise that it is very important to measure powders or concentrates accurately to achieve the intended final product concentration; otherwise, the child will be malnourished. All equipment that comes into contact with the infant formula should be cleaned and sterilized before each use. Proper refrigeration is essential for any infant formula that is prepared in advance.

In developing countries, formula is frequently prepared improperly, resulting in high infant mortality due to malnutrition and diseases such as diarrhea and pneumonia. This is due to a lack of clean water, lack of sterile conditions, a lack of refrigeration, illiteracy (so written instructions cannot be followed), poverty (diluting formula so that it lasts longer), and a lack of education of mothers by formula distributors. These problems and resulting disease and death are a key factor in opposition to the marketing and distribution of infant formula in developing countries by numerous public health agencies and NGOs (discussed in more detail at Nestlé boycott and International Code of Marketing of Breast-milk Substitutes).

=== Nutritional content ===
Manufacturers state that the composition of infant formula is designed to be roughly based on a human mother's milk at approximately one to three months postpartum; however, there are significant differences in the nutrient content of these products. The most commonly used infant formulas contain purified cow's milk whey and casein as a protein source, a blend of vegetable oils as a fat source, (Note: As of 1915.) lactose as a carbohydrate source, a vitamin-mineral mix, and other ingredients depending on the manufacturer. Modern infant formulas also contain human milk oligosaccharides, which are beneficial for immune development and a healthy gut microbiota in babies. In addition, there are infant formulas using soybean as a protein source in place of cow's milk (mostly in the United States and Great Britain) and formulas using protein hydrolysed into its component amino acids for infants who are allergic to other proteins.

An upswing in breastfeeding in many countries has been accompanied by a deferment in the average age of introduction of baby foods (including cow's milk), resulting in both increased breastfeeding and increased use of infant formula between the ages of 3- and 12-months.

Besides breast milk, infant formula is the only other milk product that the medical community considers nutritionally acceptable for infants under the age of one year (as opposed to cow's milk, goat's milk, or follow-on formula). Supplementing with solid food in addition to breast milk or formula begins during weaning, and most babies begin supplementing about the time their first teeth appear, usually around the age of six months.

Although cow's milk is the basis of almost all infant formula, plain cow's milk is unsuited for infants because of its high casein content and low whey content, and untreated cow's milk is not recommended before the age of 12 months. The infant intestine is not properly equipped to digest non-human milk, and this may often result in diarrhea, intestinal bleeding and malnutrition. To reduce the negative effect on the infant's digestive system, cow's milk used for formula undergoes processing to be made into infant formula. This includes steps to make protein more easily digestible and alter the whey-to-casein protein balance to one closer to human milk, the addition of several essential ingredients (often called "fortification", see below), the partial or total replacement of dairy fat with fats of vegetable or marine origin, etc.

Carbohydrates are an important source of energy for growing infants, as they account for 35 to 42% of their daily energy intake. In most cow's milk-based formulas, lactose is the main source of carbohydrates present, but lactose is not present in cow's milk-based lactose-free formulas, nor specialized non-milk protein formulas or hydrolyzed protein formulas for infants with milk protein sensitivity. Lactose is also not present in soy-based formulas. Therefore, those formulas without lactose will use other sources of carbohydrates, such as sucrose and glucose, dextrins, and natural and modified starches. Lactose is not only a good source of energy, it also aids in the absorption of the minerals magnesium, calcium, zinc and iron.

The nutrient content of infant formula for sale in the United States is regulated by the Food and Drug Administration (FDA) based on recommendations by the American Academy of Pediatrics Committee on Nutrition. The following must be included in all formulas produced in the U.S.:

- Protein
- Fat
- Linoleic acid
- Vitamins: A, C, D, E, K, thiamin (B_{1}), riboflavin (B_{2}), B_{6}, B_{12}, niacin, folic acid, pantothenic acid
- Minerals: calcium, magnesium, iron, zinc, manganese, copper, iodine, selenium, sodium, potassium, chloride

Non-milk-based formulas must also add the vitamins biotin, choline and inositol.

Additionally, manufacturers may choose to add additional ingredients to their formulas. These additional ingredients are often used to differentiate their products in the market, as the nutrient composition of formulas is otherwise highly similar between products. Not all additives are clearly beneficial according to current studies, either because no benefit has been demonstrated, or because the additives are too new to have received significant scientific scrutiny.

Omega-3 fatty acids
Omega-3 fatty acids, such as DHA, are often added to infant formula, purportedly to support brain development, although studies have generally failed to find a significant effect on neurodevelopmental outcomes. Infants can synthesize DHA and other fatty acids from the linoleic acid in formula. As formula additives, these fatty acids are often derived from fish oil or similar sources.
Human milk oligosaccharides (HMOs)
HMOs are naturally occurring sugars found in human breast milk and may work to improve the immune system and act as nutrients for beneficial gut bacteria. However, while human breastmilk contains dozens of different types of HMOs, commercial infant formula usually only includes a few of the more common types.
Nucleotides
Nucleotides are compounds found naturally in human breast milk. They are involved in critical metabolic processes, such as energy metabolism and enzymatic reactions. Also, as the building blocks of deoxyribonucleic acid (DNA) and ribonucleic acid (RNA), they are essential for normal body functions. Compared to human breast milk, cow's milk has lower levels of the nucleotides uridine, inosine, and cytidine. Therefore, several companies that produce infant formula have added nucleotides to their infant formulas.

Other commonly used ingredients:

- Emulsifiers and stabilizers: Ingredients added to prevent the separation of the oil from the water (and its soluble components) in the infant formula. Some commonly used emulsifiers include monoglycerides, diglycerides, and gums.
- Diluents: Skim milk is commonly used as the primary diluent in milk-based liquid formula to provide the bulk of the volume. In contrast, purified water is the most commonly used diluent in milk-free formulations.

Changes to nutritional content:

The FDA's Operation Stork Speed expert panel for 2025 recommended updates to the U.S infant formula nutrient standards, these are regulations that have not been significantly modified since the 80s. The recommended changes align more with some of the international guidelines, such as those in Europe. Some of the recommendations included changes in essential fatty acids, reducing iron levels, reconsidering high protein levels and changing the non-lactose carbohydrate components.

== Policy, industry and marketing ==
The policy, regulatory, and industry environments surrounding the infant formula market vary tremendously between countries.

=== International ===
The International Code of Marketing of Breast-milk Substitutes is an international health policy framework adopted by the World Health Assembly of the WHO in 1981 regarding infant formula marketing, including strict restrictions on advertising. Its implementation depends on the laws of different countries and the behavior of infant formula manufacturers – the code has no power itself. Legislation and corporate behavior vary significantly between countries: at least 84 countries have enacted national legislation implementing all or many of the provisions of the Code, and 14 countries have draft laws awaiting adoption; whereas elsewhere, neither the Code nor its principles are followed by governments or formula manufacturers.

Practices that are banned in the Code include most advertising, claiming health benefits for formula, and giving free samples to women able to breastfeed – this latter practice is particularly criticized because it can interfere with lactation, creating dependence on formula, without proper education on ensuring continued breast stimulation while formula is being used. In many countries, free samples of infant formula have been provided to hospitals for decades; infant formula is often the only product routinely provided free of charge to hospitals. The Baby Friendly Hospital Initiative (BFHI) aims to reduce and eliminate this controversial practice; however, there is increasing criticism of the BFHI's rigidity in limiting use of infant formula, which can be an appropriate treatment for common conditions such as suboptimal intake jaundice, and may cause mothers to feel pressured or guilted into breastfeeding.

=== By country ===
==== Philippines ====
Infant formula is one of the top three consumer commodities in the Philippines, and among the most imported products. Annual sales amount to some US$469 million annually. US$88 million is spent on advertising the product.

Infant formula marketing has been regulated since the 1987 Executive Order 51 or "Milk Code", which regulated, but did not ban, practices such as advertising and providing free samples. Shortly after it was enacted, Wyeth introduced "follow-on formula", which was not in the purview of the Milk Code, which predated its market entry.

In 2006, the Department of Health banned the advertising of infant formula and the practice of providing free samples, regardless of intended age group (in the Revised Implementing Rules and Regulations of Executive Order 51, or RIRR). The new regulation was challenged by the infant formula industry in the Supreme Court. Initially the challenge was dismissed, but this decision was reversed following industry pressure and a controversial letter by American business leader Thomas Donahue, then President and CEO of the US Chamber of Commerce, resulting in the regulation being suspended and advertising continuing.

The Guardian newspaper reports widespread illegal advertising and marketing of formula milk contrary to World Health Organization guidelines. Doctors and midwives are encouraged to promote feeding babies formula milk, and advertising also targets mothers directly. Babies get sick and sometimes die because poor mothers cannot sterilize bottles.

==== South Africa ====
In South Africa, there is a move towards plain packaging of infant formula under R 991 of the Foodstuffs, Cosmetics and Disinfectants Act; as of 6 December 2013, Regulation 7 (Sale and Promotion) is force, whereas Regulations 2-6 (primarily with respect to labelling) are scheduled to come into force on 6 December 2014. One of the key requirements as per Regulation 3.1.A.iii is a conspicuous message stating "[t]his product shall only be used on the advice of a health professional".

==== Thailand ====
In 2017, Thailand banned advertising for infant formula. Initially, a ban on advertising for toddler formula was also proposed, but was dropped after the intervention of United States trade officials.

==== United Kingdom ====
In the United Kingdom, infant formula advertising has been prohibited since 1995; advertising for "follow-on formula" is legal, which has been cited as a loophole allowing advertising of similarly packaged formula.

==== United States ====
In the United States, infant formula is both heavily marketed—the country has not adopted the WHO Code, nor is it being systematically implemented by manufacturers for domestic marketing—and even heavily subsidized by the government: at least one third of the American market is supported by the government, with over half of infant formula sold in the country provided through the Special Supplemental Nutrition Program for Women, Infants, and Children (known as WIC). This aggressive marketing crosses international boundaries, with the US intervening in at least 17 jurisdiction including Thailand, Canada, EU, South African, and China to oppose attempts at restricting infant formula marketing or requiring extra safety standards to protect US infant formula exports.

According to surveys, over 70% of large U.S. hospitals dispense infant formula to all infants, a practice opposed by the American Academy of Pediatrics and in violation of the Code. The Gerber Products Company began marketing its brand of infant formula directly to the public in October 1989, while the Carnation Company began marketing Good Start infant formula directly to the public in January 1991.

Infant formula costs are a significant fraction of the WIC program costs: 21% post-rebate and 46% pre-rebate. Formula manufacturers are granted a WIC monopoly in individual states. Meanwhile, breastfeeding rates are substantially lower for WIC recipients; this is partly attributed to formula being free of charge to mothers in the WIC program, who are of lower socio-economic status. Violations of federal policy have also been found in terms of infant formula company advertising using the WIC trademark, to reach both WIC and non-WIC participants. In recent years WIC has been expanding its breastfeeding promotion strategies, including providing subsidies for clients who use milk banks.

=== 2022 United States Baby Formula Shortages ===
Supply chain disruptions related to the government response to the COVID-19 pandemic in the United States have been reported as responsible for causing widespread shortages of infant formula in the United States, as of May 2022. This contrasts with far less severe shortages of infant formula around the globe. Reason magazine reported that this was largely the result of Food and Drug Administration (FDA) processes delaying approval of otherwise safe infant formula from Europe or other sources abroad, which might otherwise have eased demand for infant formula tensions in the United States.

As a result of the shortages, on May 16, 2022, the FDA announced that it would temporarily ease enforcement of some labeling rules to allow the importation of foreign formulas. FDA Commissioner Robert Califf stated, "Today's action paves the way for companies who don't normally distribute their infant formula products in the U.S. to do so efficiently and safely. We anticipate that those products that can quickly meet safety and nutrition standards could hit U.S. stores in a matter of weeks." Former FDA associate commissioner, Peter Pitts, asserts that the FDA's regulatory scheme is at least partially to blame for the shortage. Pitts states, "The difference between European baby formula and American baby formula, more or less, is that the labeling is different. The knot in getting that product into the U.S. isn't safety, it's a regulatory issue. I don't want to say it's a nitty issue, but it's certainly something the FDA could have jumped on a lot quicker."

For European infant formula, The European Food Safety Authority (EFSA) provide dietary information that helps with guiding the formulation while the regulations are governed by the EU commission directives. Many of the European formulas do meet nutritional specifications required by the FDA, some compositional differences include: lower protein and lower iron concentrations.

Amid and before the formula shortages, Woman and Infant Children (WIC) centers in Georgia and North Carolina were disposing of infant formula. This was done under the USDA's recommendation that unused, returned WIC infant formula were to be disposed of upon return. Despite an attempt by the USDA to walk back this recommendation by stating that it is a recommendation rather than a requirement, the USDA confirms that it will not reverse this recommendation, even amid the formula shortage. As a result, from October 2021 through May 2022, 16,459 cans of baby formula were destroyed by WIC clinics in Georgia and an unknown amount of baby formula cans were destroyed in North Carolina and other US States.

On July 6, 2022, the FDA announced that it would change its rules to allow foreign formula manufacturers to permanently import their goods into the U.S., potentially reducing the severity of the shortage. Critics of the FDA note that this does not remove the regulations entirely and that this shortage has been self-imposed by the FDA from the start. Additionally, critics note that if a formula maker passes EU regulations, this should be good enough for the FDA to allow importation of that formula.

Critics of the FDA's regulatory policy note that the regulatory scheme surrounding European formulas is not borne from a science-based desire to protect children, but rather an influence that the US dairy industry has on the agency. Critics also note that if there were an issue with European formulas, the issue would be widespread among the European babies that regularly consume the formula.

The FORMULA Act is set to expire at the end of 2022, which will subsequently reinstate tariffs on foreign-made formula. Experts worry that this will result in a repeat formula shortage for 2023. The CEO of the National Milk Producers Federation, a lobbying organization for dairy producers, wrote in a letter to Congress and the Biden administration to allow for the reinstatement of tariffs on foreign baby formula to commence.

== History ==
The Wabanaki and other Native American tribal nations of North America made an infant formula from nuts and cornmeal. Elizabeth Hanson was kidnapped by Wabanaki in 1725 and a Native American woman showed Hanson how to make this infant formula and she included this in her captivity narrative.

=== Early infant foods ===
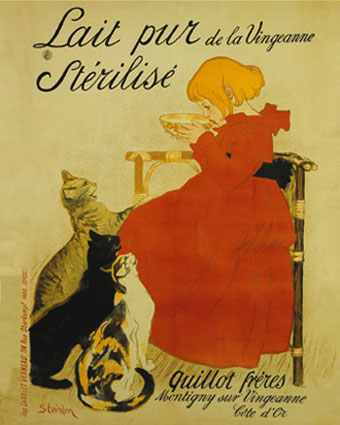
Poster advertisement for Nestle's Milk by Théophile Alexandre Steinlen, 1895

In 1865, the first infant food was invented by the chemist Justus von Liebig.

Throughout history, mothers who could not breastfeed their babies either employed a wet nurse or, less frequently, prepared food for their babies, a process known as "dry nursing". Baby food composition varied according to region and economic status. In Europe and North America during the early 19th century, the prevalence of wet nursing began to decrease, while the practice of feeding babies mixtures based on animal milk rose in popularity.

This trend was driven by cultural changes as well as increased sanitation measures, and it continued throughout the 19th and much of the 20th century, with a notable increase after Elijah Pratt invented and patented the India-rubber nipple in 1845. As early as 1846, scientists and nutritionists noted an increase in medical problems and infant mortality was associated with dry nursing. In an attempt to improve the quality of manufactured baby foods, in 1867, Justus von Liebig developed the world's first commercial infant formula, Liebig's Soluble Food for Babies. The success of this product quickly gave rise to competitors such as Mellin's Food, Ridge's Food for Infants and Nestlé's Milk.

=== Raw milk formulas ===
As physicians became increasingly concerned about the quality of such foods, medical recommendations such as Thomas Morgan Rotch's "percentage method" (published in 1890) began to be distributed, and gained widespread popularity by 1907. These complex formulas recommended that parents mix cow's milk, water, cream, and sugar or honey in specific ratios to achieve the nutritional balance believed to approximate human milk reformulated in such a way as to accommodate the believed digestive capability of the infant.

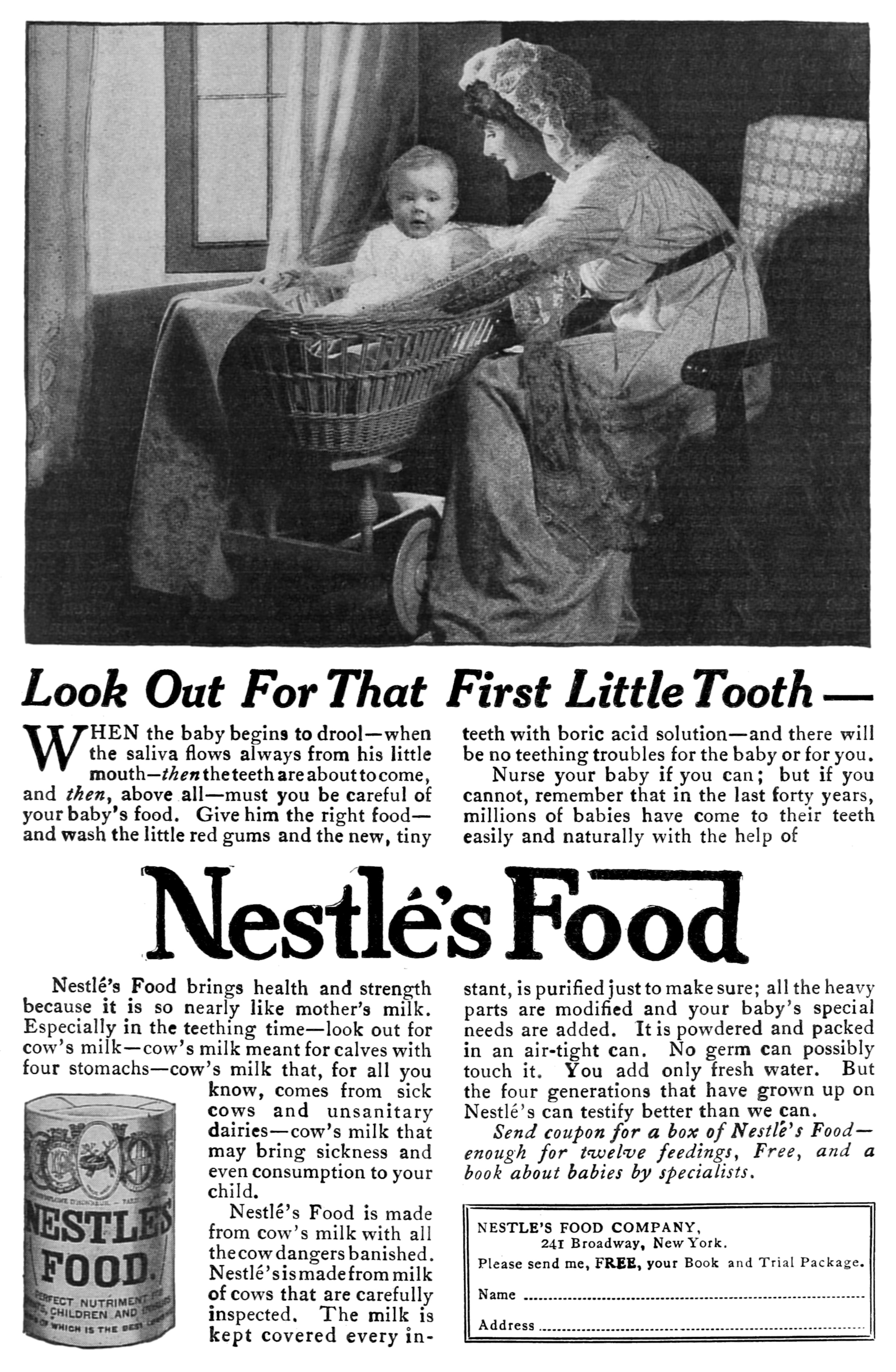
A 1915 advertisement for "Nestlé's Food"

At the dawn of the 20th century in the United States, most infants were breastfed, although many received some formula feeding as well. Home-made "percentage method" formulas were more commonly used than commercial formulas in both Europe and the United States. They were less expensive and were widely believed to be healthier. However, formula-fed babies exhibited more diet-associated medical problems, such as scurvy, rickets, and bacterial infections than breastfed babies. By 1920, the incidence of scurvy and rickets in formula-fed babies had greatly decreased through the addition of orange juice and cod liver oil to home-made formulas. Bacterial infections associated with formula remained a problem, more prevalent in the United States than in Europe, where milk was usually boiled prior to use in formulas.

=== Evaporated milk formulas ===
In the 1920s and 1930s, evaporated milk began to be widely commercially available at low prices, and several clinical studies in the period suggested that breastfed babies and babies fed evaporated milk equally thrived.

These studies, accompanied by the affordable price of evaporated milk and the availability of the home icebox, initiated a tremendous rise in the use of evaporated milk formulas. By the late 1930s, the use of evaporated milk formulas in the United States surpassed all commercial formulas, and by 1950, over half of all babies in the United States were reared on such formulas.

=== Commercial formulas ===
In parallel with the enormous shift (in industrialized nations) away from breastfeeding to home-made formulas, nutrition scientists continued to analyze human milk and attempted to make infant formulas that more closely matched its composition. Maltose and dextrins were believed nutritionally important, and in 1912, the Mead Johnson Company released a milk additive called Dextri-Maltose. This formula was made available to mothers only by physicians. In 1915 a synthetic infant formula known as SMA (simulated milk adapted) was developed at Cleveland's Babies Dispensary (which later merged into University Hospitals) by Dr. Henry J. Gerstenberger, Dr. Harold Ruh, and William Frohring. In 1919, milk fats were replaced with a blend of animal and vegetable fats as part of the continued drive to closely simulate human milk.

In the late 1920s, Alfred Bosworth released Similac (for "similar to lactation"), and Mead Johnson released Sobee. Several other formulas were released over the next few decades, but commercial formulas did not begin to seriously compete with evaporated milk formulas until the 1950s. The reformulation and concentration of Similac in 1951 and the introduction (by Mead Johnson) of Enfamil (for "infant milk") in 1959 were accompanied by marketing campaigns that provided inexpensive formula to hospitals and pediatricians. By the early 1960s, commercial formulas were more commonly used than evaporated milk formulas in the United States, which all but vanished in the 1970s. By the early 1970s, over 75% of American babies were fed on formulas, almost entirely commercially produced.

When birth rates in industrial nations tapered off during the 1960s, infant formula companies heightened marketing campaigns in non-industrialized countries. The poor sanitation in these countries led to steeply increased mortality rates among infants fed the often contaminated formula. Additionally, a WHO has cited over-diluting formula preparations as resulting in infant malnourishment. Organized protests, the most famous of which was the Nestlé boycott of 1977, called for an end to unethical marketing. This boycott is ongoing, as the current coordinators maintain that Nestlé engages in marketing practices which violate the International Code of Marketing of Breast-milk Substitutes.

=== Generic brand formulas ===
In addition to commercially marketed brands, generic brands (or store brands) of infant formula were introduced in the United States in 1997, first by PBM Products. These private label formulas are sold by many leading food and drug retailers such as Wal-Mart, Target, Kroger, Loblaws, and Walgreens. All infant formula brands in the United States are required to adhere to the Food and Drug Administration (FDA) guidelines. As reported by the Mayo Clinic: "as with most consumer products, brand-name infant formulas cost more than generic brands. But that doesn't mean that brand-name [Similac, Nestle, Enfamil] formulas are better. Although manufacturers may vary somewhat in their formula recipes, the FDA requires that all formulas contain the same nutrient density."

Similarly, in Canada, all infant formulas, regardless of brand, are required to meet standards set by Health Canada.

=== Follow-on, transition, and toddler formulas ===
Follow-on or toddler formulas are sold for ages 6 months to 3 years (when infants are typically breastfed). In the US, a transition formula is marketed for children from age 9 to 24 months, and a toddler milk is sold for children aged 12 to 26 months. In the UK, follow-on milk is marketed towards children 6–12 months, and toddler milk for children aged 2 to 3 years. Toddler milk marketed in the US contains powdered milk, corn syrup and other added sugars, vegetable oil, and salt.

Toddler formulas are not nutritionally complete, nor are they subject to the same regulations or food labeling laws as infant formula. Critics have argued that follow-on and toddler formulas were introduced to circumvent the regulations regarding infant formula and have resulted in confusing advertising.

An early example of follow-on formula was introduced by Wyeth in the Philippines in 1987, following the introduction in this country of regulations on infant formula advertising, but which did not address follow-on formulas (products that did not exist at the time of their drafting). Similarly, while infant formula advertising is illegal in the United Kingdom, follow-on formula advertising is legal, and the similar packaging and market results in follow-on advertisements frequently being interpreted as advertisements for formula. (See also industry and marketing, below.)

These products have also recently fallen under criticism for contributing to the childhood obesity epidemic in some developed countries due to their marketing and flavoring practices. The drinks are also expensive. Although usually not quite as expensive as infant formula, they can cost four times the price of cow's milk.

=== Usage since 1970s ===
Since the early 1970s, industrial countries have witnessed a resurgence in breastfeeding among newborns and infants to 6 months of age. This upswing in breastfeeding has been accompanied by a delay in the average age of introduction of other foods (such as cow's milk), resulting in increased use of both breastfeeding and infant formula between the ages of 3–12 months.

The global infant formula market has been estimated at $7.9 billion, with North America and Western Europe accounting for 33% of the market and considered largely saturated, and Asia representing 53% of the market. South East Asia is a particularly large fraction of the world market relative to its population. Infant formula is the largest segment of the baby food market, with the fraction given as between 40% and 70%.

Leading health organizations (e.g. WHO, U.S. Centers for Disease Control and Department of Health and Human Services) are attempting to reduce the use of infant formula and increase the prevalence of breastfeeding from birth through 12 to 24 months of age through public health awareness campaigns. The specific goals and approaches of these breastfeeding promotion programs, and the policy environment surrounding their implementation, vary by country. As a policy basic framework, the International Code of Marketing of Breast-milk Substitutes, adopted by the WHO's World Health Assembly in 1981, requires infant formula companies to preface their product information with statements that breastfeeding is the best way of feeding babies and that a substitute should only be used after consultation with health professionals. The Baby Friendly Hospital Initiative (BFHI) also restricts use by hospitals of free formula or other infant care aids provided by formula companies. (See also Policy section below.) While the Code was intended to restrict inappropriate marketing of infant formula, not access to it, parents have complained of being lectured or made to sign waivers implying formula would harm their babies in BFHI hospitals.

== Infant formula processing ==
=== History ===
A formula containing wheat flour, cow's milk, malt flour, and potassium bicarbonate was developed in 1867. A powder form was introduced in 1915, containing cow's milk, lactose, oleo oils, and vegetable oils. In 1929, Soy formula was introduced. In 1935, Protein was added because it was believed cow's milk protein content was lower than human milk protein content; protein at 3.3–4.0 g/100 kcal was added.

Iron fortification was introduced in 1959 because a large amount of iron (~80%) is used to expand the red blood cell mass in a growing infant. Infants with birth weights between 1500~2500g require 2 mg/kg of iron per day. Infants with weights of less than 1500g require 4 mg/kg per day. In 1962, The whey:casein ratio was made similar to human milk because producers were aware that human milk contains a higher ratio of whey protein, and cow's milk contains a higher ratio of casein. In 1984, taurine fortification was introduced because newborn infants lack the enzymes needed to convert and form taurine.

Nucleotide fortification was introduced into infant formula in the late 1990s because nucleotides can act as growth factors and may enhance the infant's immune system. In the early 2000s, polyunsaturated fatty acid fortification was introduced because those fatty acids play an important role in infant brain development. It mainly include polyunsaturated fatty acids, such as docosahexaenoic acid (DHA) and arachidonic acid (ARA).

=== Current general procedure ===
The manufacturing process may differ for different types of formula made; therefore, the following is the general procedure for liquid-milk based formulas:

Mixing ingredients
Primary ingredients are blended in large stainless steel tanks, and skim milk is added and adjusted to 60 °C. Then, fats, oils, and emulsifiers are added. Additional heating and mixing may be required to get proper consistency. Next, minerals, vitamins, and stabilizing gums are added at various points, depending on their sensitivity to heat. The batch is temporarily stored and then transported by pipelines to pasteurization equipment when mixing is complete.
Pasteurization
A process that protects against spoilage by eliminating bacteria, yeasts, and molds. It involves quickly heating and then cooling the product under controlled conditions, which microorganisms cannot survive. The batch is held at around 85–94 °C for approximately 30 seconds, which is necessary to adequately reduce micro-organisms and prepare the formula for filling.
Homogenization
A process which increases emulsion uniformity and stability by reducing the size of fat and oil particles in the formula. It is done with a variety of mixing equipment that applies shear to the product, and this mixing breaks fat and oil particles into very small droplets.
Standardization
Used to ensure that the key parameters, like pH, fat concentration, and vitamins and mineral content, are correct. If insufficient levels of these are found, the batch is reworked to achieve appropriate levels. After this step, the batch is ready to be packaged.
Packaging
Generally, liquid formula is filled into metal cans with lids crimped into place, while detailed packaging will depend on the manufacturer and type of equipment used.
Heat treatment or sterilization
Finally, infant formulas are heat-treated to maintain the bacteriologic quality of the product. This can be done traditionally by either retort sterilization or high-temperature short-time (HTST) treatment. Recently, ultrahigh-temperature-treated formula has become more commonly used. If powdered formula is made, then spray drying would be required in addition. Retort sterilization is a traditional retort sterilization method that uses 10-15mins treatment at 118 °C. Ultrahigh-temperature (UHT) is a method that uses a brief (2–3 seconds) treatment at 142 °C. Because of the short time used, there is little protein denaturation, but the process still ensures sterility of the final product.

=== Recent and future potential new ingredients ===
==== Probiotics ====
Randomized, controlled trials completed in the 2000s have shown limited and short-term clinical benefits for the use of probiotics in infants' diet. A 2018 clinical study using the multistrain De Simone Formulation probiotic showed it helped some infants reduce symptoms of infant colic. The safety of probiotics in general and in infants, especially preterm infants, has been investigated in a limited number of controlled trials. The findings thus far suggest probiotics are generally safe, though the research is preliminary and has yet to provide definitive conclusions.

==== Prebiotics ====
Prebiotics are undigestible carbohydrates that promote the growth of probiotic bacteria in the gut. Human milk contains a variety of oligosaccharides believed to be an important factor in the pattern of microflora colonization of breastfed infants. Because of the variety, variability, complexity, and polymorphism of the oligosaccharide composition and structure, it is currently not feasible to reproduce the oligosaccharide components of human milk in a strictly structural fashion.

The European Society of Pediatric Gastroenterology, Hepatology, and Nutrition Committee on Nutrition found evidence to support the short-term effects of ingesting prebiotics on the stool microflora of infants, with an increase in the number of bifidobacteria. Babies can be at risk of dehydration with the induction of softer stools, if they have kidney immaturity and/or a poor ability to concentrate urine. A reduction of pathogens has been associated with the consumption of prebiotics. However, there was no evidence to support major clinical or long-term benefits. Therefore, there is little evidence of beneficial effects of prebiotics in dietary products.

==== Lysozyme and lactoferrin ====
Lysozyme is an enzyme that is responsible for protecting the body by damaging bacterial cell walls. Lactoferrin is a globular, multifunctional protein that has antimicrobial activity. Compared to human milk, cow's milk has significantly lower levels of lysozyme and lactoferrin; therefore, the industry has an increasing interest in adding them to infant formulas.

==== Long chain polyunsaturated fatty acid supplementation ====
Some manufacturers have begun supplementing formula milk with long-chain polyunsaturated fatty acids (LCPUFA). The current evidence suggests that there may be little or no difference between formula milk with and without LCPUFA supplementation in terms of babies' visual function, physical growth, or neurodevelopment.

== See also ==
- 2022 United States infant formula shortage
- 2008 Chinese milk scandal
- Amino acid-based formula
- Baby food
- Baby bottle
- Breastfeeding
- Breast milk
- Child development
- Dairy allergy
- Donkey milk
- Infant feeding
- List of dairy products
