= International Code of Marketing of Breast-milk Substitutes =

International health policy framework

The International Code of Marketing of Breast-milk Substitutes (also known as the WHO Code) is an international health policy framework for breastfeeding promotion adopted by the World Health Assembly (WHA) of the World Health Organization (WHO) in 1981. The Code was developed as a global public health strategy and recommends restrictions on the marketing of breast milk substitutes, such as infant formula, to ensure that mothers are not discouraged from breastfeeding and that substitutes are used safely if needed. The Code also covers ethical considerations and regulations for the marketing of feeding bottles and teats. A number of subsequent WHA resolutions have further clarified or extended certain provisions of the Code.

Since 1981, 84 countries have enacted legislation implementing all or many of the provisions of the Code and subsequent relevant WHA resolutions.

== Provisions ==
The Code aims to shield breastfeeding from commercial promotion that affects mothers, health workers and health care systems. The Code and resolutions also contain specific provisions and recommendations relating to labelling of infant formula and other breastmilk substitutes.

i. Mothers

- Information and educational materials on infant and young child feeding should be objective and consistent and emphasize the importance of breastfeeding. In no case should such materials refer to a brand name of a product.
- All forms of product advertising and promotion are prohibited.
- Mothers should not be given free product samples.
- Promotional devices such as discounts and special displays at the retail level are prohibited.
- Company representatives may not initiate direct or indirect contact with mothers.
- Health risks to infants who are artificially fed or who are not exclusively breastfed should be highlighted through appropriate labeling and warnings.

ii. Health workers

- The Code gives health workers the responsibility to encourage and protect breastfeeding.
- Materials regarding products given to health professionals by manufacturers and distributors should be limited to ‘scientific and factual’ matters. They should not be tools to promote the use of products.
- Product samples may be given only when necessary for professional evaluation or research at the institutional level. In no case should these samples be passed on to mothers.
- In order to prevent conflicts of interest, manufacturers and distributors should not give material or financial inducements to health workers. Three WHA resolutions on infant and young child nutrition subsequent to the adoption of the Code specifically cautioned against conflicts of interest. A 1996 resolution (WHA resolution 49.15) called for caution in accepting financial support for health professionals working in infant and young child health which may create conflicts of interest. The need to avoid conflicts of interest was expanded in 2005 (WHA resolution 58.32) to cover programmes in infant and young child health and reiterated in 2008 (WHA resolution 61.20).

iii. Health care systems

- Promotion of any product is forbidden in a health care facility. This includes the display of products, placards and posters concerning such products and distribution of materials provided by manufacturers and distributors.
- Formula feeding should be demonstrated only to those mothers or family members who need to use it and the information given should include a clear explanation of the risks of formula feeding and hazards of improper use of products.
- Donated equipment and materials should not refer to brand names of products.
- Free Supplies: Two subsequent resolutions (WHA 39.28 [1986] and WHA 47.5 [1994]) effectively call for an end to all free or low-cost supplies to any part of the health care system. Manufacturers and distributors are therefore prohibited from providing products to health care facilities for free or at low cost. (According to guidelines under the Baby Friendly Hospital Initiative, ‘low cost’ means less than 80% of the retail price.)

iv. Labelling

- Information on labels for infant formula must be in simple and easy to understand terms in an appropriate language.
- Labels of infant formula must contain a statement on the superiority of breastfeeding and that the product should only be used after consultation with health professionals.
- Pictures or text which may idealize the use of infant formula and certain wordings, such as 'humanized” or “materialized” or similar terms should not be used.
- Nutrition and health claims on labels for breastmilk substitutes should not be permitted unless allowed by national legislation (WHA resolution 58.32 [2005]).
- Labels must contain explicit warnings on labels to inform consumers about the risks of contamination of powdered formula with pathogenic microorganisms (WHA resolution 58.32 [2005]).
- Labels must conform with WHO/FAO guidelines on safe preparation, storage and handling of powdered infant formula (WHA resolution 61.20 [2008]).

In line with the recommendation for exclusive breastfeeding in WHA resolution 54.2 [2001], all complementary foods must be labeled as suitable for use by infants from six months and not earlier.

== Implementation ==
The baby food industry has been the subject of pointed criticism from non-governmental organizations, international agencies and campaign groups for failing to abide by the Code. One of the largest food and beverage manufacturers in the world, the Swiss giant Nestlé, has been the subject of an international boycott campaign since 1977 for its milk-substitute marketing practices prior to and since the development of the Code (see Nestlé boycott).

On its own, the International Code is not legally enforceable. Companies are only subject to legal sanctions for failing to abide by the Code where it has been incorporated into the legislature of a nation state. Many countries have fully or partially adopted the Code as law. Other countries have no legislation on baby food marketing at all.

Code violations by baby food manufacturers are still widespread, especially (but not exclusively) in countries that have not implemented the Code as a national measure or where monitoring and enforcement is weak. The WHO, International Baby Food Action Network (IBFAN), UNICEF, Save the Children, Access to Nutrition Initiative (ATNI) and other international organizations perform monitoring of implementation of the Code across the world both independently and with governments.

== See also ==
- Baby Friendly Hospital Initiative
- Breastfeeding promotion
- Gabrielle Palmer (2009). The Politics of Breastfeeding. Pinter & Martin, UK. p. 424. ISBN 9781905177165.
