= Lactivism =

Activism in favor of breastfeeding

The International Breastfeeding Symbol

Lactivism (a portmanteau of "lactation" and "activism") is the doctrine or practice of vigorous action or involvement as a means of achieving a breastfeeding culture, sometimes by demonstrations, protests, etc. of breastfeeding. Supporters, referred to as "lactivists", seek to protest the violation of International Code of Marketing of Breast-milk Substitutes by formula companies and industry. Lactivism is a subject that has conjured both negative and positive connotation across the Western world since the term rose in popularity around 2015. The controversial conversation of Lactivism has been noted to be influenced by personal identity, contradictive research, large corporations and political agendas. Breastfeeding being a personal decision, challenges arise with the abundance of voices weighing in to support or discourage lactivism. The preached beliefs about whether a mother should breastfeed span from condemning mothers who do not, implying or outright saying they are physically harming their babies, to the opposite end of the spectrum claiming breastmilk and breast feeding have no benefits whatsoever. Amidst the conversation of lactivism there’s a failure to address or reference anyone, cultures, or countries outside of the Western world. By omitting other approaches, societal norms and reactions to lactivism it creates a narrow focus and excludes many breastfeeding and non-breastfeeding mothers.

== Overview ==
One form that lactivism takes is the staging of a "nurse-in" (a play on "sit-in"), which involves women gathering in public to nurse their children, usually to protest incidents in which a nursing mother was asked to cover up or leave a location because she was nursing. This form of lactivism is targeted more towards normalizing breastfeeding in the public eye. It is a form of a reactive peaceful protest, the effects of which have been largely successful.

During nurse-ins, nursing mothers often wear clothing with the International Breastfeeding Symbol on it, to show their solidarity.

Another form of lactivism is acting as support for mothers that wish to nurse. Lactivists provide information and share resources on successful nursing. lactivism also aims to explore the sexualization of the breast and how that effects mother’s ability to feed their child without stigma, taboo and negative consequences. Breastfeeding is like all other forms of infant care, yet it incorporates many challenges not only in private but in public as well. Lactivsm has been the word encompassing the efforts to making breastfeeding commonplace and accepted by society at large. As lactivism grew in notoriety there has been a pushback and response, calling into question the validity of the science surrounding breastfeeding, the unseen forces profiting off pushing lactation narratives, and the importance of all mother’s access to informed choice. The concern of those who’ve published work calling lactivsm into question, worry new mothers are being unknowingly influenced by corporations monetizing and commercializing off breastfeeding to save money. Technological advances of the breast pump have relieved corporations from having to provide longer and paid maternity leave for breastfeeding mothers. With women breast feeding there are no production costs for the government on formula, breast pumps generate big business, and mothers can provide breastmilk for their babies without having to leave their workplace. Pushback of lactivim aims to explore the forces behind mass campaigns, activism, and research encouraging all mothers to breastfeed.

Many lactivists choose to breastfeed their children over bottle feeding. Although breastfeeding is not always possible, plausible or chosen by mothers for various reasons.

There is a lack of accurate studies that support this statement but, it is claimed by some that breastfeeding provides a bonding experience superior to that of bottle feeding. Although, bonding experiences and to what amount it benefits a baby is extremely hard to measure due to the subjective nature of describing ‘bonding’.

Lactivists may also argue that bottle feeding is costlier than breastfeeding as it requires a multitude of items, and the money saved from breastfeeding can be spent on other useful items for the child.

Lactivism encompasses breastfeeding mother’s response to not having access to breastfeed were they choose, corporations and governmental agenda’s, and the culture of motherhood were some feel excluded and condemned for not breastfeeding. Lactivism encompasses many benefits, drawbacks, and some blind spots that need to be considered when addressing a practice used cross culturally with a deep and varied history. Lactivism has empowered and created social change for many women while on the same coin other women have been hurt and felt excluded by lactivisms core message.

== See also ==
- Breastfeeding in public
- Breastfeeding promotion
- List of breastfeeding activists
