= Breastfeeding Support for Indian Mothers =

Social media group

Breastfeeding Support for Indian Mothers or BSIM is a Facebook group that is popular for providing peer support for breastfeeding in India. With over 100,000 members as of 2019, the online community is managed by a team comprising over 45 volunteers, mothers, and certified lactation consultants. The group has been widely recognized for its efforts in Breastfeeding promotion, dispelling popular myths in Indian society around lactation and encouraging public nursing which is generally considered taboo in urban India.

== Core beliefs ==
The community is built around a set of foundational beliefs:

- Following WHO recommendations on breastfeeding.
- Avoid solids and water in the first six months.
- Breastfeeding is the natural way to feed and nourish the baby

== Achievements ==
- In March 2019, Adhunika Prakash, the group's founder, was honored as a 'Web Wonder Women' by the Ministry for Woman and Child Development. This recognition acknowledged her role in raising awareness about breastfeeding and advocating for policy changes to support it.
- Additionally, in 2019, Prakash was named one of the top five Community Leaders in residence by Facebook, and the group was awarded $100,000 to support community-building efforts.
