= World Breastfeeding Week =

Annual observance, 1–7 August

- World Breastfeeding Week 2009 Logo
- Begins: 1 August
- Ends: 7 August
- Frequency: Yearly
- Location: Worldwide
- Years active: 35
- Inaugurated: 1991
- Participants: Governments, Organization, Individuals
- Website: Official Homepage
- In the Support of Breastfeeding

World Breastfeeding Week (WBW) is an annual celebration which is held every year from 1 to 7 August in more than 120 countries. According to the 26 August data of WBW website, 540 events have been held worldwide by more than 79 countries with 488 organizations and 406,620 participants for the World Breastfeeding Week 2010.

Organized by World Alliance for Breastfeeding Action (WABA), the World Health Organization (WHO), and UNICEF, WBW came up with the goal to promote exclusive breastfeeding for the first six months of life which yields many health benefits, providing critical nutrients, protection from deadly diseases such as pneumonia and fostering growth and development for the first time in 1991.

== History ==
World Breastfeeding Week was first celebrated in 1992 by WABA and is now observed in over 120 countries by UNICEF, WHO and their partners including individuals, organizations, and governments. WABA itself was formed on 14 February 1991 with the goal to re-establish a global breastfeeding culture and provide support for breastfeeding everywhere.

WHO and the American Academy of Pediatrics (AAP) emphasize the value of breastfeeding for mothers as well as children. Both recommend exclusive breastfeeding for the first six months of life and then supplemented breastfeeding for at least one year and up to two years or more. WBW commemorates the Innocenti Declaration made by WHO and UNICEF in August 1990 to protect and support breastfeeding.

== See also ==
- Breastfeeding promotion
- Baby Friendly Hospital Initiative
- World Alliance for Breastfeeding Action (WABA)
- United Nations International Children's Emergency Fund (UNICEF)
- World Health Organization (WHO)
