= Chris Mulford =

American La Leche League health activist (1941–2011)

Chris Mulford (19 November 1941 – 23 August 2011) was a prominent advocate of breastfeeding in the United States and globally.

== Biography ==
Her father was a radio broadcaster and editor of a newsletter for dairy farmers. She was married to George Mulford and had two children, Zoe and Toby.

An avid musician, Mulford was active in community theater. She acted as sound designer for the Players Club of Swarthmore's 2007 productions of Reckless and Many Moons, and their 2010 production of Doubt, a Parable.

Mulford died on August 23, 2011, after suffering a stroke while hiking with her husband in Wyoming.

== Breastfeeding advocacy work ==
Mulford was a La Leche League leader. She started her work with mothers as a hospital nursery and maternity nurse in 1975. In 1985, she was in the first group who took the exam to become International Board Certified Lactation Consultants (IBCLCs). She was a second coordinator for World Alliance for Breastfeeding Action and Women and Work Task Force since the 1990s. She served on the board of the International Lactation Consultant Association (ILCA) for 5 years and was on the IAC of the World Alliance for Breastfeeding Action (WABA) from 1997.

Mulford became a regular long term volunteer for WABA, involved particularly in writing and documentation of a host of conferences, meetings and task force reports. Mulford became the second Women and Work Task Force Coordinator since the 1990s. She paved the way for the WABA-ILCA Fellowship by being an exemplar of a fellow, having spent several months each year in Penang volunteering at the WABA Secretariat almost annually. She would do in-house training among the staff, the local breastfeeding contacts, and also offered breastfeeding support to local mothers whenever the need arose.

She was a significant part of the lobby team at the International Labour Organization (ILO) conferences in 1999 and 2000 which helped to ensure that the new ILO Convention 183 on Maternity Protection (MP) recognised breastfeeding as a working woman's reproductive right and extended maternity leave from 12 to 14 weeks. Using her training ground at WABA on the MP issue, Mulford continued to be a key advocate for MP in the USA and wherever she went; and continued to be instrumental in developing MP resources for ILCA and the WABA Task Force.

Mulford was also an active member of the Women, Infants and Children (WIC) Program of South Jersey (eastern USA), co-chairman for the Business Case for Breastfeeding project, a Trustee of the New Jersey Breastfeeding Coalition (NJBFC) and Pennsylvania Breastfeeding Coalition. Linda Smith, of the Ohio Lactation Consultant Association, wrote, "Chris’s gentle wisdom and cross-discipline sharp thinking was a steadying force in many meetings, events and conferences. She was a true pioneer and role model for many of us."

Together with Kay Hoover, Mulford founded the Lactation Consultants in Private Practice conference, which was held for the first time in 1990 in Philadelphia, Pennsylvania.

"I believe breastfeeding is far more than a health issue. For me, it was a way to take care of myself and my babies, not just a way to feed them. It was an activity, a life stage, that shaped me as a person and permeated my relationships with my children, family, and friends" - Chris Mulford, February 2011.

== Writings ==
Mulford was known for her succinct and eloquent essays on breastfeeding related subjects.

- It's Great to Be a Mammal. (Russian translation.)
- Attitudes Can Change: Supporting Mothers and Their Babies in Public Nursing
- Breastfeeding is Always the First Line of Defense! at United States Breastfeeding committee (subscription required)
- Is breastfeeding really invisible, or did the health care system just choose not to notice it? World Alliance for Breastfeeding Action
- "Swimming Upstream: Breastfeeding Care in a Nonbreastfeedtng Culture", Journal of Obstetric, Gynecologic, & Neonatal Nursing, Volume 24, Issue 5, pages 464–474, June 1995 (subscription required)
