= Mothering (disambiguation) =

Mothering is acting like a mother.

Mothering also may refer to:

- Mothering (magazine), American, on motherhood
- Mothering, customs associated with the holiday of Mothering Sunday
- Mothering (language), or motherese, a way of speaking adapted to infants and toddlers comprehension

== See also ==
- The Mothering Heart (1913), film drama
