= Breastfeeding and mental health =

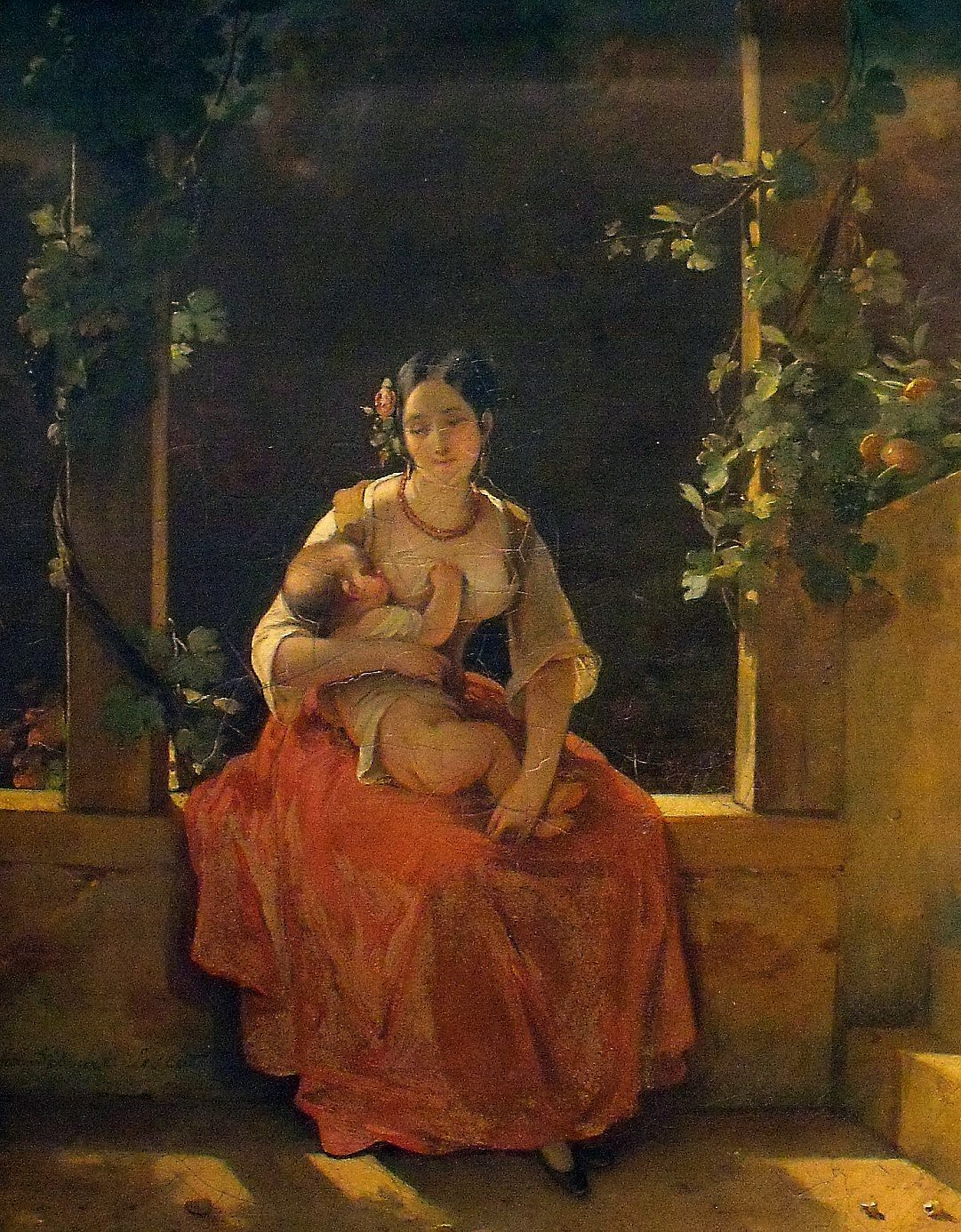
Young mother breastfeeding her child – 19th century painting by Hortense Haudebourt-Lescot

Breastfeeding and mental health is the relationship between postpartum breastfeeding and the mother's and child's mental health. Research indicates breastfeeding may have positive effects on the mother's and child's mental health, though there have been conflicting studies that question the correlation and causation of breastfeeding and maternal mental health. Possible benefits include improved mood and stress levels in the mother, lower risk of postpartum depression, enhanced social emotional development in the child, stronger mother-child bonding and more. Given the benefits of breastfeeding, the World Health Organization (WHO), the European Commission for Public Health (ECPH) and the American Academy of Pediatrics (AAP) suggest exclusive breastfeeding for the first six months of life. Despite these suggestions, estimates indicate 70% of mothers breastfeed their child after birth and 13.5% of infants in the United States are exclusively breastfed. Breastfeeding promotion and support for mothers who are experiencing difficulties or early cessation in breastfeeding is considered a health priority.

The exact nature of the relationship between breastfeeding and some aspects of mental health is still unclear to scientists. The causal links are uncertain due to the variability of how breastfeeding and its effects are measured across studies. There are complex interactions between numerous psychological, sociocultural and biochemical factors which are not yet fully understood.

== Breastfeeding and mother's mental health ==
=== Benefits on mood and stress levels ===
Some studies indicate that breastfeeding positively influences the mother's mental and emotional wellbeing as it improves mood and stress levels, and it is referred to as a 'stress buffer' for mothers during the postpartum period. However, other studies indicate that the stress of breastfeeding may have a negative impact on maternal mental health, especially when presented in an all-or-none, "Breast is best" manner. The activity facilitates a calmer psychological state and decreases feelings of anxiousness, negative emotions and stress. This is reflected in their physiological response to breastfeeding, where the mother's cardiac vagal tone modulation enhances, and blood pressure and heart rate decreases. The stress-buffering effect of breastfeeding results from the hormones oxytocin and prolactin. Mothers who breastfeed experience enhanced sleep duration and quality, while instances of sleep disturbances are decreased. The activity positively influences how mothers respond to social situations, which facilitates improved relationships and interactions. Mothers who engage in breastfeeding respond less to negative facial expressions (e.g. anger) and increase their response to positive facial expressions (e.g. happiness). Breastfeeding also help mothers feel confident and empowered given the knowledge that breastfeeding is beneficial to their child.

=== Postpartum depression ===
Postpartum depression is a mental health condition that can start during a women's pregnancy or come after the birth of her child. Statistics report that roughly 13 to 19 percent of women are affected by it. New mothers feel many negative emotions from this, depressed, hopeless, and/or worthless. It is a difficult time for those who suffer from this condition. The depressive episode during the postpartum period could be short-lived but it can also last up to two years. Postpartum depression in the potential to bring on more mental conditions for new mothers such as obsessive-compulsive disorder and/or anxiety. It is important for mothers and their partners to be watchful of any signs of PPD and how it affects the mother and the baby.

==== Effects of postpartum depression on breastfeeding ====
Studies indicate mothers with postpartum depression breastfeed their infant with lower frequency. Breastfeeding is an intimate activity with requires sustained mother-child physical contact and new mothers with symptoms of depression, including increased anxiety and tendency to avoid their child, are less likely to breastfeed their child. Postpartum depressive anxiety can decrease the mother's milk production which reduces the mother's ability to breastfeed her child. Mothers who take certain antidepressants to treat their depression are not recommended to breastfeed their child. The ingredients in the medication may be transferred to the child through breast milk and this may have detrimental consequences on their development. A woman should consult with her doctor to understand if her specific medication might be problematic in this regard. Mothers with symptoms of postpartum depression commonly report more difficulties with breastfeeding and lower levels of breastfeeding self-efficacy. Mothers with postpartum depression are more likely to have a negative perception of breastfeeding. They also initiate breastfeeding later, breastfeed less, and are more likely to cease breastfeeding early on during the postpartum period.

==== Effects of breastfeeding on postpartum depression ====
Breastfeeding may provide protection against postpartum depression or reduce some of its symptoms, and it is suggested that the benefits of breastfeeding may outweigh the benefits of antidepressants. The abstinence of breastfeeding, or decreased breastfeeding can increase the mother's likelihood of developing this mental disorder. Oxytocin and prolactin, which is released during breastfeeding, may improve the mother's mood and reduce her risk of depression. Breastfeeding women have lower rates of postpartum depression in comparison to formula-feeding women. Stress is one of the strongest risk factors in the development of depression, and as breastfeeding reduces stress it may decrease the risk of postpartum depression in mothers. Improved sleep patterns, improvements in mother-child bonding and an increased sense of self-efficacy due to breastfeeding also reduces the risk of developing depression.

==== Breastfeeding difficulties and postpartum depression ====
Breastfeeding difficulties and interruption lead to poorer maternal mood and increase the risk of developing postpartum depression. A 2011 study conducted by Nielson and colleagues found women who were unable to breastfeed were 2.4 times more likely to develop symptoms of depression 16 weeks after birth. Reasons for being unable to breastfeed include nipple pain, child temperamental issues, lack of milk production, breast surgery and mastitis. The lack of self-confidence or difficult experiences during breastfeeding is a common concern for mothers with postpartum depression. It is suggested that mothers who experience problems during breastfeeding require immediate additional support or should be screened for any signs of depression. Encouragement and guidance from professionals promotes self-efficacy and help mothers feel capable and empowered. As a child's temperament may affect the breastfeeding process, mothers are also encouraged to gain a deeper understanding of how infants feed during breastfeeding so potential problems can be anticipated and addressed.

==== Nature of relationship between breastfeeding and postpartum depression ====
There is a clear link between breastfeeding and postpartum depression; however, the exact nature of the relationship between breastfeeding and postpartum depression is unclear to scientists. This is due to several reasons including:

- Complex interactions between multiple physiological, sociocultural and psychological factors that are not yet fully understood.
- Different methods adopted by scientists to study this relationship may have led to different results.
- Conflicting scientific studies have indicated either that there is no link between breastfeeding and postpartum depression or that breastfeeding leads to increased risk of developing depression.

Recent reports indicate that a reciprocal or bidirectional relationship exists between breastfeeding and postpartum depression. That is, postpartum depression results in reduced breastfeeding activity and early cessation, and abstinence from breastfeeding or irregularity in practicing it increases risk of developing postpartum depression.

=== Mechanisms of action ===
The relationship between breastfeeding and the mother's mental health may be due to direct causes such as the following:

- Guilt, shame and/or disappointment: Mothers who are experiencing difficulties during breastfeeding or are unable to breastfeed may feel guilt, shame and disappointment as they believe they are unable to provide the child with what they require. This may lead to symptoms of postpartum depression.
- Negative perceptions of breastfeeding: The mother's perception of breastfeeding may affect her mood. Mothers with symptoms of postpartum depression are more likely to believe breastfeeding is restrictive and private. Depressed mothers tend to feel unsatisfied with breastfeeding and experience a decreased sense of self-efficacy when it comes to breastfeeding. Mothers who worry about breastfeeding are also more likely to be diagnosed with postpartum depression.
- Improved mother-infant bonding: Breastfeeding may also enhance the bond between the mother and child. This facilitates improved mental health.

==== Physiological mechanisms ====
The underlying physiological explanation of the benefits of breastfeeding on the mother's mental health is attributed to neuroendocrine processes. Breast milk contains lactogenic hormones, oxytocin and prolactin, which contain antidepressant effects and reduces anxiety. Prolactin is the primary hormone responsible for milk production and its levels are proportional to breastfeeding frequency and the child's milk requirements. Prolactin facilitates maternal behaviour, acts as an analgesic and decreases stress responsiveness. This hormone level is higher in women who breastfeed compared to women who do not breastfeed. Oxytocin decreases stress and promotes relaxation and nurturing behaviour. Prior to breastfeeding, oxytocin is released into the blood stream to aid in milk release. Oxytocin and prolactin are also released during nipple stimulation when the child suckles. The nerve fibres linked to the hypothalamus controls this release and the hormones are released in pulsating patterns. The increased levels of these hormones during breastfeeding have a beneficial effect on the mother's mental health. When exposed to physical or psychological stress, breastfeeding mothers also have a reduced cortisol response due to decreased production of stress hormones and improvements in their sleep. Physical contact during this activity attenuates the cortisol response. Postpartum depression and breastfeeding failure are also attributed to neuroendocrine mechanisms.

Postpartum depression is also closely associated with inflammation caused by postpartum pain or sleep deprivation, which are common experiences of motherhood. Breastfeeding decreases this inflammation response which is beneficial to the mother's mental health.

== Breastfeeding and child's mental health ==
=== Social and emotional health and development ===
Breastfeeding is associated with improved social and emotional health and development of the child. The breastfeeding activity induces calming and analgesic effects in the infant. During this activity, their heart and metabolic rates decrease and their sensitivity to pain is reduced.

Research indicate infants who are breastfed for more than 3 or 4 months develop fewer behavioural and conduct disorders. Breastfeeding may also facilitate decreased aggression and antisocial tendencies in infants; and it is suggested this effect carries on into adulthood. In a longitudinal study conducted by Merjonen and colleagues (2011), it was found adults who were not breastfed during infancy demonstrated higher levels of hostility and aggression. Infants who are breastfed also demonstrate more 'vigour' and intense reactions compared to bottle-fed infants. To signal to their parents and have their needs attended to, infants who are breastfed may display greater distress and frustration.

==== Mechanisms of action ====
The calming, analgesic effect and reduced sensitivity to pain is due to several factors:

- Suckling the nipple stimulates the child's oropharynx. This focuses the child's attention on the area and reduces attention to other influences.
- The act of suckling and intestinal adsorption of fat increases the hormone cholecystokinin, which enhances relaxation and pain relief.
- Breast milk is sweet and this stimulates the release of opioids which decreases the infant's sensitivity to pain.
- Physical contact stabilises blood glucose levels, body temperature and respiration rates, aids neurobehavioural self-regulation, reduces stress hormone release and blood pressure.
- Social interaction and physical contact promotes release of oxytocin.

The reduction of antisocial behaviour and aggression is attributed to increased levels of oxytocin in the infant during breastfeeding. Human breastmilk contains oxytocin and this hormone is also released in the child due to physical contact and warmth during breastfeeding. Increased levels of oxytocin promotes social and emotional development, and this facilitates lower levels of aggression and other antisocial behaviours.

The act of breastfeeding may also be an indicator of the mother's maternal behaviour. The abstinence or unnecessary prolonging of breastfeeding may suggest the mother is not mentally well and this contributes to increasingly antisocial behaviour in the child.

=== Autism spectrum disorder (ASD) ===
Research suggests breastfeeding may protect children from developing autism spectrum disorder (ASD), a mental disorder characterised by impaired social and communicative skills. Infants who are not breastfed, are breastfed later or breastfed for a short duration have a higher risk of being diagnosed with ASD. The exact physiological mechanism of this link is unclear but this association may be due to the lack of colostrum intake from breast milk which contains essential antibodies, protein and immune cells that are necessary for typical socio-emotional development and health.

However, scientists have emphasised the need to avoid assigning a causal role to breastfeeding in the development of ASD in infants. There is a possibility that children who are later diagnosed with ASD already possess behavioural traits which prevent regular breastfeeding activities. Children with ASD have reduced joint control, decreased social interaction or lack of cooperativeness; and this can lead to irregular breastfeeding patterns. The existence of research which do not show a relationship between breastfeeding and the development of ASD is also noted. For example, Husk and Keim (2015) conducted a large-scale survey with parents of 2 to 5 year old infants and found no significant correlation between ASD development and presence/absence of breastfeeding or length of breastfeeding duration. More studies are required to improve the understanding of breastfeeding and its link with ASD, and the underlying physiological mechanisms.

== Breastfeeding and mother-child bonding ==
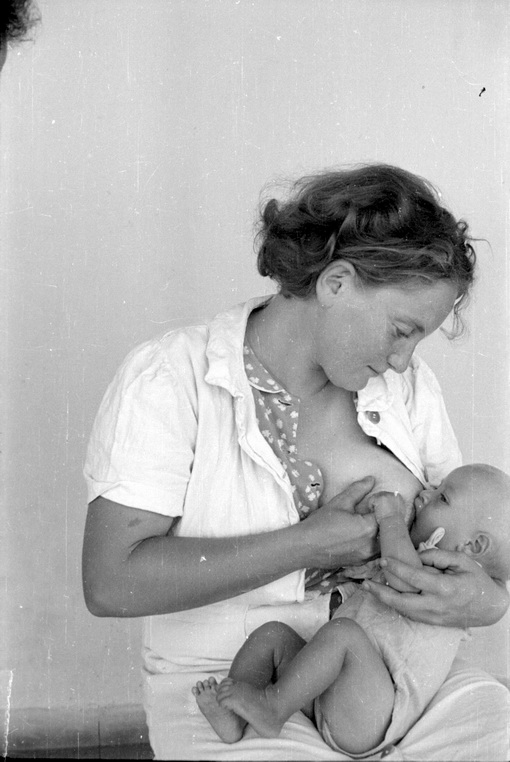
The mother and child's bond enhances during breastfeeding.

Research indicates that babies breastfed for more than 3 or 4 months develop fewer behavioral and conduct disorders. Breastfeeding enhances the emotional and social bond between the mother and child, and this attachment is important for their mental health. This bond increases the mother's and child's abilities to control their emotions, reduce the stress response and encourages healthy social development in the child. Physical contact during breastfeeding increases levels of oxytocin in the mother and child, which improves the mother-child bond. Breastfed infants become more dependent on their mothers and develop a deep social and emotional connection. Likewise, breastfeeding facilitates mothers' emotional connection with their child and thus mothers generally display more warmth and sensitivity.

Compared to non-breastfeeding mother-child pairs, in breastfeeding mother-child pairs:

- Mothers are more responsive and sensitive to their infant's needs.
- Mothers spend more time and attention on their infant.
- Mothers generally touch and speak to their infant more.
- Infants demonstrate a greater sense of 'attachment security' and lower 'attachment disorganisation.
- Infants suckle their mother's breast longer than with bottles.
- Mothers and infants spend more time gazing at each other.
- Mothers are more positive and smile at their child more.

Brain imaging research indicates breastfeeding mothers who listen to their infant crying demonstrate greater activity in limbic regions of the brain. This suggests the mother's enhanced emotional, empathetic and sensitive response to their child, which supports mother-infant bonding.

Studies which do not demonstrate a significant relationship between breastfeeding and mother-infant bonding exist. For example, Britton and colleagues (2006) did not find a significant association between breastfeeding and mother-infant bonding but found that mothers displaying more sensitivity were more likely to breastfeed than bottlefeed. This suggests that the mother's sensitivity may have a more direct effect on mother-child bonding as more sensitive mothers are more likely to breastfeed and display greater emotional sensitivity.

== See also ==
- Breastfeeding in public
