= Maternal bond =

Relationship between mother and child

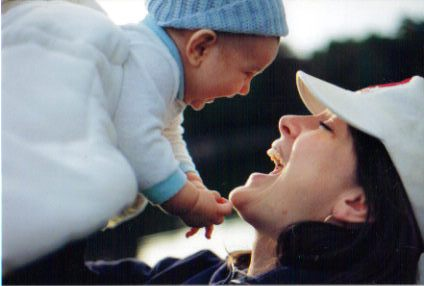
A human mother holds up her child.

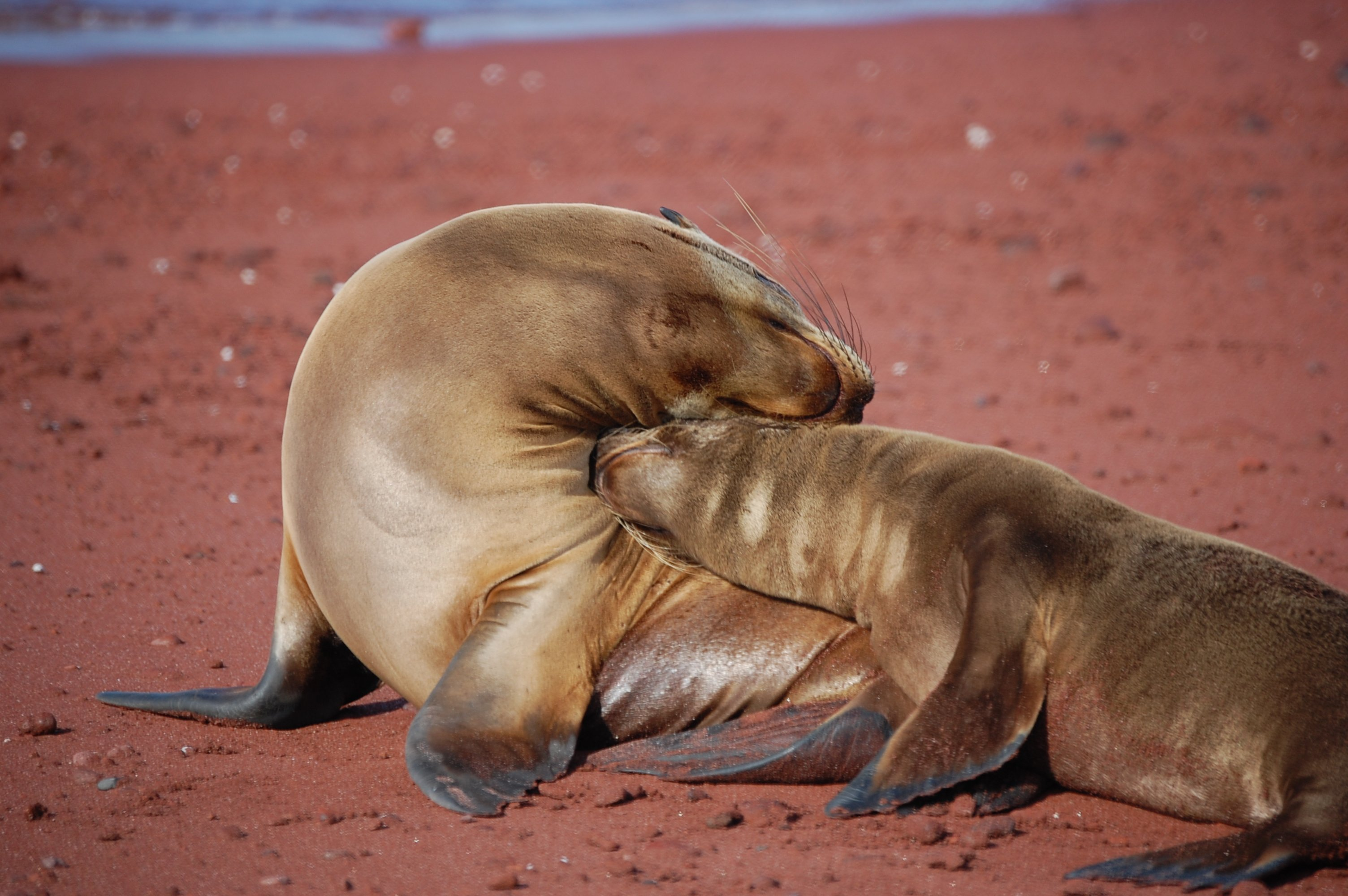
Mother sea lion and pup.

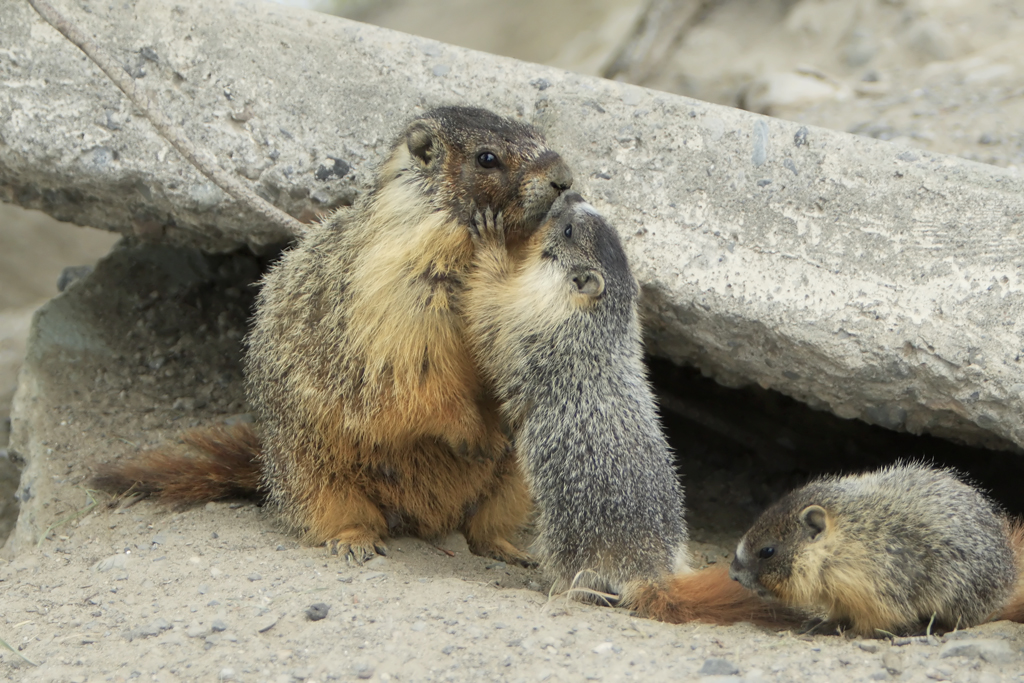
A mother yellow-bellied marmot kissing her pup.

A maternal bond is the relationship between a biological mother/caregiver and her child or baby. While typically associated with pregnancy and childbirth, a maternal bond may also develop in cases later on in life where the child is unrelated, such as in the case of an adoptee or a case of blended family.

Both physical and emotional factors influence the mother-child bonding process. In separation anxiety disorder, a child becomes fearful and nervous when away from a loved one, usually a parent or other caregiver. New mothers do not always experience instant love toward their child. Instead, the bond can strengthen over time, or fail to develop. Bonds can take hours, days, weeks, or months to develop.

== Pregnancy ==
The maternal bond between a woman and her biological child usually begins to develop during pregnancy. The pregnant female often adapts her lifestyle to suit the needs of the developing infant—for example, by eating or refraining from eating certain foods or undertaking or avoiding certain activities. At around 18 to 25 weeks, the mother begins to feel the fetus moving. Similar to seeing her child for the first time in an ultrasound scan, this experience often leads the mother to feel more attached to her child.

Once sufficiently developed, the developing fetus has some awareness of the mother's heartbeat and voice and can respond to touch or movement and hear sounds from the surrounding environment. By the seventh month of pregnancy, two-thirds of women report a strong maternal bond with their unborn child.

Some mothers who did not want the pregnancy may not have a close relationship with their child due to a sense of foreignness/unfamiliarity. They are more likely to suffer from postpartum depression or other mental health problems and less likely to breastfeed.

== Childbirth and post pregnancy ==
Childbirth is an experience that can strengthen the mother and child bond. Factors such as a traumatic birth, the mother's childhood, medical stress, lack of support and the influence of a spouse or partner/family or socioeconomic factors like poverty can weaken the bond.

Physical contact between infants and caregivers is very important to building, and bonding is still possible for infants which require hospital care, which reduces the opportunities for physical contact—for example, those infants who are born prematurely. Parents and premature infants can still bond by cuddling and hugging, by touching in and around incubators, and by playing, with skin-to-skin forms of contact particularly effective.

Emotional bonding theory first appeared in the mid-1970s and bonding theories outlining descriptions and causes of good bonding and poor bonding were established understandings by the mid-1980s.

== Oxytocin ==
Production of oxytocin during childbirth and lactation increases parasympathetic activity. Thus, anxiety is theoretically reduced. Maternal oxytocin circulation is said to predispose women to bond and show bonding behavior, although this has been disputed.

Breastfeeding is also strongly believed to foster the bond, via touch, response and mutual gazing, as it stimulates the experience with the baby gazing up and down the mother and drinking from the mother's nipples.

== Maternal separation anxiety ==
Beginning at 9–10 months of age, when infants begin to crawl, and then when they begin to walk around 12 months of age, they begin to develop capacities to physically explore the world away from their mother. These capacities bring with them separation anxiety as the infant becomes more vulnerable away from mother. This newly acquired motor development parallels infants' intellectual curiosity, and cognitive and language development as they begin to point and name, and jointly attend with mothers to their environment beginning by 9–10 months. Most parents welcome these explorations and this increased independence. However, in the context of maternal depression, trauma or disturbed bonding in her own early life, some mothers have significant difficulty in tolerating the exploration and/or the infant's anxiety.

This separation anxiety increases when infants and toddlers feel threatened or socially reference their mothers for reassurance. The research claimed out that mothers, for example, with histories of violence exposure and post-traumatic stress show less activity in the medial prefrontal cortex, a brain area that helps to temper and contextualize fear responses, and thus are likely unable to extinguish their fear response upon watching a videotaped mother-toddler separation scene in a magnetic resonance imaging scanner.

== Child separation anxiety ==
Inevitably, children who have rarely been separated from their mother become anxious when separated for extended periods. This is most commonly experienced when starting to attend school. Separation anxiety can cause children to be unable to be open to new experiences such as attending school regularly. There is a relationship between child separation anxiety and school refusal.

Attachment happens after childbirth and does not form and is likely more fluid as people go further in later in life; this anxiety can reoccur if mothers have to leave their family unit to work. In both cases, the child's anxiety (and that of the parents) can be reduced by priming, i.e. preparing the child for the experience before its occurrence and by creating and maintaining dialogue and connection between the absent parent and child during the separation. Many children may experience such anxiety in various forms. Child separation anxiety may be a learned behaviour which can occur over time initiating from innate fears of separation or trauma.

== See also ==
- Postpartum confinement
- Human bonding
- Paternal bond
- Cinderella effect
- Mother's boy
- Babywearing, co-sleeping
- Breastfeeding and mental health
