= Mothering (magazine) =

American parenting magazine

- Founded: 1976
- Final issue: March–April 2011
- Country: United States
- Based in: Santa Fe, New Mexico
- Language: English
- ISSN: 0733-3013

Mothering was a magazine published from 1976 to 2011. Its tagline was "the magazine of natural family living" and it had a printed circulation of 100,000. The magazine was located in southern Colorado from 1976 to 1978, in Albuquerque, New Mexico from 1978 to 1984 and in Santa Fe, New Mexico from 1984 to 2011.

== History ==
Mothering was founded by Adeline Eavenson (now Cranson) in Ridgeway, Colorado in 1976. In 1980, the magazine was sold to Peggy O'Mara and John McMahon. In 1990, Peggy O'Mara became the sole owner of Mothering and was its editor and publisher until 2011. The November–December 2010 issue was the last printed issue of Mothering. The last issue of Mothering magazine was the March–April 2011 issue.

== Content ==
The magazine covered alternative childbirth options, and advocated breastfeeding, alternative education, homeschooling, co-sleeping and open discussion about the risks and benefits of vaccination. Journalist Emily Bazelon, who writes about women, family, and legal issues, described the magazine as "my own barometer of granola parenting gone too far".

In 2006, Mothering sponsored a contest that solicited artwork to create an international symbol for breastfeeding. The winning design, chosen from more than 500 entries, was announced in November 2006.

In 2001, Mothering featured a cover story about AIDS denialist and HIV+ mother, Christine Maggiore, who was pregnant with her daughter at the time and refused to take any anti-HIV drugs to protect her unborn daughter from becoming infected with HIV. Maggiore's daughter caught HIV from her mother and died at the age of 3 from AIDS-related complications; Maggiore herself died six years later.

== Publications ==
Mothering has published books through a division of Simon & Schuster:

- Mothering Magazine's Having a Baby, Naturally: The Mothering Magazine Guide to Pregnancy and Childbirth, Peggy O'Mara. Atria publishing (2003) ISBN 978-0-7434-3963-3
- Natural Family Living: The Mothering Magazine Guide to Parenting, Peggy O'Mara. Atria publishing (2000) ISBN 978-0-671-02744-5

== Web presence ==
Peggy O'Mara founded mothering.com in 1995 and the Mothering Forums in 1996. By 2011, mothering.com had 1.5 million unique visitors each month and was the largest online forum for parents. In July 2011, O'Mara sold mothering.com, to Huddler (Collacomm, Inc) to pay print magazine debts that had accumulated during the Great Recession. Huddler subsequently sold mothering.com to Vertical Scope in Toronto, Canada. Mothering.com has not been associated with Mothering magazine since 2011.
