= World Alliance for Breastfeeding Action =

World Alliance for Breastfeeding Action (WABA)
- Founded: 14 February 1991; 35 years ago
- Type: Network of People
- Purpose: Innocenti Declaration
- Location: Worldwide
- Key people: Derrick and Pat Jelliffe
- Website: Official Website

The World Alliance for Breastfeeding Action (WABA) is a network of people working on a global scale to eliminate obstacles to breastfeeding and to act on the Innocenti Declaration. The groups within this alliance tackle the problems from a variety of perspectives or point of views, such as consumer advocates, mothers, and lactation consultants.

Among the various organizations and individuals involved in the creation of WABA, Derrick and Pat Jelliffe, two experts in tropical paediatrics and infant nutrition, were instrumental in its founding and in the launching of some of its more visible early initiatives.

WABA organises the World Breastfeeding Week, held annually August 1 through the 7th, to put together the efforts of all breastfeeding advocates, governments, and the public in more than 170 countries.

== Campaigns ==
Several campaigns are associated with the WABA:

1991 to present - The Baby Friendly Hospital Initiative (BFHI) is a joint campaign by UNICEF and the World Health Organization, and focuses mainly on hospital practices, implementing the principles of the Innocenti Declaration.

1993 - This campaign tackled the problem of developing mother-friendly workplaces. In general, they wanted mothers to be able to combine breastfeeding with their working atmosphere.

1994 - The main focus of the '94 campaign was to implement again the International Code of Marketing of Breast-milk Substitutes in all countries to meet the demands of the Innocenti Declaration.

== International Code of Marketing of Breast-milk Substitutes ==
International Code of Marketing of Breast-milk Substitutes (Rules for industries, health workers, and governments to regulate the promotion of baby products through marketing):

1. No advertising of any of these products to the public.
2. No free samples to mothers.
3. No promotion of products in health care facilities, including the distribution of free or low-cost supplies.
4. No company sales representatives to advise mothers.
5. No gifts or personal samples to health workers.
6. No words or pictures idealizing artificial feeding, or pictures of infants on labels of infant milk containers.
7. Information to health workers should be scientific and factual.
8. All information on artificial infant feeding, including that on labels, should explain the benefits of breastfeeding, and the costs and hazards associated with artificial feeding.
9. Unsuitable products, such as sweetened condensed milk, should not be promoted for babies.
10. Manufacturers and distributors should comply with the Code's provisions even if countries have not adopted laws or other measures.
