= Baby Friendly Hospital Initiative =

World Health Organization initiative in India since 1992

The Baby Friendly Hospital Initiative (BFHI), also known as Baby Friendly Initiative (BFI), is a worldwide programme of the World Health Organization (WHO) and the United Nations Children's Fund (UNICEF), launched in 1992 in India following the adoption of the Innocenti Declaration on breastfeeding promotion in 1990. The initiative is a global effort for improving the role of maternity services to enable mothers to breastfeed babies for the best start in life. It aims at improving the care of pregnant women, mothers and newborns at health facilities that provide maternity services for protecting, promoting and supporting breastfeeding, in accordance with the International Code of Marketing of Breast-milk Substitutes.

== Background ==
UNICEF, WHO, and many national government health agencies recommend that babies are breastfed exclusively for their first six months of life. Studies have shown that breastfed babies are less likely to suffer from serious illnesses, including gastroenteritis, asthma, eczema, and respiratory and ear infections. Adults who were breastfed as babies may be less likely to develop risk factors for heart disease such as obesity and high blood pressure. There are benefits for mothers too: women who don't breastfeed have increased risk of developing heart disease, hypertension, diabetes, high cholesterol, breast cancer, ovarian cancer and hip fractures in later life. The BFHI aims to increase the numbers of babies who are exclusively breastfed worldwide, a goal which the WHO estimates could contribute to avoiding over a million child deaths each year, and potentially many premature maternal deaths as well.

== Criteria ==
The criteria for a hospital's Baby Friendly accreditation (2018) include:

Critical management procedures

1a. Comply fully with the International Code of Marketing of Breast-milk Substitutes and relevant World Health Assembly resolutions.

1b. Have a written infant feeding policy that is routinely communicated to staff and parents.

1c. Establish ongoing monitoring and data-management systems.

2. Ensure that staff have sufficient knowledge, competence and skills to support breastfeeding.

Key clinical practices

3. Discuss the importance and management of breastfeeding with pregnant women and their families.

4. Facilitate immediate and uninterrupted skin-to-skin contact and support mothers to initiate breastfeeding as soon as possible after birth.

5. Support mothers to initiate and maintain breastfeeding and manage common difficulties.

6. Do not provide breastfed newborns any food or fluids other than breast milk, unless medically indicated.

7. Enable mothers and their infants to remain together and to practise rooming-in 24 hours a day.

8. Support mothers to recognize and respond to their infants' cues for feeding.

9. Counsel mothers on the use and risks of feeding bottles, teats and pacifiers.

10. Coordinate discharge so that parents and their infants have timely access to ongoing support and care.

The program also restricts use by the hospital of free formula or other infant care aids provided by formula companies and recommends that when formula is medically needed, it should be given in a small cup or spoon, rather than a bottle and should only be used to supplement breastfeeding.

As of 2011, approximately 15,000 facilities in more than 152 countries had been inspected and accredited as "Baby-Friendly." The number of accredited hospitals has continued to grow. As of 2019, a survey found that 28% of the hospitals in the US were registered as Baby Friendly.

== Recommended alternatives ==
The World Health Organization recommends that if a mother is unable to breastfeed, chooses not to breastfeed, or if her baby (often premature) shows signs that it isn't getting enough breast-milk, a healthy wet nurse or milk from a donor is a healthy alternative to formula. A special formula is manufactured for premature babies, although the World Health Organization recommends it only if breast-milk is medically not an option such as if a premature baby has to be fed formula through a tube to maintain a healthy weight. The World Health Organization advocates the importance of a baby being close to its mother whenever possible even if the mother does not breastfeed.

== Regional schemes ==
=== Canada ===
In Canada, the provinces of Quebec and New Brunswick have mandated the implementation of the BFHI. All public health units in Ontario have been required to work towards having BFI designation since 2011. In 2012, the Ministry of Health and Long Term Care in Ontario added BFI status to their progress indicators for Public Health Units thus requiring all Public Health Units in Ontario to begin implementation of BFI. Other provinces and territories are implementing strategies at regional and local levels. As of 2008, 18 health care facilities (9 hospitals & birthing centres and 9 community health services) had been designated "Baby-Friendly" across the country. The B.C. Women's Hospital and Health Centre has been recognized as a breast-feeding and "baby-friendly" hospital by the World Health Organization (WHO) and UNICEF since 2008. It is the largest hospital in Canada to receive the designation.

=== China ===
China, now has more than 6,000 Baby-Friendly Hospitals, exclusive breastfeeding in rural areas rose from 29 per cent in 1992 to 68 per cent in 1994; in urban areas, the increase was from 10 per cent to 48 per cent.

=== Cuba ===
In Cuba, 49 of the country's 56 hospitals and maternity facilities have been designated as "baby-friendly". In the six years following the initiation of the BFHI program, the rate of exclusive breastfeeding at four months almost tripled - from 25 per cent in 1990 to 72 per cent in 1996.

=== Hong Kong ===
In Hong Kong several hospitals have shown interest in being designated Baby Friendly. However, only Queen Elizabeth Hospital has advanced past the Award of Level 2 Participation stage and is well on its way to receiving BFHI accreditation.

=== Ireland ===
The BFHI started in Ireland in 1998 under the auspices of the Irish Health Promoting Hospitals Network (a WHO programme). The BFHI in Ireland became an independent registered charity in mid-2016 and changed their name to Baby Friendly Health Initiative. They offer two levels - a participation or membership level in which maternity facilities are encouraged to implement the standards and network with other maternity facilities but with no external assessment process, and the designation level where there is external assessment and on-going monitoring to ensure the standards are met and sustained.

=== Sweden ===
Sweden is considered the global leader in terms of BFHI implementation: four years after the programme was introduced in 1993, all of the then 65 maternity centres in the country had been designated "baby-friendly".

=== Taiwan ===
In 2014 78.60% of babies were born in BFHI hospitals. Between 2001 and 2013, the increase in certified hospitals was from 38 to 176.

=== United Kingdom ===
The UNICEF UK Baby Friendly Initiative was launched in the United Kingdom in 1995. The Initiative works with the National Health Service (NHS) to ensure a high standard of care for pregnant women and breastfeeding mothers and babies in hospitals and community health settings. The Baby Friendly Initiative accredits health-care facilities that adopt internationally recognised best practice standards for breastfeeding. During each stage of accreditation, the Initiative provides support as facilities implement standards relating to policies and procedures, staff education, effective auditing, educating pregnant women and mothers, and other relevant areas.

In 1998, its principles were extended to cover the work of community health-care services with the Seven Point Plan for the Promotion, Protection and Support of Breastfeeding in Community Health Care Settings. It has been estimated that if all babies were breastfed, over £35m would be saved by the NHS in England and Wales each year in treating gastroenteritis alone. Despite that, in 2013 breastfeeding rates in the UK were amongst the lowest in Europe: 78 per cent of babies born in the UK were breastfed at birth, falling to 63 per cent at one week. Only one in five babies still received breastmilk at six months.

In 2013 the success of the initiative in Scotland showed that 90% of Scottish mothers gave birth in a UNICEF-accredited Baby Friendly hospital. This compared to 30% of mothers in England, 58% for Wales and 57% in Northern Ireland.

In 2022, 600,000 newborn babies were supported in the UK, and UNICEF reported that "the majority of maternity units (93%) and health visiting services (90%) across the UK are now working towards Baby Friendly accreditation, and new neonatal and children's centre standards have been introduced to help more services improve care."

=== United States ===
The first hospitals verified as Baby-Friendly in the US were on the Pacific Coast. The first US hospital to receive this designation was Evergreen Hospital Medical Center, in Kirkland, Washington, which was certified in September 1996. All of these early adopters were able to achieve 100% breastfeeding initiation rates. In New York City, the Harlem Hospital Center was the first hospital to receive the "Baby Friendly" certification granted by Baby-Friendly USA for the city in 2008. In 2011, New York University Langone Medical Center became the second hospital to receive the Baby-Friendly Hospital designation in New York City.

The Johns Hopkins Hospital in Maryland describes the process of receiving the Baby Friendly designation.

It involves changing long-standing policies, protocols and behaviors. The Baby-Friendly Hospital Initiative includes a very rigorous credentialing process that includes a two-day site visit, where assessors evaluate policies, community partnerships and education plans, as well as interview patients, physicians and staff members.

As of 2 May 2018, the United States had 512 hospitals that hold the Baby-Friendly designation. This translates to 24.57% of annual births. As of 2019, 28% of hospitals in the U.S. have been accredited by the WHO.

== Criticism and responses to criticism ==
One group of authors expressed concerns in a paper published in October 2016. It questioned whether full compliance with the ten steps of the initiative might inadvertently lead to the promotion of potentially hazardous practices and/or counterproductive outcomes. Specific concerns described in this paper included increased risk of sudden unexpected postnatal collapse, rigidly-enforced rooming-in practices leading to exhausted or heavily medicated mothers caring for newborns, and an unnecessary ban on pacifier use.

A 2016 systematic review examined the impact of BFHI implementation on breastfeeding and child health outcomes worldwide and in the United States. The authors suggested that following the BFHI Ten Steps had a positive impact on short, medium, and long-term breastfeeding outcomes. However, they warned their results for the United States explaining "All of the United States BFHI evidence comes from observational studies, the vast majority of which are of very low or low quality. Although there is consistent empirical evidence that BFHI has led to improvements in breastfeeding outcomes in the very short and short terms, its impact on BF outcomes in the long term remains unclear". Looking at 58 studies, the review found that community support was the key to long-term sustainability of breastfeeding that was initiated in the BFHI hospital setting.

A study published in the Journal of Pediatrics in 2019 showed that increased rates of implementation of the BFHI were temporally associated with a decrease in the rate of infant deaths in the first six days after birth. The authors said that their findings dispelled the suggestion that hospital-based breastfeeding initiatives might increase infant death from asphyxiation. The authors did not discuss the other potential harms to mother and baby that critics have raised, such as increased incidence of neonate hospital admission due to dehydration and poor maternal mental health outcomes.

A 2017 study focusing on hospital readmission among infants based on method of feeding raised concerns that exclusive breastfeeding is linked to double the rate of readmission to hospital among neonates as compared to formula feeding. Critics of the Baby Friendly Initiative point to this type of data and several anecdotal stories of babies harmed at hospitals following the Baby Friendly Initiative as evidence that the current guidelines are potentially harmful and not meeting the needs of mother or baby. Additionally, critics point to the Initiative not requiring hospitals to inform mothers about the risks of exclusive breastfeeding, and only discussing the risks of not breastfeeding, as providing insufficient information to allow mothers to make a fully-informed decision regarding infant feeding choices.

A 2021 article outlines the harms caused by insufficient milk intake in neonates, and discusses accidental neonatal starvation alongside current scientific evidence while offering a historical and policy perspective on the rise of the Baby Friendly initiative in part as a response to inappropriate advertising of formula in Africa, which led to poor outcomes among children who traditionally would have been breastfed.

A 2021 review of systematic reviews raised further doubts about some of the claims raised in support of the Baby Friendly Initiative, as it was found that the majority of cited studies concluding benefits of implementation were of low or very low quality. The authors raised a number of concerns surrounding quantification of long-term outcomes on maternal and child health apart from breastfeeding initiation, and suggested that outcomes may differ substantially among poor and wealthy countries. Additionally, the authors described potential negative outcomes associated with full implementation of the Baby Friendly Initiative, including promoting unrealistic breastfeeding expectations, mothers feeling pressured to breastfeed, and increased feelings of maternal guilt. Further high quality studies were recommended to evaluate both long-term breastfeeding outcomes and other aspects of maternal health.

Notably, despite the substantial criticism regarding the increased pressure and anxiety felt by mothers due to Baby Friendly implementation, the current guidelines provided by Baby Friendly USA make no mention of the importance of maternal mental health in the context of a healthy baby, nor do they have any indication of mental health experts having been involved in creating or editing the implementation guidelines.
