= Breastfeeding in public =

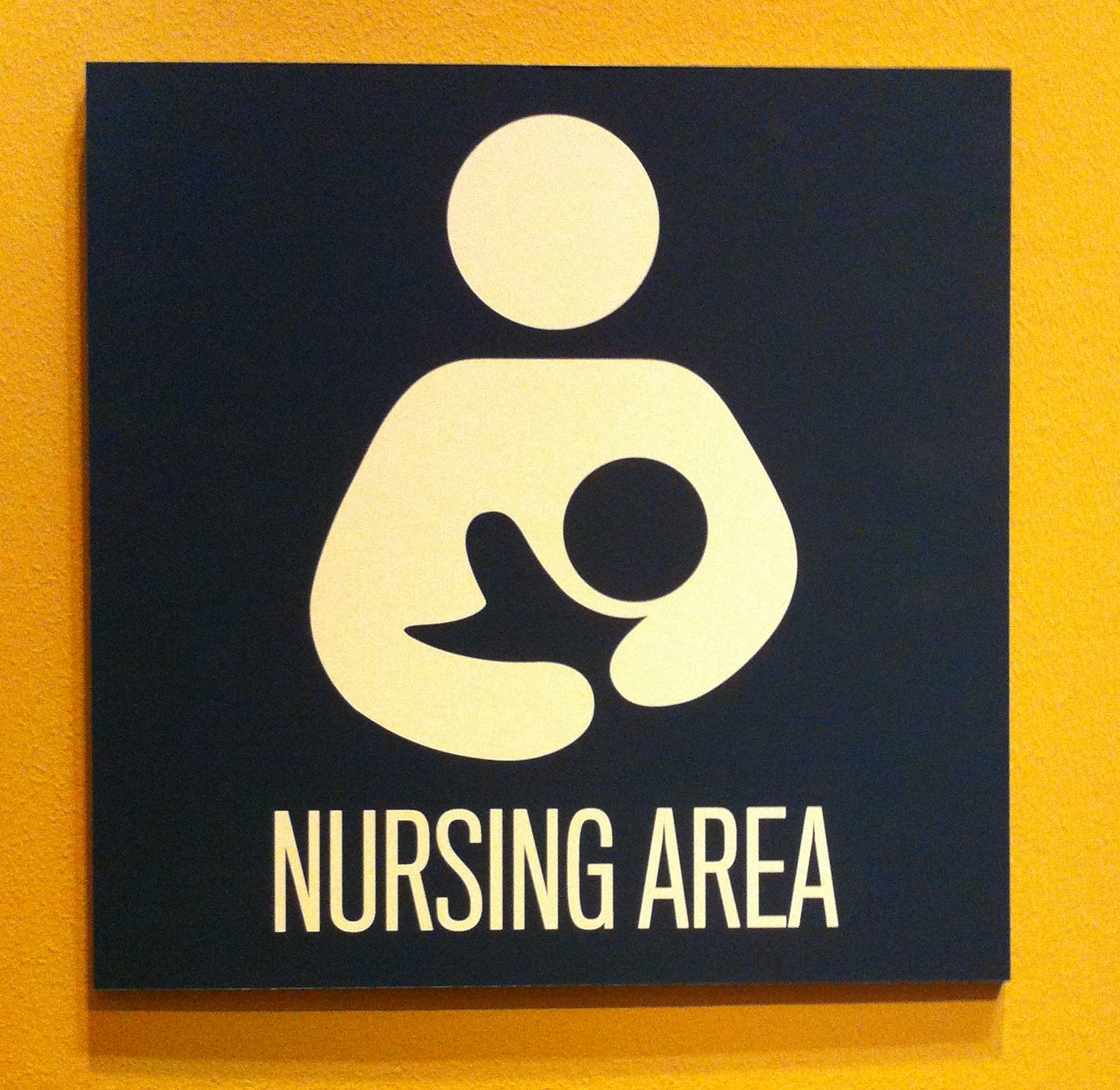
International breastfeeding sign to designate a private nursing area

The social attitudes toward and legal status of breastfeeding in public vary widely in cultures around the world. In many countries, both in the Global South and in a number of Western countries, breastfeeding babies in open view of the general public is common and generally not regarded as an issue. In many parts of the world including Australia, some parts of the United States and Europe, along with some countries in Asia, women have an explicit legal right to nurse in public and in the workplace.

The prevalence of breastfeeding in public in a particular country is primarily due to factors such as legal restrictions, cultural values, age of the baby, social norms, and women's breastfeeding attitudes and knowledge. There is some evidence that mothers who breastfeed in public are more likely to continue breastfeeding for longer than those who do not. Embarrassment resulting from societal disapproval is often cited as a major reason for not breastfeeding in public. This can result in nursing women avoiding spending time in public, carrying expressed breast milk with them, or using infant formula when away from home.

Even though the practice may be legal or socially accepted, some mothers may nevertheless be reluctant to expose a breast in public to breastfeed, mainly due to actual or potential objections by other people, negative comments, or harassment. It is estimated that around 63% of mothers across the world have publicly breast-fed. The media have reported a number of incidents in which workers or members of the public have objected to or forbidden women breastfeeding. Some mothers avoid the negative attention and choose to move to another location; some mothers have protested their treatment, and have taken legal action or engaged in protests. Protests have included a public boycott of the offender's business, organizing a "nurse-in" or a breastfeeding flash mob, in which groups of nursing mothers gather at the location where the complaint originated and nursed their babies at the same time. In response, some companies have apologised and agreed to train their employees.

== Attitudes by country and continent ==
=== Africa ===
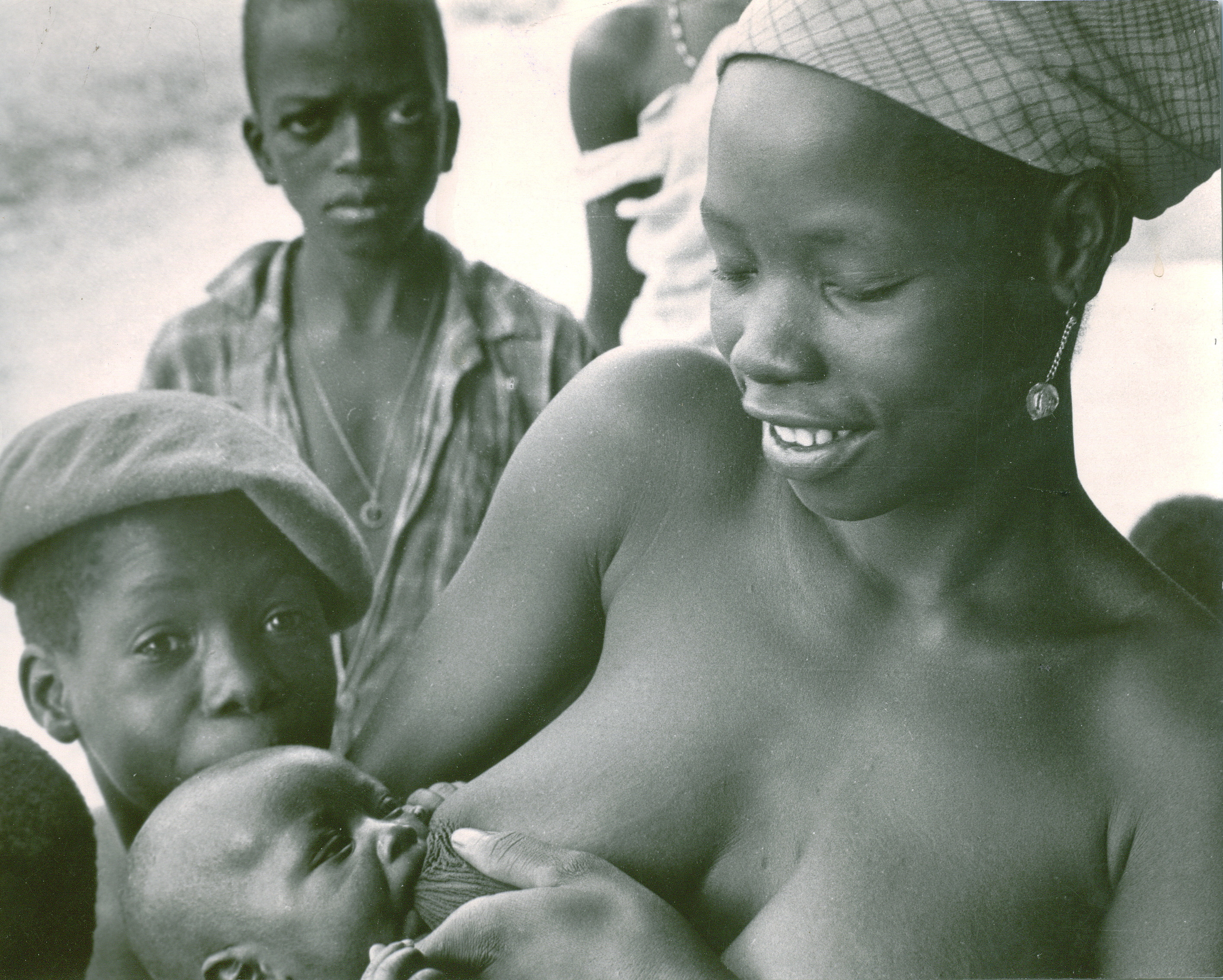
A new mother in Kabala, Sierra Leone in West Africa nurses outdoors.

In many areas of Africa, breastfeeding in public is the norm. Babies are commonly carried on a mother's back in a length of cloth and merely moved to the front for feeding. The nursing mother may shield the view of the baby nursing, but generally no attempt is made to hide the baby and the mother's breast from view. When a baby is seen crying in public, it is assumed that the woman with the infant is not the child's mother, since it is normally thought that she would feed the infant if she were the mother.

==== Morocco ====
Public breastfeeding is legal and widely accepted.

==== Sierra Leone ====
Sierra Leone has the highest infant mortality rate in the world. During a goodwill trip to the country, actress Salma Hayek breastfed on-camera a hungry week-old infant whose mother could not produce milk. She said she did it to reduce the stigma associated with breastfeeding and to encourage infant nutrition.

=== Asia ===
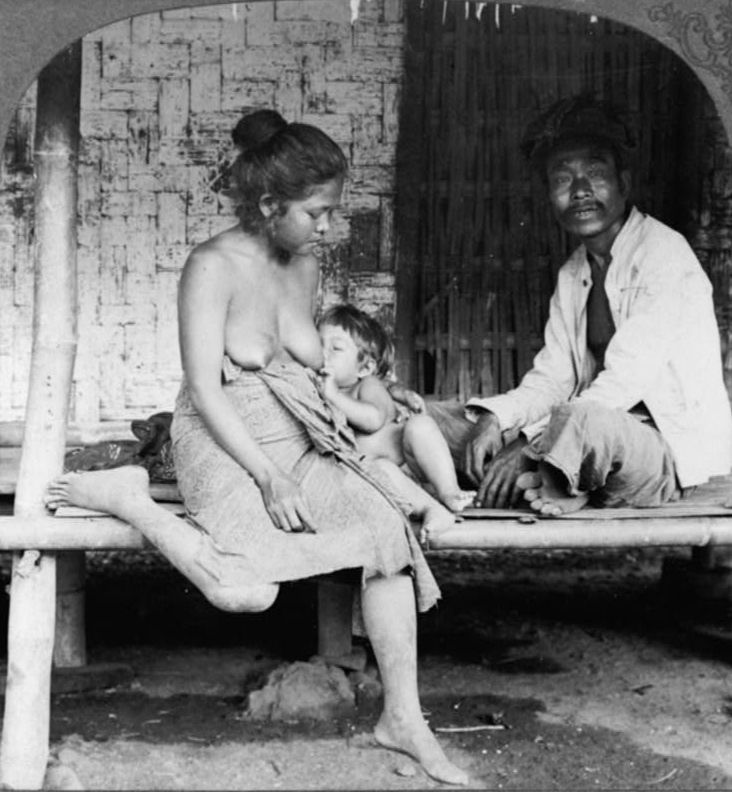
Sundanese woman breastfeeding in public

==== China ====
Breastfeeding in public in China was historically constrained by traditional cultural and social norms. In ancient China, if a woman exposed the skin below her neck she was regarded as a dissolute woman. Traditional Chinese culture also paid much attention to the sexual role of breasts, and this has led to many women in China still regarding it as unacceptable to expose their breasts in public.

China has no law that specifically allows women to breastfeed in public. There have also been examples of social media posts going viral that attempt to shame individuals found to be breastfeeding in public. A fear of this has contributed to the low rate of breastfeeding amongst Chinese mothers. To promote breastfeeding, hundreds of mothers in China have participated in the "Big Latch On", an international event where women breastfeed their child in public together.

In Shanghai, breastfeeding in public is considered embarrassing by some, but it is also accepted by many. There have been calls for the establishment of baby-care facilities in public places.

==== India ====
India has no legal statute dealing with breastfeeding in public. Instead India's Maternity Benefit (Amendment) Act, 2017, entitles breastfeeding mothers to crèche facilities at many workplaces, and there are laws in some Indian states that require employers to provide time and facilities for breastfeeding. However, not all employers provide these facilities and they are rarely available to women in public places. As a result, breastfeeding often takes place in public, typically on public transport, in secluded corners, under trees, in cars or parking lots, or in public toilets. Women breastfeeding in public often experience embarrassment due to staring strangers.

Prevalence and social acceptance vary from region to region. Breastfeeding in public is not a norm in higher sections of society, but is quite common in the lower economic sections.

In rural India it is completely acceptable, but more difficulties are experienced in urban areas. A survey carried out in 2019 indicated that around 81% of mothers across India do not like breastfeeding in public, mainly due to a lack of hygiene and the stares of others.

==== Iran ====
Before the 1979 Iranian Revolution there were no restrictions on breastfeeding in public in Iran. Currently breastfeeding is not usually carried out in public unless the baby is covered. In some places, such as the capital Tehran, the municipality has set up private "mother and child" rooms for breastfeeding and diaper changing to help boost the population.

==== Malaysia ====
It is widely accepted for mothers to breastfeed in public in Malaysia with the expectation of breastfeeding modestly (covering the chest with a blanket or something of the sort).

==== Nepal ====
There is a degree of stigma attached to public breastfeeding in Nepalese society and many women avoid doing so. The country has no laws about public breastfeeding. Nevertheless, it is not uncommon to see mothers breastfeeding their babies in public places such as buses, parks, restaurants, hospitals etc. in Nepal. In Nepalese society, breastfeeding a child is considered a must for the mothers. Mothers who do not or are unable to breastfeed their child are considered to be 'bokshi' – 'witch', and much social stigma is attached to it.

==== Philippines ====
In the Philippines, breastfeeding is protected by various laws, such as the Expanded Breastfeeding Promotion Act of 2009 and the Milk Code of the Philippines (Executive Order 51). Mothers are allowed to breastfeed in public. Employers are required to allow lactating employees breaks to breastfeed or express breastmilk. The law also states that the intervals should not be less than forty minutes for every eight hour working period. Offices, public establishments such as malls and schools, and government institutions are required to establish lactation stations separate from the bathroom, where mothers can breastfeed their babies or express milk. The Milk Code prohibits the advertising of infant formula or bottle teats for infants under two years old.

==== Saudi Arabia ====
Even though women cannot show any part of their body in public, breastfeeding is an exception. It is common for women to breastfeed in malls and parks, and it is acceptable among the people in Saudi Arabia.

==== Syria ====
In 2015, Islamic State's Al-Khansaa Brigade were reported to be punishing women who breastfed in public.

==== Taiwan ====
In Taiwan, Article 18 of the Gender Equality in Employment Act guarantees the right of employed women to breastfeed or collect milk during non-rest periods, while Article 23 stipulates that employers with more than 100 employees must provide a breastfeeding room and provide childcare facilities or measures.

Since November 2010, the Public Breastfeeding Act has safeguarded the right to breastfeed in public, while lactation rooms are set up to deal with privacy and to provide access to hot water and power supplies, with fines against interfering with a mother's right to breastfeed. After evicting a breastfeeding mother from the National Palace Museum on 18 July 2012 and enraging many Taiwanese website users, the offending employee and her employer were both fined 6000 new Taiwan dollars (about 200 United States dollars), said the Department of Health, Taipei City Government (Chinese: 臺北市政府衛生局), but the Museum would appeal.

=== Europe ===
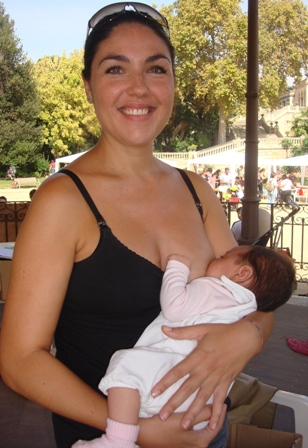
Woman nursing her infant at pro-breastfeeding conference in Spain

==== Czech Republic ====
Although public breastfeeding is often practiced and is not illegal, some people disapprove of it. Mothers who are breastfeeding in public buildings such as banks or coffee shops are sometimes asked to leave. These incidents can result in mothers making public protests.

==== France ====
Public breastfeeding is legal and widely accepted.

==== Germany ====
While public breastfeeding is widely accepted, especially since the Movement of 1968 when public "Nurse-Ins" (German: Still-Inns) were common, there is no legislation that specifically addresses breastfeeding in public.

Paragraph 2 Article 6 of the Basic Law for the Federal Republic of Germany provides that "the care and upbringing of children as the natural right of parents" while paragraph 4 "entitles every mother to the protection and care of the community".

==== Iceland ====
Public breastfeeding is widespread and uncontroversial.

==== Italy ====
In Italy, there is no law against public breastfeeding, but reactions to it vary in different communities. Some people regard it as embarrassing or taboo and this can lead mothers avoiding breastfeeding while in public places. In order to do this they express milk at home for later use, replace it with infant formula, or restrict and reduce their time away from home.

==== Ireland ====
In the Republic of Ireland, breastfeeding wherever necessary is protected by law under the Equal Status Act 2000, which protects people from discrimination and harassment (including sexual harassment). Although breastfeeding is not directly mentioned, protection for breastfeeding in public is covered by the Act on gender grounds. As a result, it is an offence to ask a breastfeeding woman to stop, move somewhere else or cover up, for example.

While this gives a legally protected right to breastfeed anywhere that it becomes necessary, Ireland has one of the lowest rates of breastfeeding in the world.

==== Netherlands ====
Public breastfeeding is common and widely socially accepted. There are no laws against public breastfeeding. Dutch law states that when an employee wishes to breastfeed her baby, the employer must provide, for the first nine months after the birth, a suitable nursing room and allow for 25% of work time to be spent on feeding the baby or pumping while on pay. After the first nine months, the employer is still required to assure conditions for breastfeeding are met (like timely breaks, nursing rooms, safe environment, etc.), but does not have to pay anymore for the time spent on breastfeeding or pumping.

==== Norway ====
Public breastfeeding in Norway is widespread, particularly in cafes. Mothers do not have to withdraw and hide to breastfeed their babies as the practice is widely accepted and uncontroversial in comparison to countries such as the United States and United Kingdom. However, in the past nursing mothers sometimes felt embarrassed to breastfeed in public. They were expected to follow social rules for public breastfeeding and could be criticised if they did not do so.

==== Poland ====
Public breastfeeding is widespread in Poland. There is a legal right to breastfeed in public, and it is illegal to prevent a nursing mother from doing so. This right is not restricted by Poland's law prohibiting indecency. Nevertheless, there are people in Poland who object to it and it is a controversial subject. Some nursing mothers are embarrassed by breastfeeding in public and make use of the amenities provided by certain businesses and institutions for this purpose. Others hide the activity under a scarf or breastfeeding cover. Polish law also provides breastfeeding employees with paid breaks for breastfeeding during working hours.

==== Spain ====
Spain's Equality Law provides a legal right to breastfeed in public. It is also widely accepted. In 2016, Member of Parliament Carolina Bescansa breastfed her son in the Congress of Deputies, receiving both praise and criticism for doing so.

==== United Kingdom ====
Breastfeeding in public (restaurants, cafes, libraries, etc.) in Great Britain is protected under the Equality Act 2010 which specifies that a business must not discriminate against a woman who is breastfeeding a child of any age in a public place. Her companion(s) are also protected by this act. In Northern Ireland sex discrimination law prevents women from being treated unfavourably because they are breastfeeding, and as of 2017, a specific law was planned to be introduced.

A 2004 UK Department of Health survey found that 84% (about five out of six people) find breastfeeding in public acceptable if done discreetly; however, 67% (two out of three) of mothers were worried about general opinion being against public breastfeeding. To combat these fears in Scotland, the Scottish Parliament passed legislation safeguarding the freedom of women to breastfeed in public in 2005. The legislation allows for fines of up to £2500 for preventing breastfeeding of a child up to the age of two years in public places.

==== Vatican City ====
In 2014, during a ceremony commemorating the baptism of Jesus, Pope Francis voiced his support for mothers breastfeeding their children in public spaces, including churches. On 9 January 2017, he reiterated his support for public breastfeeding during a baptism service, encouraging the mothers there to breastfeed their children during the service as needed, just as the Virgin Mary had breastfed Jesus.

=== North America ===
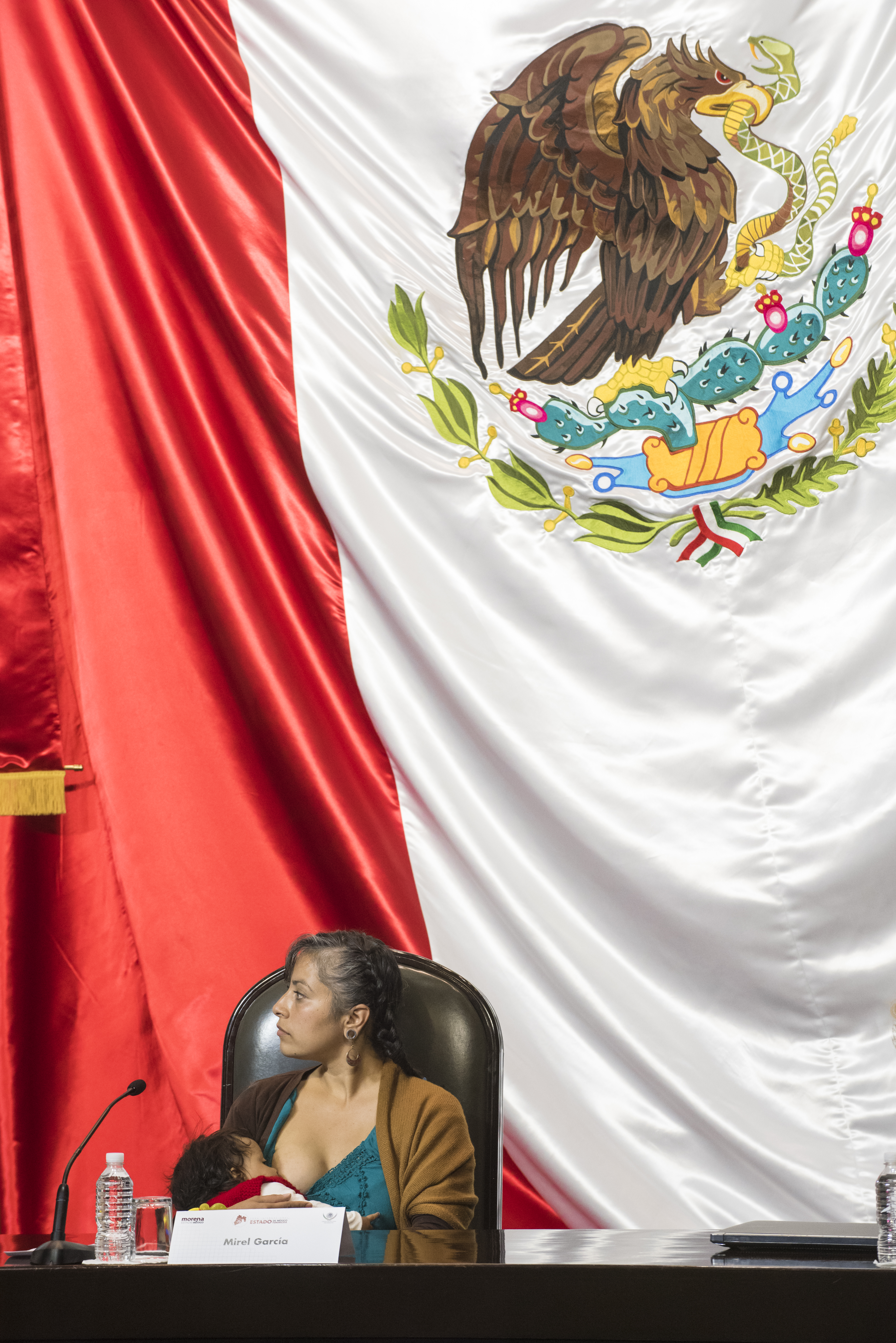
Mirel Yolotzin García Bazán breastfeeding her son at the Congress of the Union, Mexico City, 2016

==== Canada ====
In Canada, Section 28 of the Canadian Charter of Rights and Freedoms gives equal rights and freedoms to men and women, without explicitly mentioning breastfeeding. Both British Columbia and Ontario have included protections against discrimination due to breastfeeding in their provincial Human Rights Codes. In both provinces, discrimination due to breastfeeding is included in existing protections against discrimination based on sex. INFACT Canada (Infant Feeding Action Coalition) is a national non-governmental organization that aims to protect infant and young child health as well as maternal well-being through the promotion and support of breastfeeding and optimal infant feeding practices. It is an organization that provides support and education for Canadian mothers.

In 2009, a woman at a shop was asked by an employee to stop breastfeeding publicly, supported by a manager. She later received an apology and acknowledgement of customers' right to breastfeed. A worker at the YMCA in St. John's told a breastfeeding mother to leave the premises. The mother was feeding her seven-month-old daughter in a private change room, which required a monthly fee. YMCA CEO Jason Brown later apologized, stating "This situation has caused us to reflect and review, and certainly we see no reason why there should be a restriction to women breastfeed their babies in the adult-only change room."

==== United States ====
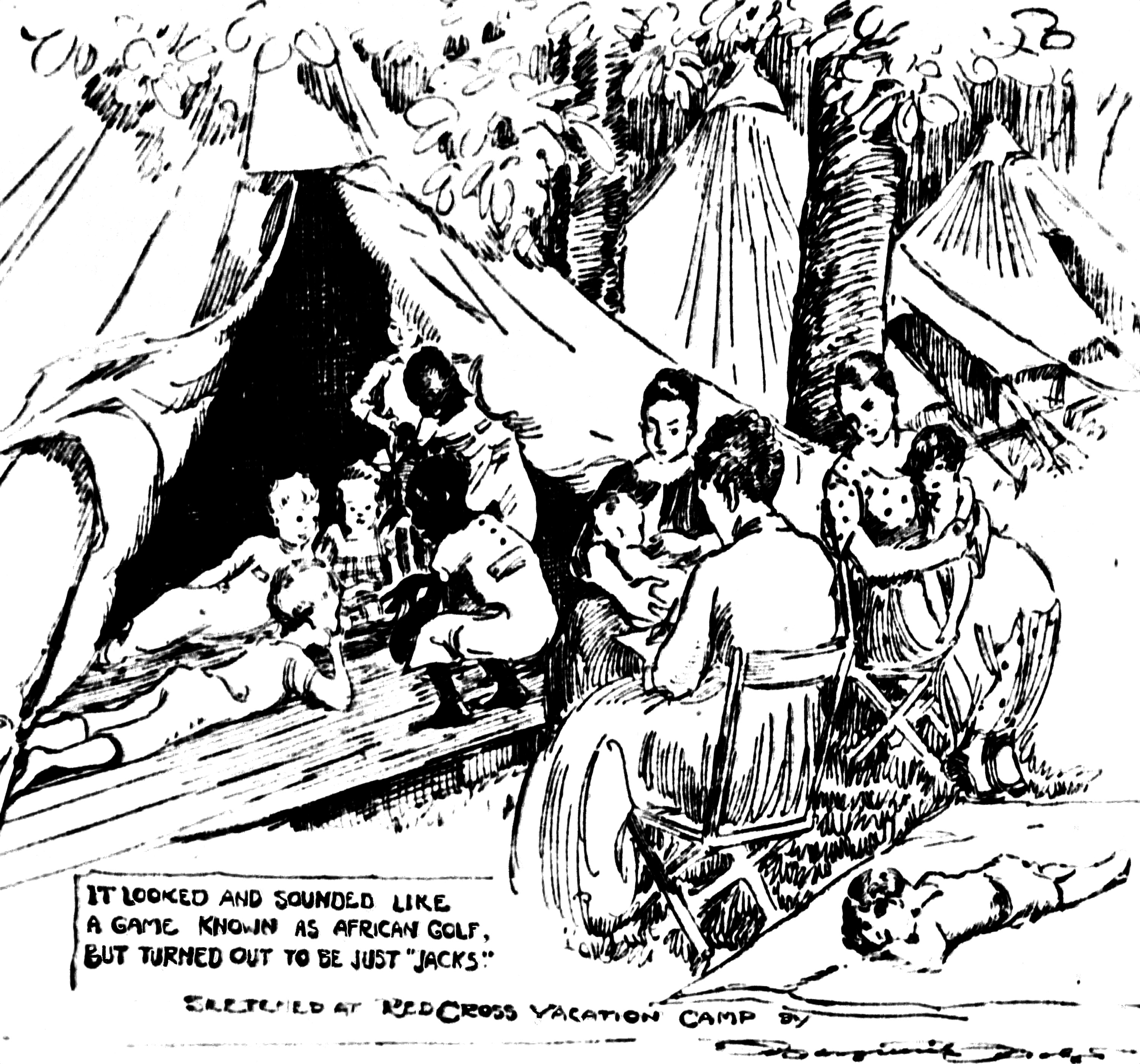
Woman in center is feeding her baby in a tent city erected in 1920 by the Red Cross in St. Louis, Missouri, so city families could get away from the August heat. (Drawing by Marguerite Martyn of the St. Louis Post-Dispatch.)

A number of issues constrain mothers from breastfeeding in public in the United States. In 2011, the US Surgeon General issued a plea to promote breastfeeding and stated in it: "Although focusing on the sexuality of female breasts is common on the mass media, visual images of breastfeeding are rare, and a mother may never have seen a woman breastfeeding". Another issue, especially in extended breastfeeding, is that US medical providers are not well-trained in supporting breastfeeding mothers. In a survey of medical professionals published in 2012, including physicians, midwives, residents, and nursing students, only 57.8% felt that breastfeeding over 1 year of age was normal. The recommendations for breastfeeding are until at least one year, yet in 2016 the Centers for Disease Control and Prevention (CDC) reported that only 51.8% of infants were breastfed at six months and 30.7% of infants were being breastfed at one year old.

In a 2004 survey conducted by the American Dietetic Association, 43% of the 3,719 respondents believed women ought to have the right to breastfeed in public. In spite of this, women breastfeeding in public have met with social resistance and even arrest. In some public places and workplaces, rooms for mothers to nurse in private have been designated.

U.S. legislation governing breastfeeding varies from state to state and a limited federal law only applies to federal government premises. A United States House of Representatives appropriations bill (HR 2490) contained an amendment specifically permitting breastfeeding and was signed into law on September 29, 1999. It stipulated that no government funds may be used to enforce any prohibition on women breastfeeding their children in federal buildings or on federal property. Further, a federal law also enacted in 1999 specifically provides that "a woman may breastfeed her child at any location in a federal building or on federal property, if the woman and her child are otherwise authorized to be present at the location."

Section 4207 of the Patient Protection and Affordable Care Act amended the Fair Labor Standards Act and required employers to provide a reasonable break time for an employee to breastfeed her child if it is less than one year old. The employee must be allowed to breastfeed in a private place, other than a bathroom. The employer is not required to pay the employee during the break time. Employers with fewer than 50 employees are not required to comply with the law if doing so would impose an undue hardship to the employer based on its size, finances, nature, or structure of its business.

A number of incidents of harassment of nursing mothers that gained media attention prompted a number of U.S. states to act. These actions included viral videos of people harassing breastfeeding mothers in public, protests, and social media campaigns. A particular incident with a Target employee harassing a breastfeeding mother helped to launch a new trend with corporations making breastfeeding accepted in their stores.

As of July 2018, all 50 states, the District of Columbia, and the Virgin Islands have passed legislation that explicitly allows women to breastfeed in public. Further, at least 29 states, the District of Columbia, and the Virgin Islands exempt them from prosecution for public indecency or indecent exposure for doing so.

On December 29, 2022, President Joe Biden signed the PUMP for Nursing Mothers Act, part of the Consolidated Appropriations Act of 2023. This act grants most nursing employees the right to reasonable break time and a private, non-bathroom space to express breast milk at work for up to one year after childbirth. The space must be shielded from view and free from intrusion, extending protections to more employees than previous legislation

=== Oceania ===
==== Australia ====
Section 7AA of the Sex Discrimination Act 1984 specifically prohibits discrimination against a woman on account of her breastfeeding. The prohibition also applies to a public or semi-public place. State and Territory laws differ, but it is generally illegal to discriminate against women breastfeeding in a public place as a protected attribute in five jurisdictions and by proxy from other existing legislation in the other jurisdictions.

The Australian Breastfeeding Association was founded in Melbourne, Victoria in 1964 as the Nursing Mothers' Association, and together with many health professionals, encourages and assists mothers to breastfeed their babies, if necessary also in a public place.

In February 2003, Kirstie Marshall, member of the Victorian Legislative Assembly, was ejected from Parliament for breastfeeding her 11-day-old baby on the basis that the baby was "a stranger" not entitled to be in the Chamber. As a result, a special room was set up for use by nursing mothers. A 2007 House of Representatives Committee on Health and Ageing report into breastfeeding recommended that Parliament House seek formal accreditation from the Australian Breastfeeding Association as a breastfeeding-friendly workplace. In March 2008, the Presiding Officers agreed to the recommendation and work commenced to provide facilities to assist breastfeeding mothers at Parliament House. Two small rooms were made available, one on each side of Parliament House, for members of parliament and other building occupants to breastfeed or express milk. Certificates of accreditation were provided in a ceremony at the parliament on 17 October 2008.

==== New Zealand ====
Breastfeeding is encouraged and public breastfeeding is common. In fact, bottle feeding has been so widely discouraged that public bottle feeding may make a mother feel more uncomfortable than public breastfeeding. Many shopping centers provide "parent's rooms" where mothers may change and feed their infants in comfort.

=== South America ===
In most areas of South America, breastfeeding is the norm and public breastfeeding is common in buses, parks, malls, etc. It is less common to see public bottle feeding than breastfeeding. While women are seldom seen nursing in upscale restaurants or on the streets of large cities, nursing is encouraged and thought of as normal and a nursing mother's breasts are not viewed as sexual objects.

==== Brazil ====
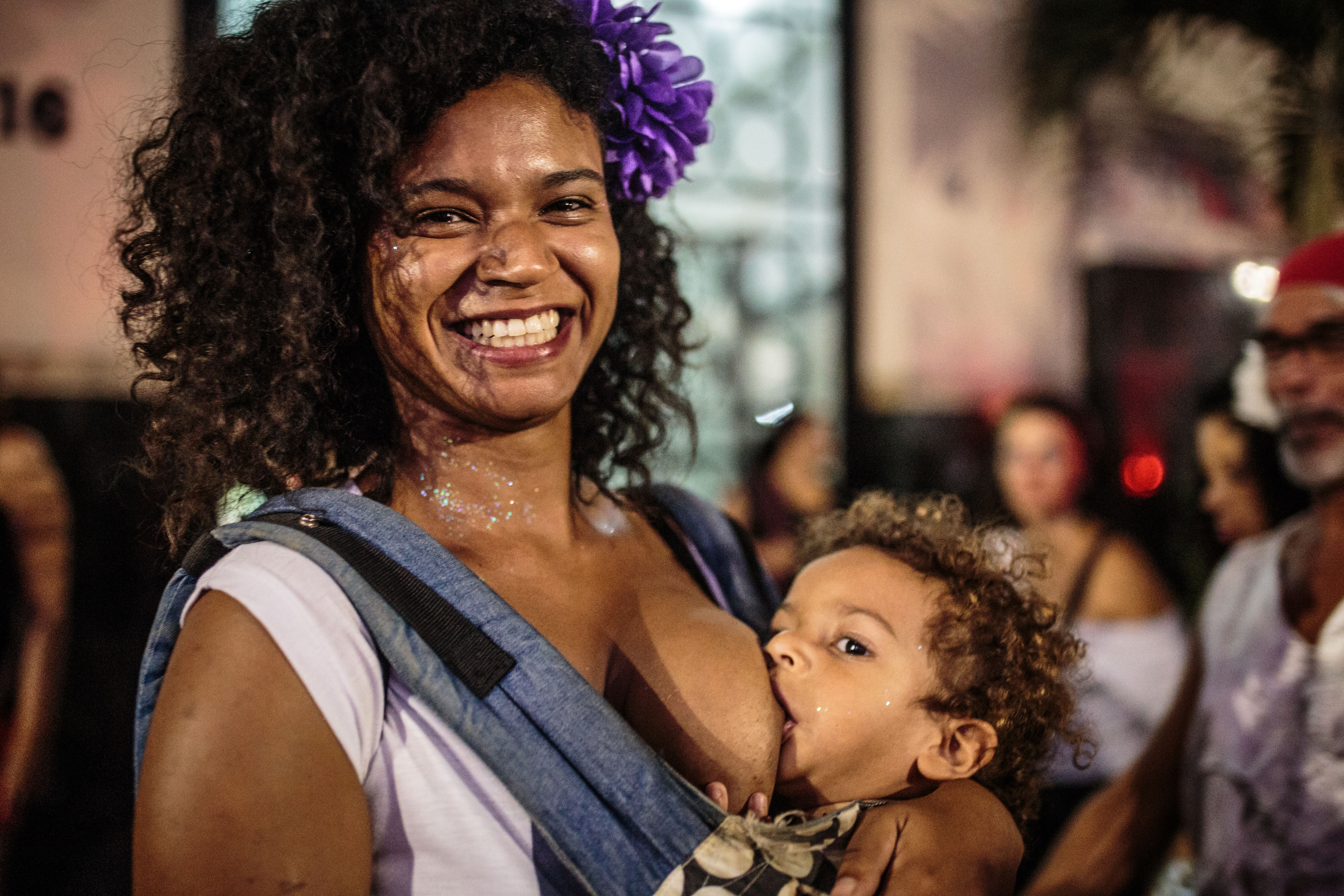
A woman breastfeeding at a carnival in Rio de Janeiro, Brazil, 2017

In Brazil, there are no laws that prevent or criminalize breastfeeding in public. Article 9 of the Child and Adolescent Statute states that the government, institutions and employers must provide adequate conditions for breastfeeding.

Some Brazilian states and municipalities have passed laws to ensure the right of mothers to breastfeed in public and private places. In 2015, the governor of the state of São Paulo, Geraldo Alckmin sanctioned a law passed by the Legislative Assembly that punishes anyone who prevents a woman from breastfeeding with a fine of approximately R$ 510.00. In case of recurrence, the amount of the fine is doubled. In the same year, a law similar to that of São Paulo was sanctioned by the mayor of the municipality of Rio de Janeiro, Eduardo Paes. The law provides for fines of R$2,000 to R$10,000 for companies and employees who prevent mothers from breastfeeding their children in any public or private place. In the state of Rio Grande do Sul, there is also a similar law prohibiting any type of constraint on breastfeeding in public. In state capital, Porto Alegre, fines are also foreseen for establishments that prohibit mothers from breastfeeding on their premises.

In 2019, a bill introduced by Senator Vanessa Grazziotin for ensure at the federal level the right to breastfeeding in public establishes fines of around R$1,996 for those who prevent mothers from breastfeeding in public. As of February 2022, the bill is still pending in the Constitution and Justice Committee of the Chamber of Deputies.

== Controversies ==
=== Breastfeeding at work in Canada ===
Under the Canadian Charter of Rights and Freedoms women are protected against discrimination, but Canada was one of the only countries that did not have paid breastfeeding breaks. Although over 26% of mothers breastfeed, many of them are forced to stop due to work restrictions.

=== Public breastfeeding in the U.S. ===
There have been incidents of owners of premises, or people present, objecting to or forbidding breastfeeding. In some cases, the mothers have left. In other cases, where a law guaranteeing the right to breastfeed has been broken, legal action has been taken. Some companies have even apologised afterward. One woman who was not allowed to breastfeed despite showing the Kentucky law that allows her the right, left but later organized several "nurse-in" protests in front of the restaurant and other public places.

In June 2007, Brooke Ryan was dining in a booth at the rear of an Applebee's restaurant when she began to breastfeed her seven-month-old son. Although she attempted to be discreet, another patron complained to the manager about indecent exposure. Both a waitress and the manager asked her to cover up. She handed him a copy of the Kentucky law that permitted public breastfeeding, but he would not relent. She opted to feed her son in her car, and later organized "nurse-out" protests in front of the restaurant and other public locations.

In 2008, a woman in New Orleans put a tent over her truck at a street festival so she could nurse her daughter privately. She was cited by police for an "unauthorized booth" and removed from the street festival.

=== Babytalk magazine cover ===
In 2006, the editors of U.S. Babytalk magazine received many complaints from readers after the cover of the August issue depicted a baby nursing at a bare breast. Even though the model's nipple was not shown, readers—many of them mothers—wrote that the image was "gross". In a follow-up poll, one-quarter of 4,000 readers who responded thought the cover was negative. Babytalk editor Susan Kane commented, "There's a huge puritanical streak in Americans."

=== Barbara Walters ===
In 2005, U.S. television presenter Barbara Walters remarked on her talk show The View that she felt uncomfortable sitting next to a breastfeeding mother during a flight. Her comments upset some viewers who began organizing protests over the internet. A group of about 200 mothers staged a public "nurse-in" where they breastfed their babies outside ABC's headquarters in New York.

=== Target store protest ===
In December 2011, Michelle Hickman was breastfeeding her infant at the back of a Target store in Houston, Texas. Although covered, she was asked by two employees to move to a fitting room. Hickman said one of the employees told her, "You can get a ticket and be reported for indecent exposure." She reported the harassment on Facebook, and in response a number of mothers organized public "nurse-ins" at Target stores across the United States in cities including Houston, Knoxville, and Decatur, Illinois.

=== Claridge's hotel ===
In 2014, a waiter at Claridge's hotel in Mayfair, London, asked Louise Burns to breastfeed under a cloth. Burns was told that it was hotel policy for mothers to cover up while breastfeeding. UK politician and broadcaster Nigel Farage spoke out in support of the hotel's right to have such a policy but the Prime Minister's office at 10 Downing Street said it was "totally unacceptable for any women to be made to feel uncomfortable when breastfeeding in public". A group of about 25 mothers held a protest against the policy by breastfeeding outside the hotel. Claridge's subsequently denied that asking breastfeeding mothers to cover up was hotel policy and said that breastfeeding mothers were welcome at the hotel, adding: "all we ask is that mothers are discreet towards other guests".

=== Breastfeeding in uniform in the US military ===
In May 2012, two Air Force National Guard service members stationed at Fairchild Air Force Base, Washington, participated in a breastfeeding awareness campaign hosted by the Mom2Mom of Fairchild Breastfeeding Support Group. Photographer Brynja Sigurdardottir, also a military spouse, staged and photographed Terran Echegoyen-McCabe and Christina Luna breastfeeding in uniform. Crystal Scott, the founder of Mom2Mom, said people thought the photograph was a disgrace to the uniform and compared their actions to defecating or urinating in uniform. Some military personnel felt that it was impossible for a woman to maintain a professional military bearing while nursing in uniform. But some active-duty veteran military members who are also mothers were more supportive, suggesting that the women enhanced the prestige of the military. The photographs quickly went viral and were shared worldwide. To help reduce the controversy, Sigurdardottir removed the photos from her website and Facebook fan page. Her intention was to raise awareness and support for women who breastfeed, inside and outside of the military. When the controversy arose, the message was quickly lost among critics.

While the U.S. Air Force did not endorse the pictures, their commanding officer gave the women permission to be photographed in uniform while breastfeeding. The U.S. military protects women in uniform by allowing them to defer deployments for 4 to 12 months after childbirth for breastfeeding purposes. Breastfeeding service members are provided regular breaks to breastfeed or pump while on duty, and are provided with a comfortable and private place to do so.

=== Facebook controversy ===
Facebook has been criticized for removing photos of mothers breastfeeding their children, citing offensive content in violation of the Facebook Terms of Service. Facebook claimed that these photos violated their decency code by showing an exposed breast, even when the baby covered the nipple. This action was described as hypocritical, since Facebook took several days to respond to calls to deactivate a paid advertisement for a dating service that used a photo of a topless model.

The breastfeeding photos controversy continued following public protests and the growth in the online membership in the Facebook group titled "Hey, Facebook, breastfeeding is not obscene! (Official petition to Facebook)". In December 2011 Facebook removed photos of mothers breastfeeding and, after public criticism, restored them. The company said it had removed the photos because they violated the pornographic rules in the company's terms and conditions. During February 2012, the company once again removed photos of mothers breastfeeding. Founders of a Facebook group "Respect the Breast" reported that "women say they are tired of people lashing out at what is natural and what they believe is healthy for their children."

== See also ==
- Breastfeeding and mental health
- Breastfeeding in art
- History and culture of breastfeeding
- International Breastfeeding Symbol
- Women's Equality Day
