= International breastfeeding symbol =

Symbol representing breastfeeding a baby

The international breastfeeding symbol

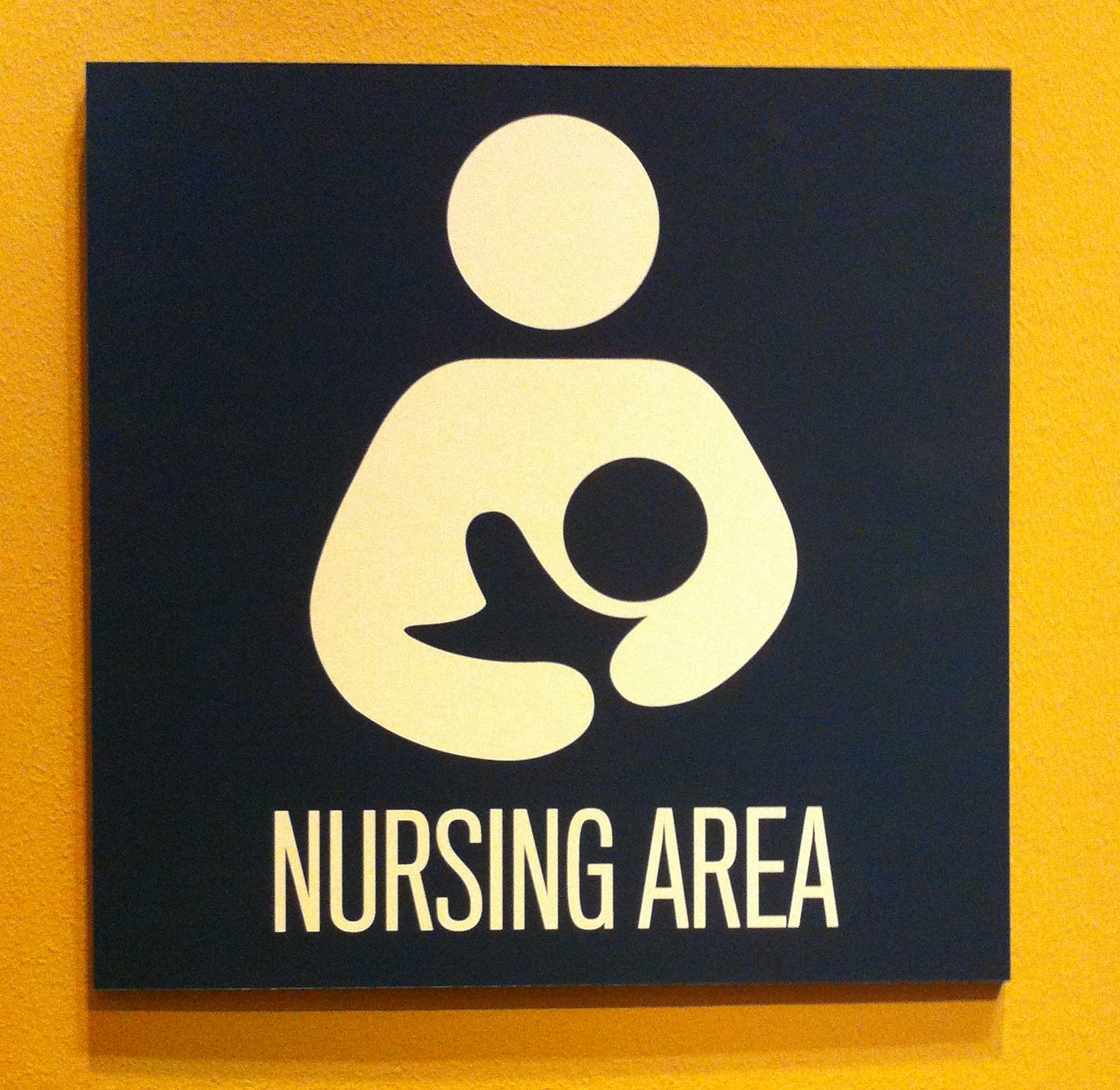
Sign for a private nursing area at a museum using the international breastfeeding symbol at a museum in Dallas, Texas

The international breastfeeding symbol is a symbol that depicts a woman breastfeeding a baby. It was designed by Matt Daigle, a graphic artist and father, in response to a contest hosted by Mothering magazine. The winner was chosen in November 2006 out of a total of more than 500 entries. Daigle, who says his wife and son were the inspiration behind the symbol, released the copyright to the symbol to the public domain.

Increasing cultural diversity and personal mobility have motivated a desire for universal modes of communication. The international breastfeeding symbol was created in the style of the AIGA symbol signs commonly seen in public places. Such symbols are intended to be understood at a glance by most people without written descriptions explaining what they mean.

The international breastfeeding symbol was created to address the perceived problem of not having a universally accepted and understood symbol for breastfeeding available for use in public places. The modern iconography representing infancy usually involves artificial feeding or soothing objects, like a nurser bottle icon or pacifier symbol. Nursing rooms have often used a baby bottle symbol to indicate what they are instead of a symbol of a mother nursing a child. It has been suggested that use of the symbol may be helpful in shifting the bottle-feeding cultural paradigm toward the biological norm of breastfeeding.

In July 2007, the International Breastfeeding Symbol site, a website dedicated to the new symbol, was launched.

Examples of uses of the symbol include:

- In 2008, the South Sound Breastfeeding Network of the state of Washington, United States, featured the symbol on a "Breastfeeding Welcome Here" campaign.
- In 2009, the symbol was agreed to be posted at a Chick-fil-A restaurant in Winter Park, Florida, United States, following a complaint by a restaurant customer that the manager of the restaurant had unlawfully asked her to cover her baby's head while breastfeeding.

== See also ==
- Breastfeeding in art
- List of international common standards
