= Childbirth in Japan =

This article deals with childbirth in Japan, and the specific details of childbirth exclusive to Japan in relation to beliefs, attitudes and healthcare.

== Background ==
=== History ===
Legend attributes the creation of Japan to a sun goddess from whom the original emperors are said to be descended beginning in 660 BC. Japan was, for the next one thousand years, a largely heterogeneous culture with diverse regional social patterns. Contact with Korea and China during this time brought aspects of both cultures to Japan, including rules of rank and etiquette, the Chinese calendar, astronomy, and a healing system based on traditional Chinese medicine. Military dictators, or shōguns, ruled for roughly the next seven hundred years, culminating in military reunification, and widespread implementation of civil order consistent with the ethos of the samurai class, e.g. rules of loyalty, social hierarchy, and filial piety.

Western attempts at trade with Japan were largely unsuccessful until 1853 when an American fleet led by Commodore Perry arrived in Japanese waters and forced Japan into unfavorable trading agreements. This event coincided with the fall of the shōguns and the subsequent Meiji restoration that ended a system of feudal landholders, and helped unify the nation. Japan quickly transitioned to a modern power with an imperial army. Japan then began to extend its empire and seize various Pacific islands and parts of Russia. This militarism carried over to the 1920s when Japan invaded China, to the 1930s when Japan joined the Axis powers, and finally into the 1940s when Japan attacked Pearl Harbor. In 1945, the historic drop of two atomic bombs by the US on Hiroshima and Nagasaki resulted in the disastrous outcomes that ultimately forced retreat.

The US then occupied Japan from 1945 to 1952 under General Douglas MacArthur. A new constitution took effect in 1947 according to which the emperor became largely a symbolic head of state. Japan regained its sovereignty in 1952, and in 1972 the US gave back some islands, the Ryukyu, that included Okinawa. Japan's economic growth was swift, relying on new technologies, manufacturing and a protectionist attitude. In 1998, Japan – like much of the region – suffered the worst recession since World War II, which led eventually to the resignation of the prime minister. Since then the economy has improved, but is still plagued by stagnation, a fact that the recent 23-foot tsunami and the largest earthquake in Japanese history that struck on March 11, 2011, did not help. A tsunami triggered by a huge earthquake in 2011 struck the nuclear power plant (NPP) in Fukushima and lead to the leakage of harmful radioactive materials, such as 131I, 137Cs, and 134Cs, into the environment. As a result, more than 170,000 people in Japan evacuated from the area at the time. The radioactive materials from Fukushima incident were released into the air and water, possibly polluting agriculture and marine life in Japan and other nearby countries.

=== Social structure and organization ===
The population of Japan in 2009 was 127.51 million. It is the tenth largest population in the world with the fifth highest population density. The country is increasingly urban. About 45% of the population was, in 2005, centered within 50 kilometers of the three largest cities in Japan: Tokyo, Osaka, and Nagoya.

In 2005, 20.1% of the population was over 65 years old. This figure is projected to increase to 31.8% by 2030, higher than any other industrialized nation. The fertility rate, at 1.21, is below the replacement level. The percent of three-generational households has steadily declined since the 1970s while the proportion of one-person and nuclear households has increased steadily in the same time period.

Social interactions in Japan are traditionally guided by the opposing dynamics of intimacy and hierarchy. In social situations, a commitment to group harmony, solidarity and intimacy must be balanced by deep respect for hierarchy. Rules of hierarchy are guided by age, social status and type of employment. Appropriate behavior therefore depends on a person's ability to assess the relative hierarchical distinction between individuals. Distance naturally decreases intimacy, and appropriate language must be used to communicate deference and avoid offending the other party. Traditionally, any behavior that fosters conflict or suggests deviance is not acceptable in Japan.

=== Political and economic system ===
Since its constitution was adopted in 1947, Japan has been a parliamentary government with a constitutional monarchy. The monarchy is hereditary while the prime minister must be elected by the Diet, or a bicameral legislative branch consisting of the House of Councilors and House of Representatives. Japanese local administration is by prefecture. The country is divided into 47 prefectures, each of which is further subdivided into cities with respective wards and blocks. Suffrage is granted at age 20

Japan boasts the fourth largest GDP in the world after the European Union, the United States, and China. While Japan was for centuries a largely agricultural economy, the percentage of the total labor force shifted dramatically in the twentieth century from agriculture to industrial occupations. Consequently, Japan must import about 60% of its food. Japan is one of the world's largest, most technologically sophisticated producers of automobiles, electronic equipment (including digital cameras), machine tools, steel and nonferrous metals, ships, chemicals, textiles, and processed foods. The unemployment rate is stable at less than 5%. Nevertheless, the economy is challenged by Japan's huge government department, exceeding 200% of the GDP, unrelenting deflation, reliance on exports, and graying, diminishing population.

A classic "M-shaped curve" notably marks female employment as many women drop out of the labor force to raise children. Three times as many women are employed part-time as men.

The Japan Council for Quality Health Care administers the Japan Obstetric Compensation System for Cerebral Palsy, a no-fault compensation system for the care of delivery-related cerebral palsy.

=== Religion ===
Religion, as practiced in Japan today, includes Shinto (83.9%), Buddhism (71.4%), Christianity (2%), and other (7.8%). Total adherence exceeds 100% because many identify with both Shinto and Buddhism. Shinto shrines, honoring gods and goddesses of ancient Japanese mythology, decorate the landscape of Japan. Shinto is based on earlier animistic and shamanistic traditions, and contains many concepts crucial to daily Japanese life today including cleanliness of the body and home. Shinto was for a long time considered the "people's religion" while Buddhism was adopted originally by the elite. Fundamental to Zen Buddhism are values such as personal effort, personal sacrifice, dedication, exertion, attunement to the body as well as meditation centered upon daily activities such as tea drinking, flower arrangement, and gardening. Confucian philosophical traditions, while not specifically religious, are also embedded within Japanese culture. The five essential relationships according to this philosophy are father-son, ruler-son, husband-wife, older brother-younger brother, and between friends. Clearly this system leaves out woman-centered relationships (e.g. mother-daughter).

=== Physical environment ===
Japan is a country of islands with Korea to the west, China to the southwest, and Russia to the north. Most of the population lives on the four main islands located between the Pacific Ocean and the Sea of Japan. These islands are called Hokkaido, Honshu, Shikoku, and Kyushu. The entire land mass of Japan is slightly smaller than California, but the climate varies dramatically from cool and temperate in the north to tropical in the south. This mostly mountainous country is, based on its location, vulnerable to a variety of natural hazards including volcanoes, earthquakes, tsunamis, and typhoons.

=== Health and illness theories ===
Japan's primary medical system is biomedicine. In the late 1800s, the Japanese government formally adopted the German system of medical training and medical care delivery. This system of health care exists side by side with a uniquely Japanese system of healing called Kampo The government granted Kampo official status in the 1950s, a landmark event which came with both government regulation as well as national insurance coverage for certain types of treatment. Kampo is centered on establishing balance of physical, mental, social, and emotional states. An imbalance may be due to changes such as heat (e.g. overactivity), poor diet, dampness, or pathogens. Balance and imbalance are understood according to three main sets of contrasting states: hot/cold, excess/deficiency, and internal/external. A practitioner of Kampo gathers extensive personal information about physical and emotional experience and focuses on restoring balance. Treatments include moxibustion and acupuncture. Kampo treatment is generally considered appropriate for chronic conditions, when multiple organs are affected (e.g. immune disorders or age-related decline), or when biomedicine cannot diagnose or effectively treat a condition.

=== Women's health statistics ===
While the social status of women is relatively low, the status of mother is very high in Japan. The concept of ryosai kenbo (good wife and wise mother), while contributing to the positive perception of and respect for the mothering role, has been the focus of some resistance by women in the past 25 years. The mean childbearing age is 29.7, an approximately four-year increase since 1979. Mean age of first marriage is 28.6 for women, representing an over five-year increase since 1950. Marriage rates have decreased since 1970; divorce rates, while remaining low, have slightly increased since 1970. Nevertheless, most women in Japan still have one or two children and devote enormous amounts of time and energy into raising them. Citizenship is notably guarded: a child born in Japan does not receive Japanese nationality if both parents are non-Japanese, or if a Japanese father denies paternity of a child born to a non-Japanese woman.

The availability of the birth control pill in Japan is a highly contentious issue due to the government's concern for its many potentially negative systemic side effects and worry that it may contribute, through lack of condom use, to a rise of HIV. While the pill is now available, usage continues to be lower than many other countries. A 2001 survey of 1500 women, for example, found that only 4% of Japanese women use this method compared to 87% in the US and 93% in Germany.

Abortion has been legal in Japan since 1948. A 1982 survey by the Kyodo News Service reported than 75% of women in their fifties had undergone abortions at some point in their lives. Abortion became legal during the postwar period when the needs of survival limited the number of mouths a family could feed. Nevertheless, abortion is not taken lightly and is traditionally marked by various Buddhist rituals in which parents express regret and gratitude to their aborted children for their sacrifice for the family. A 2005 study by Osaka University Graduate School of Medicine reported that there were 341,588 induced abortions in 2001. In addition, the abortion rate has been gradually increased by 5.4% to 292 per 1,000 live births from 1998 to 2001.

Women's health related figures in Japan are inspiringly positive. Japan boasts one of the longest life expectancies for women in the world at 82.25 years. According to WHO statistics, life expectancy rate were 83 for both sexes and 86 for women in 2011. And the infant mortality rate is 2.78 deaths per 1,000 live births, one of the lowest in the world. Whether these two facts are related to a final figure, the 2011 estimate of fertility rate of just 1.21 children, is as yet undetermined. Infant mortality rate has decreased to 2.13 per 1,000 live births in 2014. Maternal mortality rate is 5 deaths per 100,000 live births, one of the lowest in the world

== Pregnancy behaviors and beliefs ==
=== Prenatal care ===
The vast majority (or, approximately 99%) of women who carry pregnancies to term in Japan are married. The majority of these women stop working once they become pregnant. Japanese women are required by the Maternal Child Health Act to register their pregnancies with the local government, and encouraged to be vigilant of their pregnancy by utilizing the Maternal and Child Health Handbook (boshi techo) distributed upon registration. Over 90% of pregnancies are registered before the 20th week of gestation, suggesting that most women are visiting a doctor and receiving support from public health services.

Japanese women are advised to have prenatal visits every 4 weeks through 23 weeks gestation, every 2 weeks from 24 to 35 weeks, and every week after 36 weeks, for a total of 14 prenatal visit for a low to medium risk pregnancy. Ultrasound is used routinely to monitor the development of the fetus; most women have at least five fetal ultrasound exams during their pregnancy, a heavy use of technology considered necessary to assure a healthy baby and safe birth. Pregnant women in Japan have a strong belief related to ultrasonography. As a result, most pregnant women in Japan often receive fetal sonogram in every prenatal visit. They believe that monitoring normal development of the fetus will facilitate safe delivery. Additionally, because Japanese women prioritize safe delivery, episiotomy is often performed in all birth cases. Screenings for domestic violence and maternal depression are not often conducted during prenatal visits in Japan, while in the US 35% of women are screened for domestic violence and 47% for maternal depression.

Genetic screening tests, such as amniocentesis, are available in Japan but rarely used. Contrary to US culture, the idea of having a "normal" or "abnormal" fetus is not as much a part of the traditional Japanese conception of pregnancy. Rather, the Japanese paradigm sees a fetus as inherently a work in progress, or "perfectible." Ob-gyns rarely initiate open discussion of the possibility of undergoing amniocentesis or triple marker tests with pregnant patients. In fact, the Health Ministry issued guidelines in 1999 according to which ob-gyns have no obligation to inform patients of these tests. Having an abortion due to fetal abnormalities is very rare. Some theorize that the reason for this is because the role of mother is so highly valued, while others suggest that women, freed from the pressure of holding down a job during motherhood, are less daunted by the time required to care for a child with additional needs.

=== Local conceptualization of pregnancy ===
Pregnancy is considered a period of mental and physical discipline for women, a process during which women literally make their babies. The outcome of a pregnancy is deeply tied to a woman's conduct; women are considered responsible for minimizing miscarriage and premature birth. There are many theories as to why this may be. Primary to understanding this idea is the Japanese principle of ganbaru, a fundamental notion that can be traced to many aspects of Japanese lifestyle. It means a general ability to "try as hard as possible at whatever one does." For example, women are often reprimanded by their doctors to try harder if they are gaining what is considered too much weight (e.g. no more than 22 pounds is recommended, while some doctors advise less). If a pregnant Japanese woman is gaining too much weight, she may be instructed to weigh herself daily until she meets the goals set by her ob-gyn.

Men are considered to be far removed from pregnancy because it isn't occurring in their bodies; they are therefore often exempt from maternity courses, medical visits, as well as sometimes the birth event itself.

=== Preparation for birth ===
During the fifth month of pregnancy (which is the American fourth month because, in Japan, months are counted as having four weeks while in the USA some months are 4 and some 5) women often go with a mother or grandmother to a shrine that is dedicated to safe childbirth. Here the women pray for a safe childbirth and purchase a special pregnancy sash, or obi to wrap around the abdomen of the pregnant woman. This sash is meant to protect the uterus from the cold, keep the fetus stable and prevent it from growing too large. The ritual also aids in creating maternal identity.

=== Extrinsic factors ===
==== Food ====
Environment, or kankyo, is also a key concept in the Japanese theory of gestation. This idea surpasses the Western concept of what you feed yourself you feed your baby by encompassing ideas about certain foods being related to coldness or heat. Sweets, for example, are considered a cold food that should be avoided in pregnancy as the womb is meant to be warm. Also promoted is the idea that a pregnant woman should eat foods native to Japan. The concept moto ni modoru in this context suggests that in regard to food, one should go back to the origin when pregnant. In other words, Japanese babies are made of Japanese food which comes from Japanese soil. Traditional thoughts about proper food to eat in pregnancy relate to the idea that women are not just vessels, but active vehicles working toward creation.

==== Emotional behavior ====
Emphasis is also made in prenatal care on keeping a tranquil heart, limiting stress, and trying to elevate your spirits, becoming spiritual (even if you're usually not), and stroking the baby from time to time. This concept of mental wellbeing is called shinkyo and many doctors will be more lax on nutrition if they feel the food pressure is stressing out a woman and putting her spirit in danger.

==== Sexual activity ====
Topics not typically covered with the physician during prenatal visits for which Japanese women may turn to popular magazines include: sex during pregnancy, information regarding the birth experiences other women, unusual methods for delivery, as well as explanations of many medical terms.

==== Rest, activity, and movement or personal behavior ====
Stress and physical difficulty are considered harmful to the healthy development of pregnancy. Work is considered one of the many environmental factors women are supposed to control. The Maternal and Child Health handbook details for women acceptable "postures for physical activity in daily life." They are also instructed in this book to keep their bodies warm at all times, stabilize their bellies, and protect themselves against bumps.

== Labor ==
=== Location ===
Satogaeri shussan, or going back home, is a traditional custom in Japan according to which pregnant women return to their natal homes for labor and childbirth. This tradition, though waning in contemporary Japan, reinforces family ties and also reflects the practical needs of the mother to be. Often a woman will switch doctors at this time. It is more common today for a mother to stay at home and have her mothers, sister, or mother-in-law come to look after her, especially in the case of a second pregnancy, than to go to her parents' house. Additionally, the most recent change introduced new medical procedures, change in birth attendants, and change in birthplace.

=== Extrinsic factors ===
==== Food and drink ====
Eating and drinking during labor are usually encouraged by medical providers in Japan. Japanese women tend to eat voraciously in labor, which counters common practice in American hospitals. Eating is encouraged, especially by midwives, so that the laboring woman will have energy to push.

==== Movement, activity, and emotional behavior ====
Walking is encouraged during labor by most medical providers in Japan. But making loud sounds is not considered acceptable during labor.

=== Pain ===
In Japan, primary and secondary level maternity hospitals and clinics do not use epidurals. Most Japanese women alleviate pain in others ways such as breathing, movement, and massage/acupressure.

Many Japanese women believe that the mother child bond is strengthened through labor. Others fear that pain medication will make the fetus weak and unhealthy. Some Japanese women who do not use pain medication for the first labor decide to use it in subsequent births.

=== Attendants during labor and supportive behavior ===
Female relatives traditionally help Japanese woman through labor. While men traditionally do not help in labor, one recent 2011 cohort study revealed that about half of Japanese women now have their husbands in the laboring room. Massage, stroking, and acupressure by female relatives are commonly utilized techniques to help a woman in Japan through labor.

== Birth ==
=== Birth attendant and assistants ===
Births in Japan are attended by either licensed doctors or experienced midwives. Childbirth in Japan underwent three significant changes. During the Edo era, from 17th to 19th centuries, birth attendant had been an officially recognized as a profession in Japan. In the beginning of the 19th century however, traditional birth attendants were replaced by modern birth attendants also known as "kindai-sanba". While statistics suggest that only 2.8% of births in Japan are attended by midwives, it is estimated that closer to half of all births in Japan are midwife-attended. The discrepancy is likely because of a legal provision that doctors must sign his or her name when both a doctor and midwife are present at birth. In actuality, it is a frequent occurrence in hospitals that a midwife attends an entire labor and birth, and a doctor is only called in at the final pushing stage.

Professional midwives had a national midwifery association in Japan from 1927 until it was dissolved by U.S. occupying forces after WWII. Since 1948, the education system for midwives was combined with nursing education, both of which require three years of training. The word for midwife also changed after 1947. The original word sanba (san meaning birth and ba meaning old women) was changed to josan-pu (josan meaning help delivery, and pu meaning woman). And in 2002 it was changed again to josan-shi (josan meaning help and shi meaning teacher) to avoid gender connotations. Traditionally, midwives in Japan continuously share strong relationships with the families of the baby they delivered. Because Japanese people believe that babies are transferred to humans by god and that midwives are people who facilitate the process, midwives often stay as godmothers of babies that they help deliver. Moreover, midwives often continue to live in the community near their godchild babies for this religious reason.

In 2006 there were 25,775 midwives in Japan: 88% worked in hospitals and clinics, 6% were independent, and 6% were employed by universities, and government institutions. Independent midwives attend birth in one of the 388 practicing maternity homes nationwide. In 2012, the number of midwives in Japan were 35,185: 62% worked at hospitals, 25% at clinics, and 13% at health centers, maternity homes, universities and others.

Medical education in Japan lasts six years, and begins directly after high school. The first four years of training are considered preclinical, and the final two years are clinical. In 2006, there were 79 medical schools in Japan, and the students were 32.8% female. A recent law now requires training for an additional two years after graduation. The field of obstetrics in Japan differs from the US in the high value placed on normal physiologic birth, and in the concept of obstetrics as a field largely distinct from surgery.

=== Locus of decision making power ===
Doctors are often addressed as sensei in Japanese, significant because people with the title of sensei are typically not questioned. Other positions that share this title, e.g. teacher, professor, and priest are – as keepers of knowledge – traditionally obeyed. (Engel 1989) Patients who ask too many questions risk seeming offensive or irritating, and a good patient is a passive one. Consequently, mode of delivery is thought to be best decided by obstetricians, not by laboring women (Matsuoka & Hinokuma 2009) For example, requesting a cesarean without medical reason is perceived as unacceptable.

The care provided by independent midwives at maternity homes or in home births is traditionally woman centered, the locus of decision-making power remains with the laboring woman.

=== Location of birth ===
In 2005, 51.5% of Japanese babies were born in hospitals, 47% in private physician-run clinics with fewer than nineteen beds, 1.0% in maternity homes, and 0.2% at home.

=== Birth position ===
Japanese women predominantly give birth in a semi-sitting position, though some literature suggest the lying down, lithotomy position, is still used.

=== Pain ===
Painkillers are thought to complicate deliveries and women are discouraged by ob-gyns from taking them during childbirth. Therefore, Japanese births tend to be without pain medication. Furthermore, there is a more positive image of a woman capable of natural birth. Without pain medication, labor displays the woman's strength and responsibility. Some believe that not experiencing pain during birth hinders bonding between mother and baby.

If a Japanese woman would like an epidural during labor, she must give birth at one of the few private and expensive hospitals that provide them. Pursuing this option is still relatively rare in Japan today.

Many midwives practice perineal massage to promote stretching, ease birth, and minimize maternal trauma.

=== Extrinsic factors ===
==== Activity and movement ====
In facing birth without pain medications, many supportive techniques are used such as breathing, position changes, movement, massage, stroking, and acupressure.

==== Emotional behavior ====
Japanese women are expected to experience labor and birth quietly, with an emphasis on breathing techniques. Screaming or shouting by a laboring or birthing women may be met with a request such as, "no voicing" from an attendant, and a refocus on breathing and remaining calm.

=== Behavior for complications ===
Obstetricians, especially the older generation still practicing, advocate for physiological births and discourage unnecessary interventions.

If complications arise that demand cesareans, then cesareans are performed. However, cesarean birth has a negative image in Japan, and is often perceived as suggestive that a woman was incompetent or deficient. The rate of c-sections in Japan in 2005 was, according to one estimate, 17.4%. Other reports suggest the rate is as low as 10% in some locations; nevertheless, rates between 10% and 20% reported throughout Japan are significantly lower than North America. Of women attempting vaginal birth at a maternity home, about 10.2% are eventually transferred for complications to large hospitals with neonatal intensive care units.

=== Use of technology and other interventions ===
Use of a continuous fetal monitor is the norm in hospitals and physician-run clinics, but precisely when this is typically applied is hard to discern from existing literature. Episiotomies were in 1995 still common in Japan: in the hospital the rate for primiparas was 88% and 41% for multiparas. (Matsuoka & Hinokuma 2009) Maternity homes tend to use far less technology and interventions. For example, the rate of episiotomies in maternity homes for primiparas was 5% and for multiparas it was 1%.

== Postpartum ==
=== Time and place ===
Most women stay in the hospital for 4 to 7 days after vaginal delivery, and about 10 days after cesarean. This period is a time for ansei, or peace and quiet with pampering. Rest is considered very important; it is thought that the long recuperation after childbirth helps explain why Japanese women have less uterine disease and need fewer hysterectomies in middle age than American women. Some Japanese hospitals do not provide rooming in as it interferes with rest, while others do. Traditionally, Japanese women were expected to stay inside with their babies for the first 100 days after birth, but this is not expected in contemporary Japan.

=== Different behaviors for primiparous vs. multiparous women ===
While all Japanese women are encouraged to rest after birth, primiparous women need only focus on one child whereas multiparous women face additional childcare obligations. Therefore, while primiparous Japanese women traditionally return to their mother's home for about one month after leaving the hospital to be cared for and receive help with the care of the baby, it is more likely that female family members of a new mother will go to her house to help out if there are additional children to watch.

=== Postpartum depression ===
One study of Japanese women done in 2005 found that the prevalence of maternity blues and postpartum depression was much less for women who gave birth in maternity homes than for those who delivered in hospitals. The authors attributed this difference to the idea that bodily damage and pain are experienced far less in Japanese maternity homes than hospitals. A study by Ikeda and Kamibeppu found that 20.4% of Japanese women have postpartum depression.

=== Risk factors of postpartum depression ===
A study from 2008 found that Japanese pregnant women who scored high on the Edinburgh Postnatal Depression Scale (EPDS) and the State-Trait Anxiety Inventory State (STAIS) were correlated to having worries about childcare as well as childbirth itself, including difficulties in labor, and a premature delivery. Multiparous women have higher scores on the EPDS and STAIS compared to first time mothers. However, primiparous women who experience life events such as moving, and worry about childcare who score high on the State-Trait Anxiety Inventory Trait (STAIT) are also at correlated higher risk of postpartum depression.

Various other risk factors for postpartum depression include family history of mental illness, a strained marriage and general stressful life events, as well as anxiety and depression before pregnancy. Due to cultural factors, Japanese women refrain from using medication while pregnant, including antidepressants they may have previously been prescribed which may lead to an increase of maternal depression. While antidepressants are also the most common form of treatment for postpartum depression, Japanese women usually prefer other means such as psychotherapy. One study from 2018 shows that Japanese women overestimate the fetal risks associated with medication taken while pregnant, impacting their own overall health.

Postpartum depression is lower in Japan compared to Europe and North America, but increasing westernization can likely increase the level in Japan. Preventative measures such as better postpartum facilities, screening methods and overall greater assistance systems for pregnant women are recommended by the author to combat postpartum depression. When a pregnant woman has both high STAIT and EPDS scores, among other factors that predispose them to postpartum depression, further supports can be given increasing preventative measures, as well as increasing effectiveness by being able to accommodate the stressors different women face. For example, first time mothers might benefit more from learning about general labor and educational programs compared to a mother with multiple children worrying about increasing housework and childcare.

=== Importance in recognizing risk factors of postpartum depression ===
Recognizing the types of risk factors is important as approximately 100 women in Japan each year commit suicide from the burden of childcare and rearing. A study analyzing abnormal deaths of Japanese perinatal women found that in Tokyo between 2005 and 2014, 63 suicides were correlated to obstetric abnormalities as well as suffering from a mental illness such as postpartum depression that lead to this figure being double the average maternal morality rate. Postpartum depression may also contribute towards child abuse and therefore more substantial measures against both postpartum and perinatal depression is needed for the safety of the mother and child.

== Newborn ==
=== Vaccinations ===
Like most newborns in Western hospitals, infants are given a series of vaccines and screening procedures, and can be seen as rites of passage. In contemporary Japan, the baby is given a hepatitis B vaccine, and is screened for a variety of diseases, including phenylketonuria, and hypothyroid disease. This process is voluntary but there is about 99% compliance. Besides frequent health and developmental checks in clinics during the first year, special development checks are required by law for all children at 18 months of age, and again at age 3.

=== Caregiver ===
The mother is the primary caregiver in Japan. While fathers occasionally help with the baby, their main responsibility is to support their family. It is a traditional Japanese belief that contact and interaction between mother and newborn, or "skinship", during the first three years is one of the most important periods of the child's life. It builds the relationship between mother and child. Also, because childcare options are limited, working women often rely on their parents for assistance. In fact, 67.2% of working women with children under 1 turn to grandparents for childcare. While attitudes are changing, a survey in the early 1990s showed that 55.6% of women and 65.7% of men agreed that child care and other housework fall entirely in the woman's domain.

=== Umbilical cord ===
Japanese hospitals typically place part of the umbilical cord that falls off in a traditional box specifically designed for this purpose. When the mother leaves the hospital, the umbilical cord is given to her. This Japanese custom is based upon the belief that the umbilical cord has a direct relationship to the health of the baby. Maltreating it, therefore, risks causing harm or disease in the child. In some Japanese households, a mother may show a child the umbilical cord on certain events like birthdays to recall the day the child was born. In other households, the umbilical cord is given to a child on the day he or she leaves home or marries symbolize separation. Also, a preserved umbilical cord is considered to be a cure for the child when he or she is sick. Parents would cut a small portion of the cord and feed it to the child. Additionally, the Japanese believe that the umbilical cord is a symbol of the child's fate. So if one loses his or her umbilical cord, his/her spiritual fate is considered lost as well.

=== Extrinsic factors ===
==== Bathing ====
Bathing the baby is the traditional role of the father, providing a means of "skinship".

==== Food and drink ====
Japanese women strongly believe in natural childbirth (Yeo et al. 2000). This includes eating natural and organic home-cooked meals. As a result, many pregnant women do not take prenatal vitamins or supplements.

In the hospital, Japanese midwives perform daily breast massage to encourage milk production and flow. Women are encouraged to breastfeed their child on a set schedule. According to a 2006 study, 90% of women in Japan were breastfeeding exclusively at one week after birth compared to 51% of U.S. women. Breastfeeding is officially promoted, but artificial milk is also heavily advertised. (Engel 1989) Many women in Japan breastfeed, but when the baby is in a grandmother's care, for example, formula may be given.

An example of an okuizome ceremony, 2019

When a baby is 100 days old, Japanese families celebrate a weaning ceremony called okuizome, (お食い初め) or first food. This ceremony traditionally involves a large shared meal prepared by the mother-in-law. The menu varies by region. During the meal a symbolic stone is placed on plates. This ritual is meant to wish the baby a life of abundant food without hunger as well as good strong teeth. While people may pretend to feed the baby solid food during these festivities, the baby is usually still drinking exclusive milk.

==== Sleep ====
In Japan, co-sleeping with newborns is very normal. Japanese babies traditionally sleep in the same room or near parents.

==== Naming ====
When a baby turns 7 days old, Japanese families celebrate Oshichiya (お七夜). In this ceremony, the baby is officially named. The mother, the father, and the grandparents are often involved in this process.
