= Antenatal depression =

- Specialty: OB/GYN psychiatry

Antenatal depression, also known as prenatal or perinatal depression, is a form of clinical depression that can affect a woman during pregnancy, and can be a precursor to postpartum depression if not properly treated. It is estimated that 7% to 20% of pregnant women are affected by this condition. Any form of prenatal stress felt by the mother can have negative effects on various aspects of fetal development, which can cause harm to the mother and child. Even after birth, a child born from a depressed or stressed mother feels the effects. The child is less active and can also experience emotional distress. Antenatal depression can be caused by the stress and worry that pregnancy can bring, but at a more severe level. Other triggers include unplanned pregnancy, difficulty becoming pregnant, history of abuse, and economic or family situations.

Commonly, symptoms involve how the patient views herself, how she feels about going through such a life changing event, the restrictions on the mother's lifestyle that motherhood will place, or how the partner or family feel about the baby. Pregnancy places significant strain on a woman's body, so stress, mood swings, sadness, irritability, pain, and memory changes are to be expected. Left untreated, antenatal depression can be extremely dangerous for the health of the mother and the baby. It is highly recommended that mothers who feel they are experiencing antenatal depression have a discussion about it with their health care provider. Mothers with a history of mental health issues should also talk to their doctor about it early in the pregnancy to help with possible depressive symptoms.

== Signs and symptoms ==
Antenatal depression is classified based on a woman's symptoms. During pregnancy, a lot of changes to mood, memory, eating habits, and sleep are common. When these common traits become severe, and begin to alter one's day-to-day life, that is when it is considered to be antenatal depression. Symptoms of antenatal depression are:

- Inability to concentrate
- Overwhelming anxiety and fear
- Difficulty remembering
- Feeling emotionally numb
- Extreme irritability
- Sleeping too much or not enough, or restless sleep
- Extreme or unending fatigue
- Desire to over eat, or not eat at all
- Weight loss/gain unrelated to pregnancy
- Loss of interest in sex
- A sense of dread about everything, including the pregnancy
- Feelings of failure, or guilt
- Persistent sadness
- Thoughts of suicide or death

Other symptoms can include the inability to get excited about the pregnancy, and/or baby, a feeling of disconnection with the baby, and an inability to form/feel a bond with the developing baby. This can drastically affect the relationship between the mother and the baby, and can drastically affect the mother's capacity for self-care. Such inadequacies can lead to even greater risk factors for the mother. Antenatal depression can be triggered by various causes, including relationship problems, family or personal history of depression, infertility, previous pregnancy loss, complications in pregnancy, and a history of abuse or trauma.

=== Onset and duration of symptoms ===
Antenatal depression can be caused by many factors. Often it is associated with the fear and stress of the pregnancy. Other factors include unintended pregnancy, hyperemesis gravidarum, financial issues, living arrangements and relationships with the father and family. Typically, depression symptoms associated with pregnancy are categorized as postnatal depression, due to the onset of symptoms occurring after childbirth has occurred. The following is a breakdown of when a group of various women began to feel the onset of symptoms associated with depression:

- 11.8 percent at 18 weeks
- 13.5 percent at 32 weeks
- 9.1 percent 8 weeks after the birth
- 8.1 percent 8 months after the birth

In a recent article posted by The BabyCenter, the authors stated that "For years, experts mistakenly believed that pregnancy hormones protected against depression, leaving women more vulnerable to the illness only after the baby was born and their hormone levels plunged." This is a possible explanation as to why antenatal depression has just recently been identified.

== Prevalence and causes ==
The prevalence of antenatal depression differs slightly by region of world. In the United States, antenatal depression is experienced in as many as 16% of pregnant women, while in South Asia it is experienced in as many as 24% of pregnant women. It's becoming more prevalent as more medical studies are being done. Antenatal depression was once thought to simply be the normal stress associated with any pregnancy, and was waved off as a common ailment. It can be caused by many factors, usually though involving aspects of the mothers personal life, such as family, economic standing, relationship status, etc. It can also be caused by hormonal and physical changes that are associated with pregnancy. Additional risk factors include lack of social support, marital dissatisfaction, discriminatory work environments, history of domestic abuse, and unplanned or unwanted pregnancy. Studies have determined that there may be a connection between antenatal and postpartum depression in women with lower vitamin D levels. There is a higher risk of antenatal depression in woman living in low-income countries who deal with less access to quality healthcare, have economic issues, and don't have a good support system.

Antenatal depression is also experienced by parents who identify as part of the LGBTQ+ community. Literature on the experiences of pregnancy amongst transgender men reveals that sources of antenatal depression amongst pregnant transgender men arise from gender dysphoria. Where feelings of isolation and loneliness are already reported high amongst this particular group, the experiences they commonly face during their pregnancy exacerbate those feelings.

== Screening ==
Perinatal mental health screenings are important in detecting and diagnosing antenatal and postpartum depression early. The American College of Obstetricians and Gynecologists is one of the many maternal health organizations that strongly encourage universal screening for expectant and postpartum women for depression as part of routine obstetric care. In fact, many states, including California have already legislated laws that require providers to screen patients during visits because they recognize that early screenings can expedite the process in receiving effective treatment. The Patient Health Questionnaire 9 (PHQ-9) is a screening tool typically used to detect depression. Another tool, the Edinburgh Postnatal Depression Scale, was developed for the postnatal period, but has also been validated for use during pregnancy.

PHQ-9 is a reliable depression severity scale that was formulated in accordance with DSM-IV criteria for depression, consisting of 9 items correlating to the 9 criteria listed in DSM-IV. It is a shortened version of the PHQ and has been assessed for comparable sensitivity and specificity. The screening test is self-administered to patients and are usually performed at the primary care clinic.

However, it is not enough to just provide mental health screenings to at risk patients. Interventions such as referrals to treatment and mental health monitoring should be implemented in health care systems in order to ensure these women are helped consistently throughout their recovery journey.

Studies suggest that obese woman tend to develop mental health issues more frequently and should discuss any symptoms with their doctor at the first prenatal appointment.

== Treatment ==
Treatment for antenatal depression poses many challenges because the baby is also affected by any treatment given to the mother. There are both non-pharmacological and pharmacological treatment options which can be considered by women with antenatal depression.

=== Non-pharmacological therapy ===
==== Psychotherapy ====
Psychotherapy is recommended for any woman with antenatal depression, as it is an effective way for the mother to express her feelings in her own words. Specifically, cognitive behavioral therapy effectively helps decrease symptoms of antenatal depression. In addition to psychotherapy, being seen by a psychiatrist is recommended as they can assess if medications will be beneficial and make specific medication recommendations, if warranted. Familial support may also play a role in helping with the emotional aspects of antenatal depression.

While mental health specialists are trained in providing counseling interventions, results from a recent systematic review and meta-analysis of the literature found that nonspecialist providers, such as lay counselors, nurses, midwives, and teachers with no formal training in counseling interventions, often fill a gap in providing effective services related to depression and anxiety treatments.

==== Exercise therapy ====
Studies suggest that forms of exercise can help with depressive symptoms both before and after birth, but not prevent it entirely.

Exercise options that have been studied to help reduce symptoms:

- Yoga
- Walking
- Stretching
- Aerobic exercise

=== Medications ===
When discussing medication options for antenatal depression, it is important to ask the prescribing healthcare provider to share more details about all the risks and benefits of the available medications. During pregnancy, there are two main kinds of antidepressants used during pregnancy; tricyclic antidepressants (TCAs) and selective serotonin reuptake inhibitors (SSRIs). Once prescribed, anti-depressant medication has been found to be extremely effective in treating antenatal depression. Patients can expect to feel an improvement in mood in roughly 2 to 3 weeks on average, and can begin to feel themselves truly connect with their baby. Reported benefits of medication include returned appetite, increased mood, increased energy, and better concentration. Side effects are minor, though they are reported in some cases. Currently, no abnormalities of the baby have been associated with the use of antidepressants during pregnancy. It may be true that maternal SSRI use during pregnancy can lead to difficulty for their newborn adjusting to conditions outside of the womb immediately following birth. Some studies indicate that infants with exposure to SSRIs in the second and third trimester were more likely to be admitted to intensive care following their birth for respiratory, cardiac, low weight and other reasons, and that infants with prenatal SSRI exposure exhibited less motor control upon delivery than infants who were not exposed to SSRIs. Newborns who were exposed to SSRIs for five months or more prior to birth were at a greater risk for lower Apgar scores 1 and 5 minutes after delivery, indicating they were of lesser health than newborns who were not exposed to SSRIs before birth. However, prenatal SSRI exposure was not found to have a significant impact the long-term mental and physical health of the children. These results are not independent of any effects of prenatal depression on infants.

== Connection to postpartum depression and parenting stress ==
Studies have found a strong link between antenatal depression and postpartum depression in women. In other words, women who have antenatal depression are very likely to also develop postpartum depression. The cause of this is based on the continuation of the antenatal depression into postpartum. In a logistical light, it makes sense that women who are depressed during their pregnancy will also be depressed following the birth of their child. This being said there are some factors that determine exclusively the presence of postpartum depression that are not necessarily linked with antenatal depression. These examples include variables like socioeconomic class and if a pregnancy was planned or not.

In reference to a recent study by Coburn et al., the authors found that in addition to prenatal effects, higher maternal depressive symptoms during the postpartum period (12 weeks) were associated with more infant health concerns. This is consistent with other findings among low-SES Mexican-American women and their infants. Women with prenatal depressive symptoms are more likely to develop postpartum depression, which can also have negative consequences on children, such as emotional and behavior problems, attachment difficulties, cognitive deficits, physical growth and development, and feeding habits and attitudes. Related, maternal depression affects parenting behaviors, which in turn could affect child outcomes. Thus, women's mental health throughout the perinatal period should be a priority, not only to support women, but also to promote optimal functioning for their infants.

== Antenatal depression and infant health ==
Depression during pregnancy is associated with an increased risk of spontaneous abortion. In a review by Frazier et al., acute and chronic stress during pregnancy can diminish proper immunological activity crucial during pregnancy, and can possibly induce spontaneous abortion. There is still a debate on whether the miscarriage is due to the depressive disease state or the anti-depressant medication. A large study conducted in Denmark observed that there was a higher incidence of first trimester miscarriage in depressed women not exposed to SSRI compared to non-depressed women exposed to SSRI, indicating that the miscarriage may be associated with the psychological state of the mother rather than the anti-depressant.

Depressive symptoms in pregnant women are linked with poor health outcomes in infants. The rates of hospitalization are found increased for infants who are born to women with high depression levels during pregnancy. Reduced breastfeeding, poor physical growth, lower birth weight, early gestational age and high rates of diarrheal infection are some of the reported outcomes of poor health among infants born to depressed pregnant women. In fact, positive antenatal screenings administered in the first or third trimester are found to be high risk factors for early cessation in breastfeeding. Studies also report that the environmental effects of maternal depression affect the developing fetus to such an extent that the impact can be seen during adulthood of the offspring. The effects are worse for women from low socio-economic backgrounds. In a recent study by Coburn et al., maternal prenatal depressive symptoms predicted significantly higher number of infant health concerns at 12-weeks (3 months) of age. The health concerns included rash, colic, cold, fever, cough, diarrhea, ear infections, and vomiting. Additional concerns for women in low-income backgrounds includes low birth rate and preterm births.

An interesting and informative area of research has been done to see the role of confounding variables in relationship of maternal prenatal depression with infant health concerns. Age of mother, romantic partner, education, household income, immigrant status, and number of other children, breastfeeding, gestational age, birth weight are some of the mediating or moderating factors which are found correlated with infant health concerns. The studies of post-partum depressive symptoms are relatively more than those of prenatal depression and the studies should look into the role of various factors during pregnancy that may impact the health of infants, even continuing into adulthood.

== Male perspective for antenatal depression ==
More than 10% of father experience paternal perinatal depression (PPND). Symptoms are common displayed as fatigue or changes in sleep and eating patterns. A systematic review done in 2016 also found that 4–16% of men experienced anxiety during the antenatal period. Men whose partners are women struggling with antenatal or postnatal depression often find themselves receiving less affection and intimacy from their partners. If symptoms of antenatal depression arise in mothers, it is recommended for fathers to provide encouragement for their partners to discuss their condition with a healthcare provider. It is also important for the father to seek support for themselves. Fathers who experience depression are more likely to spank their children and less likely to interact with them. In a research study performed in Sweden observing 366,499 births, newly diagnosed paternal depression around the time of conception or during pregnancy was associated with an increased risk of preterm birth. However, a preexisting paternal depression did not show any correlation, which may be due to the mother's perception of the changes in their partner's mood.

== See also ==
- Depression
- Gender disappointment
- Postpartum psychosis
