= Postpartum blues =

- Other names: Baby blues, maternity blues
- Specialty: Psychiatry, obstetrics and gynecology
- Symptoms: Tearfulness, mood swings, irritability, anxiety, fatigue, difficulty sleeping or eating
- Usual onset: Within a few days of childbirth
- Duration: Up to 2 weeks
- Differential diagnosis: Postpartum depression, postpartum anxiety, postpartum psychosis
- Treatment: Supportive
- Medication: No medication indicated
- Prognosis: Self-limited
- Frequency: Up to 85%

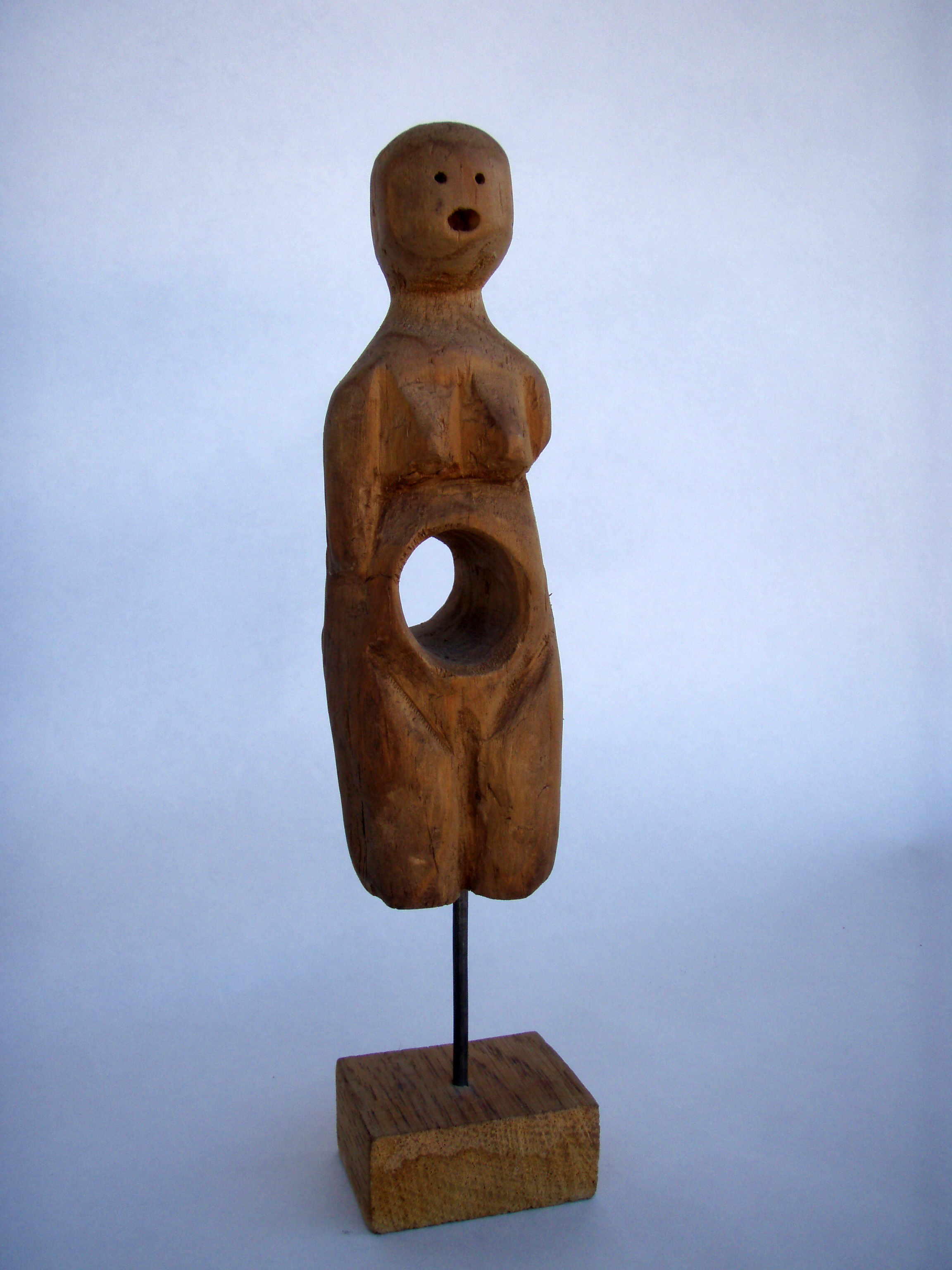
A representation of the loss and emptiness felt after childbirth.

Postpartum blues, also known as baby blues and maternity blues, is a very common but self-limited condition that begins shortly after childbirth and can present with a variety of symptoms such as mood swings, irritability, and tearfulness. Mothers may experience negative mood symptoms mixed with intense periods of joy. Up to 85% of new mothers are affected by postpartum blues, with symptoms starting within a few days after childbirth and lasting up to two weeks in duration. Treatment is supportive, including ensuring adequate sleep and emotional support. If symptoms are severe enough to affect daily functioning or last longer than two weeks, the individual should be evaluated for related postpartum psychiatric conditions, such as postpartum depression and postpartum anxiety. It is unclear whether the condition can be prevented, however education and reassurance are important to help alleviate patient distress.

== Signs and symptoms ==
Symptoms of postpartum blues can vary significantly from one individual to another, and from one pregnancy to the next. Many symptoms of postpartum blues overlap both with normal symptoms experienced by new parents and with postpartum depression. Individuals with postpartum blues have symptoms that are milder and less disruptive to their daily functioning compared to those with postpartum depression. Symptoms of postpartum blues include, but are not limited to:

- Tearfulness or crying "for no reason"
- Mood swings
- Irritability
- Anxiety
- Questioning one's ability to care for the baby
- Difficulty making choices
- Loss of appetite
- Fatigue
- Difficulty sleeping
- Difficulty concentrating
- Negative mood symptoms interspersed with positive symptoms

=== Onset ===
Symptoms appear within 4 weeks of delivery and can last for years. (49)

=== Duration ===
Postpartum blues may last a few days up to two weeks. If symptoms last more than two weeks, evaluation for postpartum depression is recommended by the American Psychiatric Association.

== Causes ==
The causes of postpartum blues have not been clearly established. Most hypotheses regarding the etiology of postpartum blues and postpartum depression center on the intersection of the significant biological and psychosocial changes that occur with childbirth.

=== Psychosocial causes ===
Pregnancy and postpartum are significant life events that increase a woman's vulnerability for postpartum blues. Even with a planned pregnancy, it is normal to have feelings of doubt or regret, and it takes time to adjust to having a newborn. Feelings commonly reported by new parents and lifestyle changes that may contribute to developing early postpartum mood symptoms include:

- Fatigue after labor and delivery
- Caring for a newborn that requires 24/7 attention
- Sleep deprivation
- Lack of support from family and friends
- Marital or relationship strain
- Changes in home and work routines
- Financial stress
- Unrealistic expectations of self
- Societal or cultural pressure to "bounce back" quickly after pregnancy and childbirth
- Overwhelmed and questioning ability to care for baby
- Anger, loss, or guilt, especially for parents of premature or sick infants

=== Risk factors ===
Most risk factors studied have not clearly and consistently demonstrated an association with postpartum blues. These include sociodemographic factors, such as age and marital status, and obstetric factors, such as delivery complications or low birth weight.

Factors most consistently shown to be predictive of postpartum blues are personal and family history of depression. This is of particular interest given of the bidirectional relationship between postpartum blues and postpartum depression: a history of postpartum depression appears to be a risk factor for developing postpartum blues, and postpartum blues confers a higher risk of developing subsequent postpartum depression.

== Pathophysiology ==
=== Estrogen and progesterone ===
After delivery of the placenta, mothers experience an abrupt decline of gonadal hormones, namely estrogen and progesterone. Major hormonal changes in the early postpartum period may trigger mood symptoms similarly to how more minor hormonal shifts cause mood swings prior to menstrual periods.

Studies have not detected a consistent association between hormone concentrations and development of postpartum mood disorders. Some investigators believe the discrepant results may be due to variations in sensitivity to hormonal shifts across different subgroups of women. Therefore, development of mood symptoms may be related to a woman's sensitivity, based on genetic predisposition and psychosocial stressors, to changes in hormones rather than absolute hormonal levels.

=== Other ===
The association between postpartum blues and a variety of other biological factors, including cortisol and the HPA axis, tryptophan, prolactin, thyroid hormone, and others have been assessed over the years with inconclusive results. Prolactin contributes to providing the correct amount of energy to support the mother and the fetus/offspring during pregnancy and lactation, but it also has a homeostatic role.

Emerging research has suggested a potential association between the gut microbiome and perinatal mood and anxiety disorders.

Although several studies have measured lower levels of allopregnanolone associated with postpartum depression, and identified lower allopregnanolone levels as a risk factor for postpartum depression, many others fail to demonstrate such a relationship. Those studies that do suggest a relationship demonstrate reductions in allopregnanolone levels in women with a risk of developing postpartum depression, a reduction in women experiencing postpartum blues, and a negative correlation with depression symptoms in postpartum women.

== Diagnosis ==
=== Classification ===
The proper diagnostic classification of postpartum blues has not been clearly established. Postpartum blues has long been considered to be the mildest condition on the spectrum of postpartum psychiatric disorders, which includes postpartum depression and postpartum psychosis. However, there exists some discussion in the literature of the possibility that postpartum blues may be an independent condition.

=== Criteria ===
There are no standardized criteria for the diagnosis of postpartum blues. Unlike postpartum depression, postpartum blues is not a diagnosis included in the Diagnostic and Statistical Manual of Mental Disorders.

Investigators have employed a variety of diagnostic tools in prospective and retrospective studies of postpartum blues, including repurposing screening tools, such as the Edinburgh Postnatal Depression Scale (EPDS) and Beck Depression Index (BDI), as well as developing blues-specific scales. Examples of blues-specific scales include the Maternity Blues Questionnaire and the Stein Scale.

=== Differential diagnosis ===
Although symptoms of postpartum blues present in a majority of mothers and the condition is self-limited, it is important to keep related psychiatric conditions in mind as they all have overlap in presentation and similar period of onset.

Postpartum anxiety
Symptoms of anxiety and irritability are often predominant in the presentation of postpartum blues. However, compared to postpartum anxiety, symptoms of postpartum blues are less severe, resolve on their own, and last fewer than two weeks.
Postpartum depression
Postpartum depression and postpartum blues may be indistinguishable when symptoms first begin. However, symptoms of postpartum blues are less severe, resolve on their own, and last fewer than two weeks. Mothers who experience severe postpartum blues appear to be at increased risk of developing depression.
Postpartum psychosis
Although both conditions can cause periods of high and low moods, the mood swings in postpartum psychosis are significantly more severe and may include mania, hallucinations, and delusions. Postpartum psychosis is a rare condition, affecting 1-2 per 1000 women. Postpartum psychosis is classified as a psychiatric emergency and requires hospital admission.

Additionally, a variety of medical co-morbidities can mimic or worsen psychiatric symptoms.

== Prevention ==
=== Screening ===
There are no specific screening recommendations for postpartum blues. Nonetheless, a variety of professional organizations recommend routine screening for depression and/or assessment of emotional well-being during pregnancy and postpartum. Universal screening provides an opportunity to identify women with sub-clinical psychiatric conditions during this period and those at higher risk of developing more severe symptoms. Specific recommendations are listed below:

- American College of Obstetrics and Gynecology (ACOG): In 2018, ACOG recommended universal screening for depression and anxiety using a validated tool at least once during pregnancy or postpartum, in addition to a full assessment of mood and well-being at the postpartum visit. This is in addition to existing recommendations for annual depression screening in all women.
- American Academy of Pediatrics (AAP): In 2017, the AAP recommended universal screening of mothers for postpartum depression at the 1-, 2-, 4-, and 6-month well child visits.
- United States Preventative Services Task Force (USPSTF): In 2016, the USPSTF recommended depression screening in the general adult population, including pregnant and postpartum women. Their recommendations did not include guidelines for frequency of screening.

=== Primary prevention ===
Given the mixed evidence regarding causes of postpartum blues, it is unclear whether prevention strategies would be effective in decreasing the risk of developing this condition. However, educating women during pregnancy about postpartum blues may help to prepare them for these symptoms that are often unexpected and concerning in the setting of excitement and anticipation of a new baby. Mothers who develop postpartum blues often have significant shame or guilt for feelings of anxiety or depression during a time that is expected to be joyful. It is important to reassure new parents that low mood symptoms after childbirth are common and transient. Obstetric providers may recommend that patients and their families prepare ahead of time to ensure the mother will have adequate support and rest after the delivery. Additionally, they should provide education and resources to family and friends about red flags of more severe perinatal psychiatric conditions that may develop, such as postpartum depression and postpartum psychosis.

== Treatment ==
Postpartum blues is a self-limited condition. Signs and symptoms are expected to resolve within two weeks of onset without any treatment. Nevertheless, there are a number of recommendations to help relieve symptoms, including:

- Getting enough sleep
- Taking time to relax and do activities that you enjoy
- Asking for help from family and friends
- Reaching out to other new parents
- Avoiding alcohol and other drugs that may worsen mood symptoms
- Reassurance that symptoms are very common and will resolve on their own

Additional supportive interventions have also been studied. Structured peer-support programs, even those delivered through telephone conversations, have been shown to reduce postpartum mood symptoms. A randomized clinical trial found that mothers who received scheduled peer support during the late stages of pregnancy and continuing into the first two months of the postpartum period had significantly lower depression scores at two months postpartum compared to mothers receiving routine care. Another qualitative study demonstrated that consistent social support from partners, family, and peers is an important component in the postpartum period, but is oftentimes variable due to stigma, cultural differences, and limited follow-up conversations.

If symptoms do not resolve within two weeks or if they interfere with functioning, individuals are encouraged to contact their healthcare provider. Early diagnosis and treatment of more severe postpartum psychiatric conditions, such as postpartum depression, postpartum anxiety, and postpartum psychosis, are critical for improved outcomes in both the parent and child.

== Prognosis ==
Most mothers who develop postpartum blues experience complete resolution of symptoms by two weeks. However, a number of prospective studies have identified more severe postpartum blues as an independent risk factor for developing subsequent postpartum depression. More research is necessary to fully elucidate the association between postpartum blues and postpartum depression.

== Epidemiology ==
Postpartum blues is a very common condition, affecting around 50–80% of new mothers based on most sources. However, estimates of prevalence vary greatly in the literature, from 26 to 85%, depending on the criteria used. Precise rates are difficult to obtain given lack of standardized diagnostic criteria, inconsistency of presentation to medical care, and methodological limitations of retrospective reporting of symptoms.

Evidence demonstrates that postpartum blues exists across a variety of countries and cultures, however there is considerable heterogeneity in reported prevalence rates. For instance, reports of prevalence of postpartum blues in the literature vary from 15% in Japan to 60% in Iran. Underreporting of symptoms due to cultural norms and expectations may be one explanation for this heterogeneity.

== Males ==
Literature is lacking on whether new fathers also experience postpartum blues. However, given similar causes of postpartum blues and postpartum depression in women, it may be relevant to examine rates of postpartum depression in men.

Additional research has examined the presentation and impact of paternal postpartum mood symptoms. Paternal postpartum depression can emerge anytime within the first year after childbirth, and typically presents as irritability, low mood, sleep disruption, appetite changes, and loss of interest in usual activities.

Fathers experiencing symptoms of postpartum depression frequently report uncertainty about whether their symptoms are legitimate and whether they should receive support for them. A qualitative study highlighted that many fathers experience stress related to their new role changes, partner expectations, and limited mental health resources for themselves.

A 2010 meta-analysis published in JAMA with over 28,000 participants across various countries showed that prenatal and postpartum depression affects about 10% of men. This analysis was updated by an independent research team in 2016, who found the prevalence to be 8.4% in over 40,000 participants. Both were significantly higher than previously reported rates of 3–4% from two large cohort studies in the United Kingdom, which may reflect heterogeneity across countries. Both meta-analyses found higher rates in the United States (12.8–14.1%) compared to studies conducted internationally (7.1–8.2%). Furthermore, there was a moderate positive correlation between paternal and maternal depression (r = 0.308; 95% CI, 0.228–0.384).
