= Maternal and Child Health Handbook =

Handbook issued by Japanese municipalities

A Maternal and Child Health Handbook (母子健康手帳, boshi kenkō techō) is a handbook issued by Japanese municipalities as stipulated by the Maternal and Child Health Act to record the health conditions of mothers and children throughout pregnancy, childbirth, and childcare. It also serves as a primary resource book of health guidance for expectant and nursing mothers and infants, as well as a child-rearing textbook for parents of infants and toddlers. The first half of the handbook includes a section for recording pregnancy and childbirth, and for a newborn baby, there is a section for periodic health examinations, immunizations (diphtheria, pertussis, tetanus, polio, measles, etc.), and dental examinations until the child enters elementary school. The latter half is designed by each municipality, taking advantage of the regional characteristics.

== Overview ==
Those who become pregnant must promptly notify the head of the municipality of their pregnancy (Maternal and Child Health Act, Article 15), and upon receipt of the notification, the municipality shall issue them a Maternal and Child Health Handbook (Maternal and Child Health Act, Article 16, Clause 1). The handbook can be issued regardless of nationality or age.

The following information must be included in the notification of pregnancy (Enforcement Regulations of the Maternal and Child Health Act, Article 3).

- Notification date
- Name, age, My Number (the Japanese social security number), and occupation
- Place of residence
- Months of pregnancy
- Name of physician or midwife, if any, who has provided diagnosis or health guidance
- Whether or not the applicant has undergone medical examinations for sexually transmitted diseases and tuberculosis

The Maternal and Child Health Handbook shall have a page indicating the following (Maternal and Child Health Act, Article 16, Clause 3 and Enforcement Regulations of the Maternal and Child Health Act, Article 7).

- Guidelines for the health management of expectant and nursing mothers, such as everyday precautions, recommendations for physical examinations, nutritional intake methods, and dental hygiene.
- Information necessary for the care of infants and toddlers, such as childcare precautions, disease prevention, nutritional intake methods, and dental hygiene.
- Details on vaccinations, including types of vaccinations, dates and precautions for inoculation.
- Information that contributes to the improvement of maternal and child health care, including an overview of the maternal and child health care system and the Children’s Charter.
- Matters to note when using the Maternal and Child Health Handbook, such as procedures for its re-issuance.

In addition, each municipality may include its unique content, and there is also a section for the mothers to record the growth of their children. Moreover, municipalities with particularly large foreign resident populations — such as Kawasaki City and Yokohama City in Kanagawa Prefecture and Hamamatsu City in Shizuoka Prefecture — have created their own Maternal and Child Health Handbooks written in languages other than Japanese.

Pregnant women and nursing mothers must have the necessary information written in the Maternal and Child Health Handbook each time they receive medical examinations or health guidance from a doctor, dentist, midwife, or public health nurse. The same shall apply to guardians of infants or young children who have received health examinations or health guidance (Maternal and Child Health Act, Article 16, Clause 2 ). When the child enters or enrolls in a kindergarten, nursery school, or elementary school, confirmation for the recorded information may be requested.

Some organizations have published booklets accompanying the Maternal and Child Health Handbook, which are also employed by local governments. Known examples include Little Baby Handbook for children born weighing less than 1500 grams (3.3 pounds), Twins Handbook for children born of multiple births, and +Happy Seeds of Happiness for children with Down syndrome.

Even if it is no longer needed, it is advised to keep the Maternal and Child Health Handbook, because it will be useful in confirming vaccination history and underlying health conditions as an adult.

== Spread to the world ==
The Maternal and Child Health Handbook was originally developed in Japan. However, in the 1980s, an Indonesian doctor who was visiting Japan through a training program of the semi-governmental corporation of Japan International Cooperation Agency (JICA) noticed its effectiveness in contributing to the health of mothers and children and decided to promote it in his own country. With the help of the JICA, Indonesia began distributing the handbooks on a trial basis in 1989. Recognizing its effectiveness, the Japanese government also began to support the project, and since 1998, it has been promoted as the “Mother and Child Health Handbook Project.” The Indonesian version of the Maternal and Child Health Handbook is larger (A5 notebook size, about 5-7/8 x 8-1/4 in) than the Japanese handbook. It is designed to be understandable to even illiterate mothers by using abundant illustrations. It is also expected to be used as a simplified childcare book.

Since 2007, Indonesia has been helping to spread the project in Palestine and Afghanistan. The success in Indonesia has led the Japan International Cooperation Agency to provide training guidance to promote awareness of the handbook in South America and Africa.
