= Edinburgh Postnatal Depression Scale =

10-item questionnaire

- Purpose: identify postpartum depression

The Edinburgh Postnatal Depression Scale (EPDS) is a 10-item questionnaire that was developed to identify women who have postpartum depression. Items of the scale correspond to various clinical depression symptoms, such as guilt feeling, sleep disturbance, low energy, anhedonia, and suicidal ideation. Overall assessment is done by total score, which is determined by adding together the scores for each of the 10 items. Higher scores indicate more depressive symptoms. The EPDS may be used within 8 weeks postpartum and it also can be applied for depression screening during pregnancy.

The Edinburgh Postnatal Depression Scale is a widely used depression screening tool, which has been adapted and validated in many languages.

== History ==
The Edinburgh Postnatal Depression Scale was first developed (1987) by Scottish health centres in Edinburgh and Livingston.

== See also ==
- Diagnostic classification and rating scales used in psychiatry
