= Soy formula =

Substitute for human breast milk

Soy formula or soy-based baby formula is a substitute for human breast milk. It is a commercial product based on the proteins found in soybeans. Soy infant formula uses processed soybeans as its source of protein, and comes in powdered or liquid form. Usually lactose-free, soy infant formula contains a different sugar. Infants who are intolerant of cows' milk protein may also be intolerant of soy protein. It differs from human breast milk in a number of ways. Soy protein inhibits the absorption of iron. The soy-based formulas discussed by the World Health Organization reports that soy formula is fortified with iron to compensate for this effect. One naturally occurring plant-based compound found in soy-based infant formula is phytic acid. It is also a strong inhibitor of iron absorption, though it can be removed in processing. It is not known how many manufacturers of soy-based formula incorporate this practice. China and Vietnam have regulated soy-based infant formulas to include NaFeEDTA (sodium-feric ethylenediaminetetraacetic acid) to fortify the formula and enhance the absorption of iron by the infant. When iron compounds are added to soy-based infant formula, the iron compound is encapsulated to prevent it from making the formula dark.

== Constituents ==
Genetically modified ingredients may be present in soy-based infant formula. It may also be of lower nutritional value. Soy-based infant formula can have aluminum, phytates, and phytoestrogens (isoflavones) that might cause unanticipated effects. Other constituents are amino acids: such as taurine, methionine, and carnitine. Added minerals are phosphore, calcium, iron, and zinc. SIF also contains soy-isolate that supplies 95% of protein.

== Indications ==
Breastfeeding is still the best option for feeding infants. There are instances when breastfeeding is not possible and the use of formula is appropriate.

Indications for the use of soy-based infant formula are galactosaemia and lactase deficiency. When a child develops an allergy to cows' milk, soy-based formula is used. SBF is less costly than other breast milk formula substitutes.

== History ==
Past reports of the effects of soy formula have suggested that a constituent of soy formula may affect reproductive functions. However, studies have shown that no correlation exists between the consumption of soy formula and abnormality in reproductive anatomy or function. Soy-based infant formula has been used for over the past 100 years. By late 1800s and the early 1900s, supplementation of breastfeeding with formula was acceptable. Soy-based formula was used as early as 1909.

== Allergies and other concerns ==
Soy-based infant formula is associated with allergies in infants. Chronic food protein-induced enterocolitis syndrome (FPIES) has been observed in infants aged younger than three months who were fed with soy formula. France has taken soy-based infant formula off the market. Soy-base formula accounts for about 20% of the infant formula purchased in the US. In New Zealand formula use is around 10%, and in Belgium and the UK and about 5%.

== See also ==
- Breast milk jewelry
- Lactivism
- Baby Gaga
- Allergies in children
