= Human milk microbiome =

Community of microorganisms in human milk

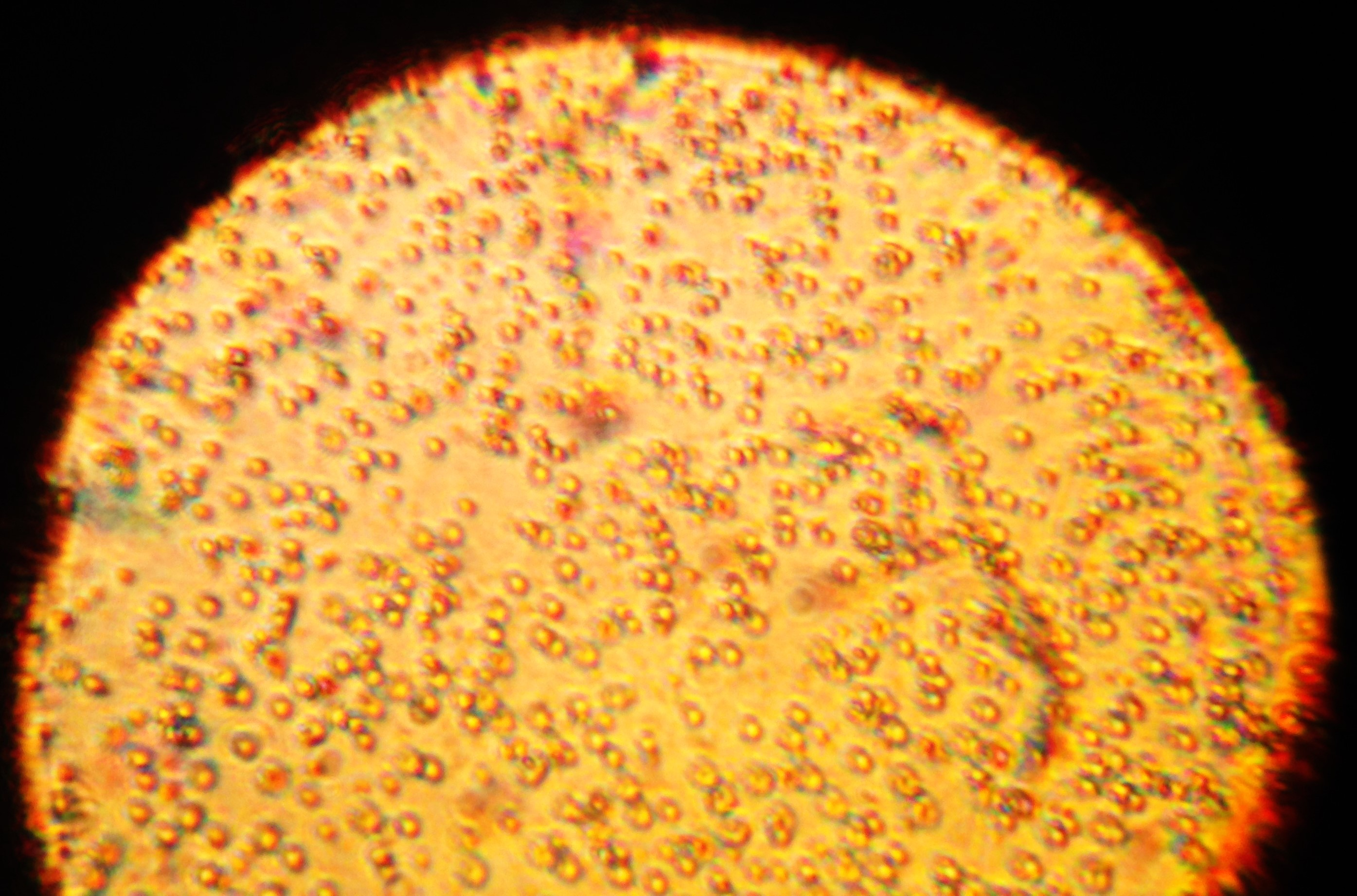
A microscopy image of a sample of human breast milk

The human milk microbiota, also known as human milk probiotics (HMP), encompasses the microbiota–the community of microorganisms–present within the human mammary glands and breast milk. Contrary to the traditional belief that human breast milk is sterile, advancements in both microbial culture and culture-independent methods have confirmed that human milk harbors diverse communities of bacteria. These communities are distinct in composition from other microbial populations found within the human body which constitute the human microbiome.

The microbiota in human milk serves as a potential source of commensal, mutualistic, and potentially probiotic bacteria for the infant gut microbiota. The World Health Organization (WHO) defines probiotics as "living organisms which, when administered in adequate amounts, confer a health benefit on the host."

== Occurrence ==
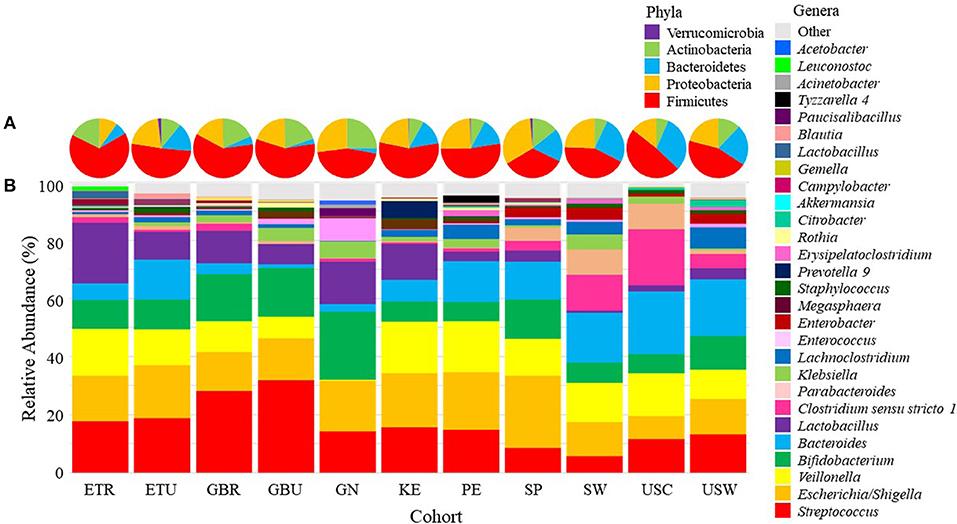
Graphic of bacterial phyla and 10 commonest genera in human milk

Breast milk is a natural source of lactic acid bacteria for the newborn through breastfeeding, and may be considered a symbiotic food. The normal concentration of bacteria in milk from healthy women was about 103 colony-forming units (CFU) per milliliter. The milk's bacterial communities were generally complex. Among the hundreds of operational taxonomic units detected in the milk of every woman, only nine (Streptococcus, Staphylococcus, Serratia, Pseudomonas, Corynebacterium, Ralstonia, Propionibacterium, Sphingomonas, and Nitrobacteraceae) were present in every sample from every woman, but an individual's milk bacterial community was generally stable over time. Human milk is a source of live Staphylococci, Streptococci, lactic acid bacteria, Bifidobacteria, Propionibacteria, Corynebacteria, and closely related Gram-positive bacteria for the infant gut.

== Composition ==
Breast milk was considered to be free of bacteria until about the early 2000s, when lactic acid bacteria were first described in human milk hygienically collected from healthy women. Several studies have shown that there is a mother-to-infant transfer of bacterial strains belonging, at least, to the genera Lactobacillus, Staphylococcus, Enterococcus, and Bifidobacterium through breastfeeding, thus accounting for the close relationship of bacterial composition of the gut microbiota of breastfed infants with that found in the breast milk of their respective mothers. Research has also found that there are similarities between human milk and infant gut microbial flora, suggesting that dietary exposure, such as human milk probiotics, may have a contribution in supporting infant gut microbiota and immune development.

Bacteria commonly isolated in human milk samples include Bifidobacterium, Lactobacillus, Staphylococcus, Streptococcus, Bacteroides, Clostridium, Micrococcus, Enterococcus, and Escherichia. Metagenomic analyses of human milk find it is dominated by Staphylococcus, Pseudomonas, and Edwardsiella. The human milk microbiome likely varies by population and between individual women, however, a study based on a group of U.S. women observed the same nine bacterial taxa in all samples from all of their participants, suggesting a common "core" of the milk microbiome, at least in that population. Bacterial communities of human colostrum have been reported as being more diverse than those found in mature milk.

The three strains of Lactobacilli with probiotic properties that were isolated from breast milk were L. fermentum CECT5716, L. gasseri CECT5714, and L. salivarius CECT5713, with L. fermentum being one of the most abundant strains. Early administration of L. fermentum CECT5716 in infant formula is claimed to be safe and well tolerated for infants one to six months of age, and safe for long term use.

== Origin ==
While the origins of the human milk microbiome are not exactly known, several hypotheses for its establishment have been proposed. Bacteria present in human milk may be derived from the surrounding breast skin flora, or the infant's oral cavity microbiota. Retrograde backflow during nursing or suckling may also lead to bacterial establishment in the mammary ducts, supported by the observation that a certain degree of flowback has been shown to occur during nursing using infrared photography. Alternatively, bacteria may be translocated to the mammary duct from the maternal gastrointestinal tract via an entero-mammary pathway, facilitated by dendritic cells.

== Environmental factors ==
Several factors may influence the composition of human milk probiotics, such as maternal body mass index (BMI), infant sex, birth modality, and mode of breastfeeding. A study done by Soto et al also revealed that Lactobacilli and Bifidobacteria are more commonly found in the human milk of women who did not receive any antibiotics during pregnancy and lactation.

Human milk oligosaccharides (HMOs), a primary component of human milk, are prebiotics which have been shown to promote growth of beneficial Bifidobacterium and Bacteroides species.

=== Maternal health ===
Maternal health status is associated with changes in the bacterial composition of milk. Higher maternal BMI and obesity are associated with changes in the levels of Bifidobacterium and Staphylococcus species and overall lower bacterial diversity. Milk of women with celiac disease is observed to have reduced levels of Bacteroides and Bifidobacterium. Women who are HIV-positive show higher bacterial diversity and increased abundances of Lactobacillus in their milk than do non-HIV-positive women. Mastitis has been linked to changes in human milk microbiota at the phylum level, lower microbial diversity, and decreased abundance of obligate anaerobic taxa.

Women delivering term and preterm show differences in their milk microbiome composition, with mothers of term-births showing lower abundances of Enterococcus species and higher amounts of Bifidobacterium species in their milk compared to mothers of preterm births.

Few studies have been conducted examining the influence of maternal diet on the milk microbiome, but diet is known to influence other aspects of milk composition, such as the lipid profile, which in turn could affect its microbial composition. Variation in the fat and carbohydrate content of the maternal diet may influence the taxonomic composition of the milk microbiome.

Both the taxonomic composition and diversity of bacteria present in human milk likely vary by maternal geographic location, however studies with more geographically diverse participants are needed to better understand variation between populations.

Maternal perinatal antibiotic use is associated with changes in the prevalence of Lactobacillus, Bifidobacterium, Staphylococcus, and Eubacterium in milk.

Social network density of mother-infant dyads was found to be associated with increased bacterial diversity in the milk microbiome of mothers in the Central African Republic.

=== Delivery method ===
Mode of delivery may influence composition of the human milk microbiome. Vaginal births is associated with high taxonomic diversity and high prevalence of Bifidobacterium and Lactobacillus, and the opposite trend being seen with birth by caesarean section, however no relationship between delivery mode and the maternal milk microbiome has also been observed.

=== Lactation stage ===
The human milk microbiome varies across lactation stage, with higher microbial diversity observed in colostrum than in mature milk. Taxonomic composition of human milk also varies across the lactation period, initially dominated by Weissella, Leuconostoc, Staphylococcus, Streptococcus, and Lactococcus species, and later composed primarily of Veillonella, Prevotella, Leptotrichia, Lactobacillus, Streptococcus, Bifidobacterium, and Enterococcus.

== Influences on health ==
Breastfeeding is thought to be an important driver of infant gut microbiome establishment. The gut microbiome of breastfed infants is less diverse, contains higher amounts of Bifidobacterium and Lactobacillus species, and fewer potential pathogenic taxa than the gut microbiome of formula-fed infants. Human milk bacteria may reduce risk of infection in breastfed infants by competitively excluding harmful bacteria, and producing antimicrobial compounds which eliminate pathogenic strains. Certain Lactobacilli and Bifidobacteria, the growth of which is stimulated by HMOs, contribute to healthy metabolic and immune-related functioning in the infant gut.

=== Benefits for breastfeeding mother ===
Breastfeeding is an essential component of maternal health, providing numerous benefits. It has been associated with a decreased risk of metabolic disease, improved immune function, and delayed menstrual cycles. Lactobacillus fermentum, a type of probiotic bacteria, has been identified as a means of reducing the risk of breast cancer. Research studies showed that L. fermentum could improve mastitis, a common inflammatory disease associated with lactation, by reducing the number of Streptococcus load which is believed to be the causal agent and risk factor of mastitis. Additionally, notable benefits of breastfeeding have been theoretically sustained to be able to reduce metabolic diseases such as diabetes and cardiovascular disease. The lactation process requires a substantial amount of energy expenditure, which can mitigate the risk of these diseases. Lactobacillus fermentum has been shown to facilitate weight loss and reduce fat mass, as well as improve insulin sensitivity, thereby helping to prevent diabetes and obesity. Moreover, hormonal changes during lactation can further improve metabolism and glucose homeostasis, suggesting reduction in potential metabolic diseases. However, it is hard to determine the exact factor affecting weight change after birth due to various confounding factors such as pre-pregnancy BMI, weight gain during pregnancy, and social support. A recent meta-analysis of 13 cohort studies have found that breast feeding has been shown to decrease inflammatory markers, such as C-reactive protein and interleukin-6, which are associated with insulin resistance and T2DM.

On the other hand, breastfeeding can also delay menstrual cycles, reducing the risk of iron-deficiency anemia and related health issues. Prolactin, a hormone produced during lactation, suppresses ovulation, preventing the mother from menstruating. This suppression can continue for up to 6 months postpartum, serving as a natural form of birth control.

It is also suggested that in addition to physical benefits, breastfeeding can reduce the risk of postpartum depression. Breastfeeding mothers report less anxiety, less negative mood, and less stress, as well as increased sleep duration and reduced sleep disturbances when compared to formula-feeding mothers. Studies on post-partum depression demonstrate that breastfeeding may protect mothers from this disorder, and researchers have strived to explain the biological processes that explain this protection. For example, lactation attenuates neuro-endocrine responses to stress, and this may be related to fewer post-partum depressive symptoms. Moreover, early breastfeeding cessation was linked to higher risk of post-partum depression. It is the psychological pressure to exclusively breastfeed that contributes to postpartum depression symptoms in mothers unable to achieve their breastfeeding intentions. In a prospective follow-up for eight weeks postpartum, mothers with breastfeeding problems (including mastitis, nipple pain, need for frequent expressing of milk, or over-supply or under-supply of milk) showed poor mental health.

=== Benefit for infants ===
Breastfed children have a lower incidence of infections than formula-fed children, which could be mediated in part through modulation of the intestinal microflora by breast milk components. Indeed, breast-fed infants seem to develop a gut microflora richer in Lactobacilli and Bifidobacteria with reduced pathogenic bacteria compared with formula-fed infants. Research, by Maldonado et al, found that infants receiving a follow-on formula enriched with L. fermentum demonstrated a reduction in gastrointestinal and respiratory infections, thus the administration of such formula may be useful for the prevention of community-acquired gastrointestinal and upper respiratory infections in infants.

Human milk probiotics could also act as pioneering species to increase the colonization of 'beneficial' bacteria and support the infant's immature immune system. It is known that Lactobacilli and Bifidobacteria can suppress the growth of pathogenic microorganisms such as Salmonella typhimurium and Clostridium perfringens by colonization of a child's intestine and competing for nutrients, thus preventing their adhesion. Intestinal colonization by commensal bacteria also plays a vital role in maintaining homeostasis of immune system. These bacteria stimulate the T helper 1 response and counteract the trend towards a T helper 2 response of neonatal immune system, which in turn reducing the incidence of the inflammatory processes such as necrotizing enterocolitis.

Children with colic symptoms possibly have an imbalance in the intestinal microbiota – analyses of faecal samples found higher counts of coliform bacteria and lower counts of Lactobacilli in infants with colic symptoms compared with children not suffering from colic. On the other hand, probiotics have been shown to influence intestinal motility and sensory neurons as well as contractile activity of the intestine and to exert anti-inflammatory effects.

== Evolutionary implications ==
There is some indication of relationships between milk microbiota and other human milk components, including HMOs, maternal cells, and nutrient profiles. Specific bacterial genera have been shown to be associated with variation in levels of milk macronutrients such as lactose, proteins, and fats. HMOs selectively facilitate growth of particular beneficial bacteria, notably Bifidobacterium species. Furthermore, as Bifidobacteria genomes are uniquely equipped to metabolize HMOs, which are otherwise indigestible by enzymes of the infant gut, some have suggested a coevolution between HMOs and certain bacteria common in both the milk and infant gastrointestinal microbiomes. Furthermore, relative to other mammalian milks such as primate milk, human milk appears to be unique with respect to the complexity and diversity of its oligosaccharide repertoire. Human milk is typified by greater overall HMO diversity and predominance of oligosaccharides known to promote growth of Bifidobacterium in the infant gut. Milk microbiota are thought to play an essential role in programming the infant immune system, and tend to reduce the risk of adverse infant health outcomes. Differences in milk oligosaccharides between humans and non-human primates could be indicative of variation in pathogen exposure associated with increased sociality and group sizes. Together, these observations may indicate that milk microbial communities have coevolved with their human host, supported by the expectation that microbes which promote host health facilitate their own transmission and proliferation.

== Comparisons with other mammals ==
Both human and macaque milks contains high abundances of Streptococcus and Lactobacillus bacteria, but differ in their respective relative abundances of these taxa. Bacteria observed to be most common in healthy bovine milk include Ralstonia, Pseudomonas, Sphingomonas, Stenotrophomonas, Psychrobacter, Bradyrhizobium, Corynebacterium, Pelomonas, Staphylococcus, Faecalibacterium, Lachnospiraceae, Propionibacterium, Aeribacillus, Bacteroides, Streptococcus, Anaerococcus, Lactobacillus, Porphyromonas, Comamonas, Fusobacterium, and Enterococcus.

== See also ==
- Human microbiota
- Breast milk
- Human milk oligosaccharide
