= Mary Rose Tully =

American activist (1946–2010)

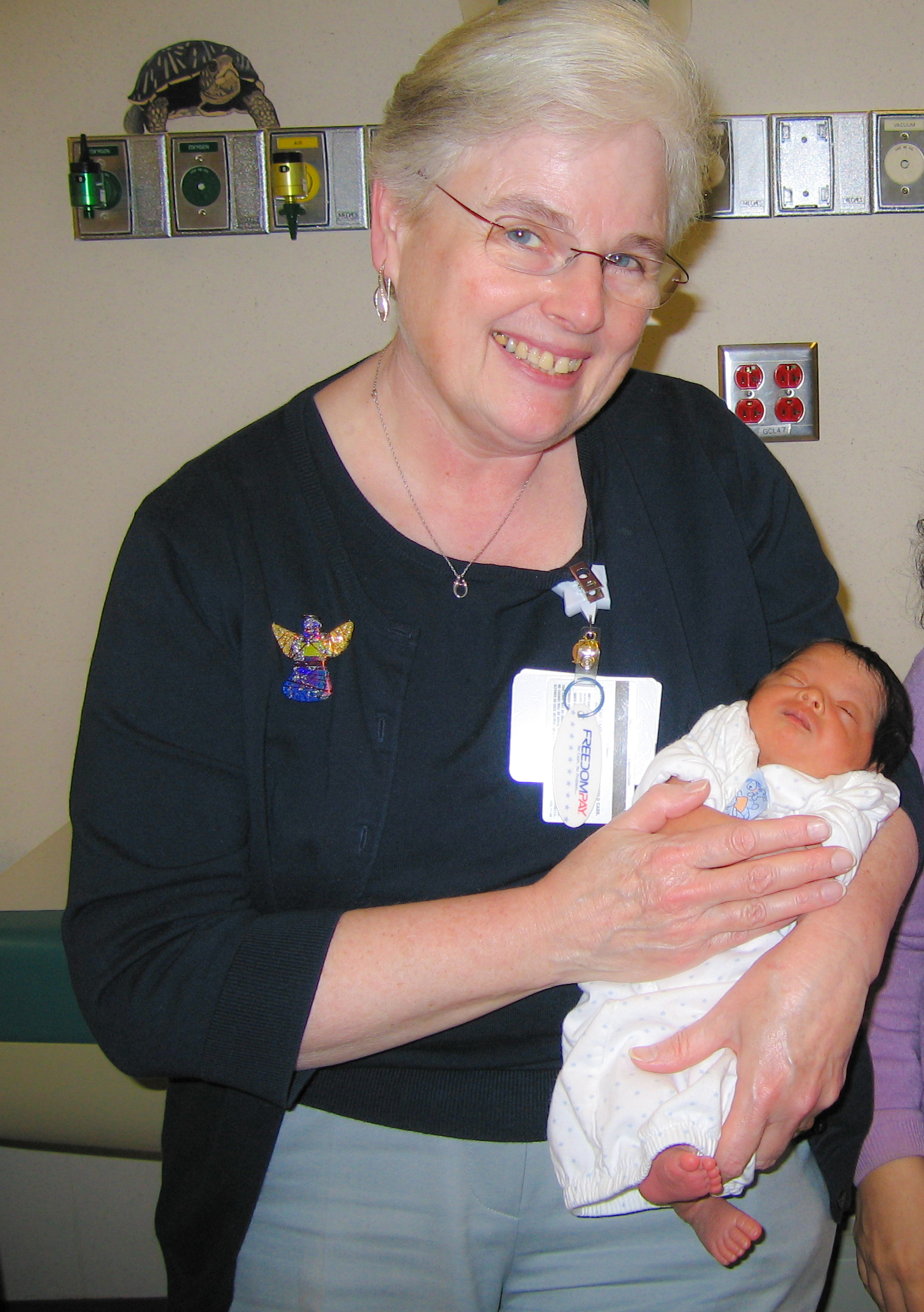
Mary Rose Tully with a 17-day-old patient at UNC Hospital, Chapel Hill, December 8, 2008.

Mary Rose Tully MPH IBCLC (29 July 1946 – 20 January 2010) was an American lactation consultant, director of the Department of Lactation Services at the University of North Carolina's Women's Hospital, and an adjunct clinical instructor of pediatrics at the University of North Carolina's School of Medicine. She researched and helped to expand knowledge of human breast milk. In the mid-1970s, she helped establish the non-profit Piedmont Milk Bank, now known as the WakeMed Mothers' Milk Bank and Lactation Center located in Raleigh, North Carolina. She was a founding member of the Human Milk Banking Association of North America in 1985 and received a lifetime achievement award from the organization in 2007.

== Publications ==
- M R Tully. "Donor Milk Banking". Chapter 33 in Core Curriculum for Lactation Consultant Practice, 2nd ed. Patricia J. Martens, Walker Marsha, editors. Sudbury, MA: Jones and Bartlett Publishers, 2008.
- M R Tully, Lockhart-Borman L, Updegrove K. "Stories of Success: The Use of Donor Milk is Increasing in North America". Journal of Human Lactation, Journal of International Lactation Consultant Association 2004;20:75-77.
- J S LaKind, Birnbach Nettie, Borgert Christopher J, Sonawane Babasaheb R, Tully M R, Friedman Linda. "Human Milk Surveillance and Research of Environmental Chemicals: Concepts for Consideration in Interpreting and Presenting Study Results". Journal of Toxicology and Environmental Health 2002;65(22):1909–1928.
- M R Tully. "Recipient Prioritization and Use of Human Milk in the Hospital Setting". Journal of Human Lactation, Journal of International Lactation Consultant Association 2002;18(4):393-6.
- D B Tully, Jones F, Tully M R. "Donor Milk: What's in It and What's Not". Journal of Human Lactation, Journal of International Lactation Consultant Association 2001;17:152-155.
- M R Tully, Register N, Eren M, Lowdermilk D, Hammond R. "Knowledge and Attitudes of Pediatric Office Nursing Staff about Breastfeeding". Journal of Human Lactation, Journal of International Lactation Consultant Association 2000;16(3):210-5.
- M R Tully. "Year of Remarkable Growth for Donor Milk Banking in North America". Journal of Human Lactation, Journal of International Lactation Consultant Association 2000;16(3):235-236.
- M R Tully. "Recommendations for Handling of Mother's Own Milk". Journal of Human Lactation, Journal of International Lactation Consultant Association 2000;16(2):149-51.
- M R Tully. Cost of Establishing and Operating a Human Milk Bank. Journal of Human Lactation, Journal of International Lactation Consultant Association 2000;16:57-59.
- M R Tully. "Donating Human Milk as Part of the Grieving Process". Journal of Human Lactation, Journal of International Lactation Consultant Association 1999;15:149-151.
- M R Tully. "Human Milk Banking in Sweden and Denmark". Journal of Human Lactation, Journal of International Lactation Consultant Association 1991;7:145-6.
