= Breast milk =

Milk produced by the mammary glands in the breast of a human

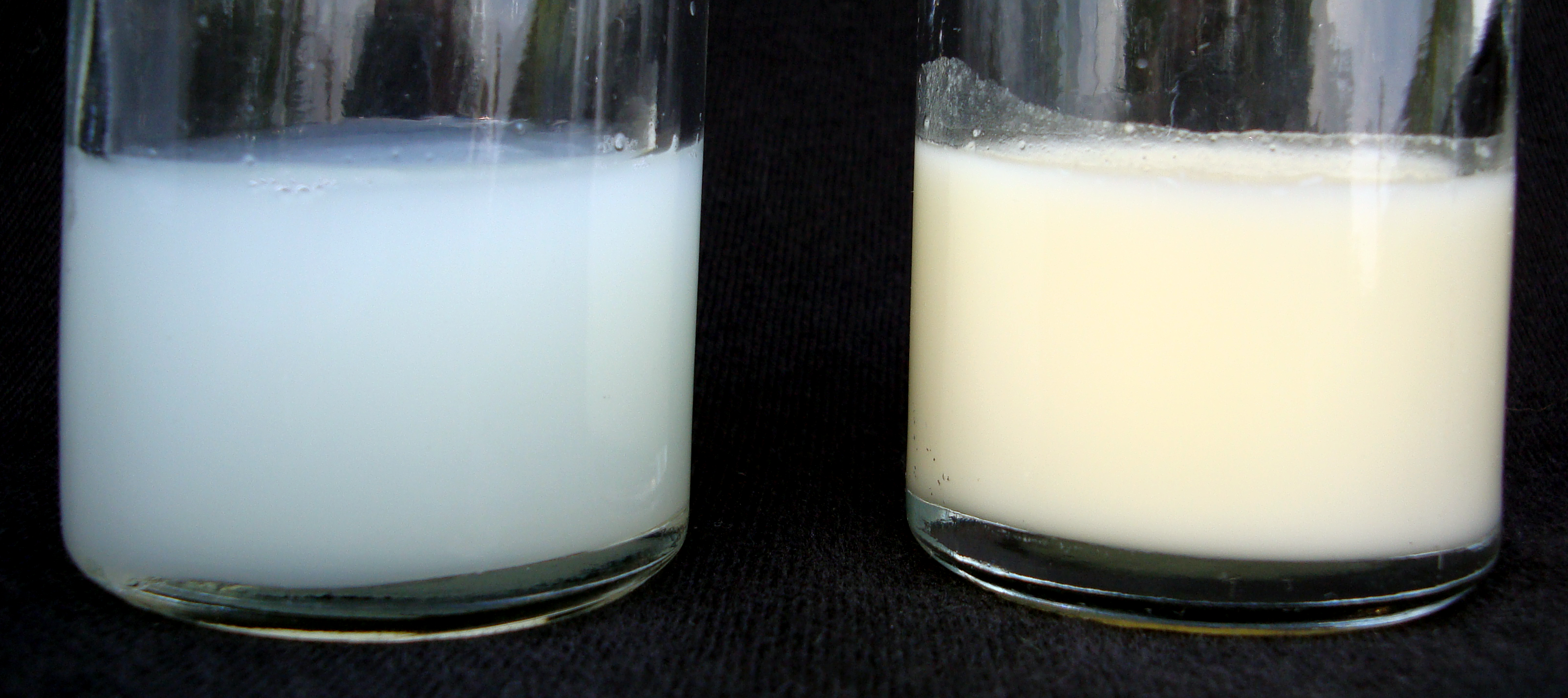
Two samples of human breast milk. The sample on the left is the first milk produced by the mother, while the sample on the right was produced later during the same breast pumping cycle.

Breast milk (sometimes spelled as breastmilk) or mother's milk is milk produced by the mammary glands in the breasts of humans. Breast milk is the primary source of nutrition for newborn infants, comprising fats, proteins, carbohydrates, and a varying composition of minerals and vitamins. Breast milk also contains substances that help protect an infant against infection and inflammation, such as symbiotic bacteria and other microorganisms and immunoglobulin A, whilst also contributing to the healthy development of the infant's immune system and gut microbiome.

== Use and methods of consumption ==
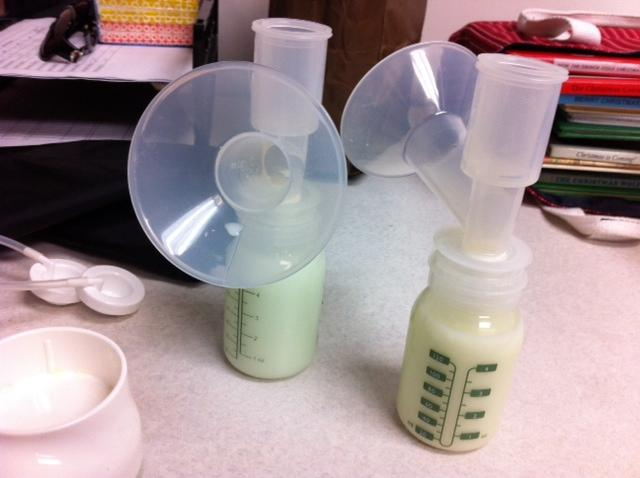
Pumped breast milk in bottles

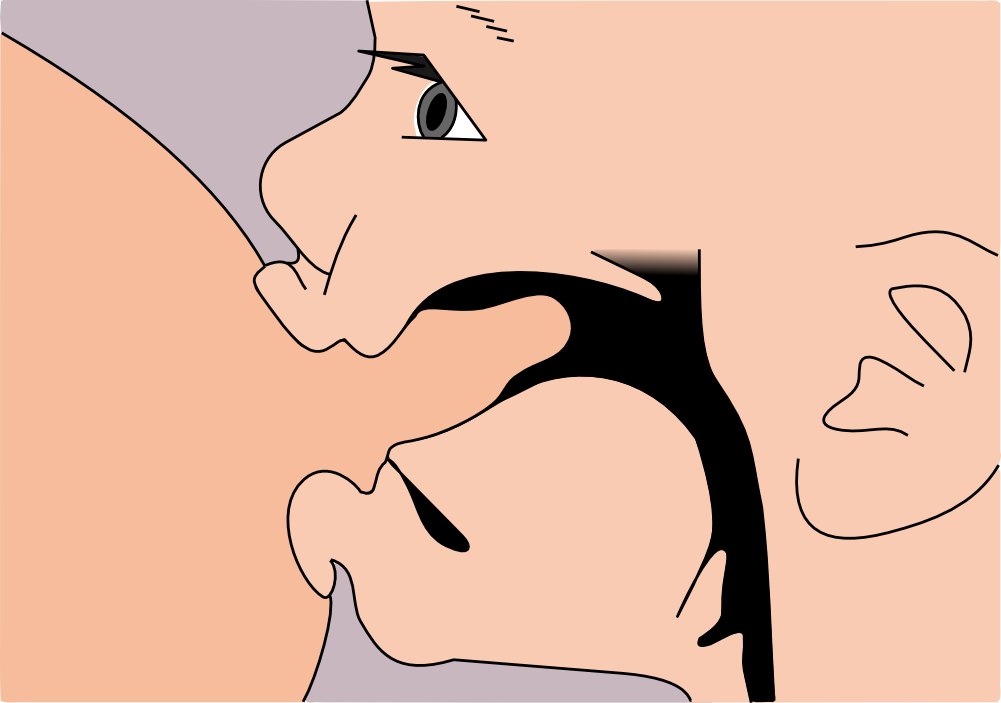
Breast feeding latch

The World Health Organization (WHO) and UNICEF recommend exclusive breastfeeding with breast milk for the first six months of an infant's life. This period is followed by the incorporation of nutritionally adequate and safe complementary solid foods at six months, a stage when an infant's nutrient and energy requirements start to surpass what breast milk alone can provide. Continuation of breastfeeding is recommended up to two years of age. This guidance is due to the protective benefits of breast milk, which include fewer infections such as diarrhea—a protection not afforded by formula milk.

Breast milk constitutes the sole source of nutrition for exclusively breastfed newborns, supplying all necessary nutrients for infants up to six months. Beyond this age, breast milk continues to be a source of energy for children up to two years old, providing over half of a child's energy needs up to the age of one and a third of the needs between one and two years of age.

Despite the capability of most newborns to latch onto the mother's breast within an hour of birth, globally, sixty percent of infants are not breastfed within this crucial first hour. Breastfeeding within the first hour of life protects the newborn from acquiring infections and reduces risk of death during the neonatal period.

Alternatively, breast milk can be expressed using a breast pump and administered via baby bottle, cup, spoon, supplementation drip system, or nasogastric tube. This method is especially beneficial for preterm babies who may initially lack the ability to suck effectively. Using cups to feed expressed breast milk and other supplements results in improved breastfeeding outcomes in terms of both duration and extent, compared with traditional bottle and tube feeding.

For mothers unable to produce an adequate supply of breast milk, the use of pasteurized donor human breast milk is a viable option. In the absence of pasteurized donor milk, commercial formula milk is recommended as a secondary alternative. However, unpasteurized breast milk from a source other than the infant's mother, particularly when shared informally, carries the risk of vertically transmitting bacteria, viruses (such as HIV), and other microorganisms from the donor to the infant, rendering it an unsafe alternative.

== Benefits ==
Breastfeeding offers health benefits to mother and child even after infancy. These benefits include proper heat production and adipose tissue development, a 73% decreased risk of sudden infant death syndrome, increased intelligence, decreased likelihood of contracting middle ear infections, cold and flu resistance, a tiny decrease in the risk of childhood leukemia, lower risk of childhood onset diabetes, decreased risk of asthma and eczema, decreased dental problems, decreased risk of obesity later in life, and a decreased risk of developing psychological disorders, including in adopted children. In addition, feeding an infant breast milk is associated with lower insulin levels and higher leptin levels compared feeding an infant via powdered-formula. Many of the infection-fighting and immune system related benefits are associated with human milk oligosaccharides.

Breastfeeding also provides health benefits for the mother. It assists the uterus in returning to its pre-pregnancy size and reduces post-partum bleeding, through the production of oxytocin (see Production). Breastfeeding can also reduce the risk of breast cancer later in life. Lactation may also reduce the risk for both mother and infant from both types of diabetes. Lactation may protect the infant from specifically developing Type 2 diabetes, as studies have shown that bioactive ingredients in human breast milk could prevent excess weight gain during childhood via contributing to a feeling of energy and satiety. The lower risk of child-onset diabetes may be more applicable to infants who were born from diabetic mothers. The reason is that while breastfeeding for at least the first six months of life minimizes the risk of type 1 diabetes from occurring in the infant, inadequate breastfeeding in an infant prenatally exposed to diabetes was associated with a higher risk of the child developing diabetes later. There are arguments that breastfeeding may contribute to protective effects against the development of type 1 diabetes because the alternative of bottle-feeding may expose infants to unhygienic feeding conditions.

Though it is almost universally prescribed, in some countries during the 1950s, the practice of breastfeeding went through a period of unpopularity and the use of infant formula was considered superior to breast milk. However, it is since universally recognized that there is no commercial formula that can adequately substitute for breast milk. In addition to the appropriate amounts of carbohydrate, protein, and fat, breast milk provides vitamins, minerals, digestive enzymes, and hormones. Breast milk also contains antibodies and lymphocytes from the mother that may help the baby resist infections. The immune function of breast milk is individualized, as the mother, through her touching and taking care of the baby, comes into contact with pathogens that colonize the baby, and, as a consequence, her body makes the appropriate antibodies and immune cells.

At around four months of age, the internal iron supplies of the infant, held in the hepatic cells of the liver, are exhausted. The American Academy of Pediatrics recommends that at this time that an iron supplement should be introduced. Other health organisations such as the NHS in the UK have no such recommendation. Breast milk contains less iron than formula, but the iron is more bioavailable as lactoferrin, which carries more safety for mothers and children than ferrous sulphate.

Both the AAP and the NHS recommend vitamin D supplementation for breastfed infants. Vitamin D can be synthesised by the infant via exposure to sunlight; however, many infants are deficient due to being kept indoors or living in areas with insufficient sunlight. Formula is supplemented with vitamin D for this reason.

== Production ==
Under the influence of the hormones prolactin and oxytocin, women produce milk after childbirth to feed the baby. The initial milk produced is referred to as colostrum, which is high in the immunoglobulin IgA, which coats the gastrointestinal tract. This helps to protect the newborn until its own immune system is functioning properly. It also creates a mild laxative effect, expelling meconium and helping to prevent the build-up of bilirubin (a contributory factor in jaundice). Male lactation can occur; the production or administration of the hormone prolactin is necessary to induce lactation (see male lactation).

Actual inability to produce enough milk is rare, with studies showing that mothers from malnourished regions still produce amounts of milk of similar quality to that of mothers in developed countries. There are many reasons a mother may not produce enough breast milk. Some of the most common reasons are an improper latch (i.e., the baby does not connect efficiently with the nipple), not nursing or pumping enough to meet supply, certain medications (including estrogen-containing hormonal contraceptives), illness, and dehydration. A rarer reason is Sheehan's syndrome, also known as postpartum hypopituitarism, which is associated with prolactin deficiency and may require hormone replacement.

The amount of milk produced depends on how often the mother is nursing and/or pumping: the more the mother nurses her baby or pumps, the more milk is produced. It is beneficial to nurse when the baby wants to nurse rather than on a schedule. A Cochrane review came to the conclusion that a greater volume of milk is expressed whilst listening to relaxing audio during breastfeeding, along with warming and massaging of the breast prior to and during feeding. A greater volume of milk expressed can also be attributed to instances where the mother starts pumping milk sooner, even if the infant is unable to breastfeed.

Sodium concentration is higher in hand-expressed milk, when compared with the use of manual and electric pumps, and fat content is higher when the breast has been massaged, in conjunction with listening to relaxing audio. This may be important for low birthweight infants. If pumping, it is helpful to have an electric, high-grade pump so that all of the milk ducts are stimulated. Galactagogues increase milk supply, although even herbal variants carry risks. Non-pharmaceutical methods should be tried first, such as pumping out the mother's breast milk supply often, warming or massaging the breast, as well as starting milk pumping earlier after the child is born if they cannot drink milk at the breast.

== Composition ==
Human breast milk
Nutritional value per 100 mL
- Energy: 65–78 kcal (270–330 kJ)
- Carbohydrates: 6.7-7.8 g
- Sugars lactose: 6.7-7.8 g
- Fat: 3.2-4.8 g
- Protein: 0.8-1.4 g
Vitamins and minerals
Vitamins	Quantity %DV^{†}
Vitamin A	220 IU
Thiamine (B1)	2% 21 μg
Riboflavin (B2)	3% 35 μg
Niacin (B3)	1% 0.15 mg
Vitamin B6	8% 9-21 μg
Folate (B9)	1% 2-5 μg
Vitamin B12	4% 0.1 μg
Vitamin C	4% 4 mg
Vitamin D	0% 2 IU
Vitamin E	1% 0.2 mg
Vitamin K	0% 0.2 μg
Minerals	Quantity %DV^{†}
Calcium	18% 20-25 mg
Copper	-0% 0.00001-0.00003 mg
Iron	-0% 0.03-0.07 mg
Magnesium	2% 3-3.5 mg
Manganese	-0% 0.0003-0.0004 mg
Phosphorus	11% 12-14 mg
Potassium	38% 40-55 mg
Selenium	-4% 1-2.5 μg
Sodium	14% 15-25 mg
Zinc	-0% 0.0001-0.0003 mg
- Other constituents: Quantity
- Water: 87-88 g
- ^{†}Percentages estimated using US recommendations for adults, except for potassium, which is estimated based on expert recommendation from the National Academies.

Breast milk contains fats, proteins, carbohydrates (including lactose and human milk oligosaccharides), and a varying composition of minerals and vitamins. The composition changes over a single feed as well as over the period of lactation. Changes are particularly pronounced in marsupials.

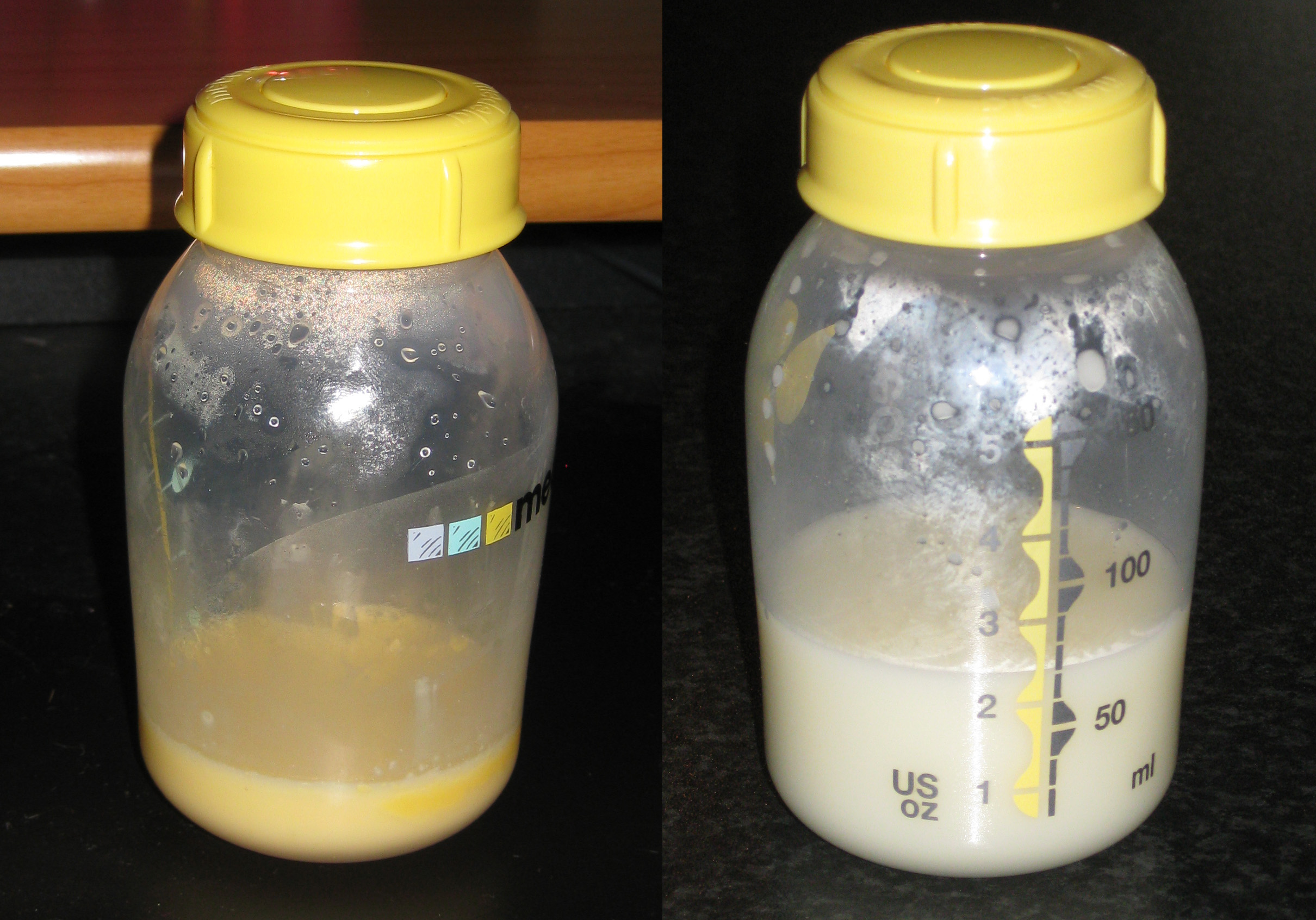
Colostrum vs breastmilk

During the first few days after delivery, the mother produces colostrum. This is a thin yellowish fluid that is the same fluid that sometimes leaks from the breasts during pregnancy. It is rich in protein and antibodies that provide passive immunity to the baby (the baby's immune system is not fully developed at birth). Colostrum also helps the newborn's digestive system to grow and function properly.

Colostrum will gradually change to become mature milk. In the first 3–4 days it will appear thin and watery and will taste very sweet; later, the milk will be thicker and creamier. Human milk quenches the baby's thirst and hunger and provides the proteins, sugar, minerals, and antibodies that the baby needs.

In the 1980s and 1990s, lactation professionals (De Cleats) used to make a differentiation between foremilk and hindmilk. But this differentiation causes confusion as there are not two types of milk. Instead, as a baby breastfeeds, the fat content very gradually increases, with the milk becoming fattier and fattier over time.

The level of Immunoglobulin A (IgA) in breast milk remains high from day 10 until at least 7.5 months post-partum.

Human milk contains 0.8–0.9% protein, 4.5% fat, 7.1% carbohydrates, and 0.2% ash (minerals). Carbohydrates are mainly lactose; several lactose-based oligosaccharides (also called human milk oligosaccharides) have been identified as minor components. The fat fraction contains specific triglycerides of palmitic and oleic acid (O-P-O triglycerides), and also lipids with trans bonds (see: trans fat). The lipids are vaccenic acid, and conjugated linoleic acid (CLA) accounting for up to 6% of the human milk fat.

The principal proteins are alpha-lactalbumin, lactoferrin (apo-lactoferrin), IgA, lysozyme, and serum albumin. In an acidic environment such as the stomach, alpha-lactalbumin unfolds into a different form and binds oleic acid to form a complex called HAMLET that kills tumor cells. This is thought to contribute to the protection of breastfed babies against cancer.

Non-protein nitrogen-containing compounds, making up 25% of the milk's nitrogen, include urea, uric acid, creatine, creatinine, amino acids, and nucleotides. Breast milk has circadian variations; some of the nucleotides are more commonly produced during the night, others during the day.

Mother's milk has been shown to supply endocannabinoids (the natural neurotransmitters that cannabis simulates) 2-arachidonoylglycerol, anandamide, oleoylethanolamide, palmitoylethanolamide, N-arachidonoyl glycine, eicosapentaenoyl ethanolamide, docosahexaenoyl ethanolamide, N-palmitoleoyl-ethanolamine, dihomo-γ-linolenoylethanolamine, N-stearoylethanolamine, prostaglandin F2alpha ethanolamides and prostaglandin F2 ethanolamides, Palmitic acid esters of hydroxy-stearic acids (PAHSAs). They may act as an appetite stimulant, but they also regulate appetite so infants do not eat too much. That may be why formula-fed babies have a higher caloric intake than breastfed babies.

Breast milk is not sterile and has its own microbiome, but contains as many as 600 different species of various bacteria, including beneficial Bifidobacterium breve, B. adolescentis, B. longum, B. bifidum, and B. dentium, which contribute to colonization of the infant gut. As a result, it can be defined as a probiotic food, depending on how one defines "probiotic". Breast milk also contains a variety of somatic cells and stem cells and the proportion of each cell type differs from individual to individual. The somatic cells are mainly lactocytes and myoepithelial cells derived from the mother's mammary glands. The stem cells found in human breast milk have been shown to be able to differentiate into a variety of other cells involved in the production of bodily tissues and a small proportion of these cross over the nursing infant's intestinal tract into the bloodstream to reach certain organs and transform into fully functional cells. Because of its diverse population of cells and multifarious functions, researchers have argued that breast milk should be considered a living tissue.

Breast milk contains a unique type of sugars, human milk oligosaccharides (HMOs), which were not present in traditional infant formula, however they are increasingly added by many manufacturers. HMOs are not digested by the infant but help to make up the intestinal flora. They act as decoy receptors that block the attachment of disease causing pathogens, which may help to prevent infectious diseases. They also alter immune cell responses, which may benefit the infant. As of 2015 more than a hundred different HMOs have been identified; both the number and composition vary between women and each HMO may have a distinct functionality.

The breast milk of diabetic mothers has been shown to have a different composition from that of non-diabetic mothers. It may contain elevated levels of glucose and insulin and decreased polyunsaturated fatty acids. A dose-dependent effect of diabetic breast milk on increasing language delays in infants has also been noted, although doctors recommend that diabetic mothers breastfeed despite this potential risk.

Women breastfeeding should consult with their physician regarding substances that can be unwittingly passed to the infant via breast milk, such as alcohol, viruses (HIV or HTLV-1), or medications. Even though most infants infected with HIV contract the disease from breastfeeding, most infants that are breastfed by their HIV positive mothers never contract the disease. While this paradoxical phenomenon suggests that the risk of HIV transmission between an HIV positive mother and her child via breastfeeding is small, studies have also shown that feeding infants with breast milk of HIV-positive mothers can actually have a preventative effect against HIV transmission between the mother and child. This inhibitory effect against the infant contracting HIV is likely due to unspecified factors exclusively present in breast milk of HIV-positive mothers.

Most women that do not breastfeed use infant formula, but breast milk donated by volunteers to human milk banks can be obtained by prescription in some countries. In addition, research has shown that women who rely on infant formula could minimize the gap between the level of immunity protection and cognitive abilities a breastfed child benefits from versus the degree to which a bottle-fed child benefits from them. This can be done by supplementing formula-fed infants with bovine milk fat globule membranes (MFGM) meant to mimic the positive effects of the MFGMs which are present in human breast milk.

== Storage of expressed breast milk ==
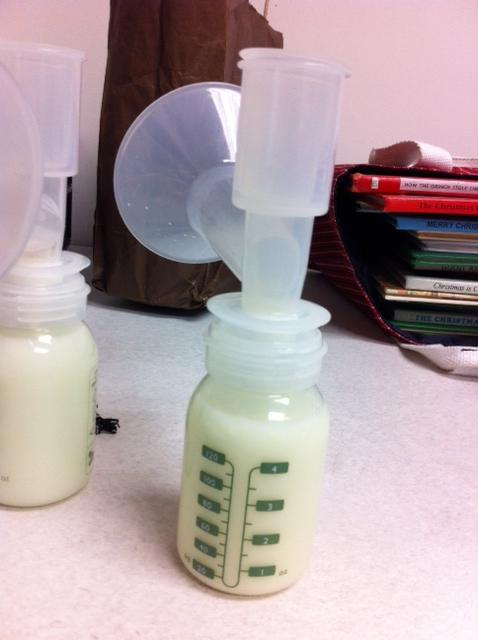
Bottle of pumped breast milk

Expressed breast milk can be stored. Lipase may cause thawed milk to taste soapy or rancid due to milk fat breakdown. It is still safe to use, and most babies will drink it. Scalding it will prevent rancid taste at the expense of antibodies. It should be stored with airtight seals. Some plastic bags are designed for storage periods of less than 72 hours. Others can be used for up to 12 months if frozen. This table describes safe storage time limits.

Place of storage	Temperature		Maximum storage time
In a room	25 °C	77 °F	Six to eight hours
Insulated thermal bag with ice packs			Up to 24 hours
In a refrigerator	4 °C	39 °F	Up to five days
Freezer compartment inside a refrigerator	−15 °C	5 °F	Two weeks
A combined refrigerator and freezer with separate doors	−18 °C	0 °F	Three to six months
Chest or upright manual defrost deep freezer	−20 °C	−4 °F	Six to twelve months

== Comparison to other milks ==
All mammalian species produce milk, but the composition of milk for each species varies widely and other kinds of milk are often very different from human breast milk. As a rule, the milk of mammals that nurse frequently (including human babies) is less rich, or more watery, than the milk of mammals whose young nurse less often. Human milk is noticeably thinner and sweeter than cow's milk.

Whole cow's milk contains too little iron, retinol, vitamin E, vitamin C, vitamin D, unsaturated fats or essential fatty acids for human babies. Whole cow's milk also contains too much protein, sodium, potassium, phosphorus and chloride which may put a strain on an infant's immature kidneys. In addition, the proteins, fats and calcium in whole cow's milk are more difficult for an infant to digest and absorb than the ones in breast milk.

The composition of marsupial and monotreme milk contains essential nutrients, growth factors and immunological properties to support the development of joeys and puggles.

Comparing milks (per cup [1cup=246g] in SI units of measurement)
Nutrient	Human milk	Cow milk (3.25% fat)	Goat milk
Calories (Kcal)	172	146	168
Water (g)	215	215	212
Protein (g)	2.5	7.9	8.7
Fat (g)	10.8	7.9	10.1
Saturated fat (g)	4.9	4.6	6.5
Monounsaturated fat (g)	4.1	2.0	2.7
Polyunsaturated fat (g)	1.2	0.5	0.4
Omega-3 fatty acids (mg)	128	183	97.6
Omega-6 fatty acids (mg)	920	293	266
Cholesterol (mg)	34.4	24.4	26.8
Carbohydrate (g)	17.0	11.0	10.9
Sugars (g)	17.0	11.0	10.9
Vitamin A (IU)	522	249	483
Vitamin C (mg)	12.3	0	3.2
Vitamin D (IU) *	9.8	97.6	29.3
Vitamin E (mg)	0.2	0.1	0.2
Vitamin K (mcg)	0.7	0.5	0.7
Thiamin (mg)	0.0	0.1	0.1
Riboflavin (mg)	0.1	0.4	0.3
Niacin (mg)	0.4	0.3	0.7
Vitamin B6 (mg)	0.0	0.1	0.1
Folate (mcg)	12	12	2
Vitamin B12 (mcg)	0.1	1.1	0.2
Pantothenic acid (mg)	0.5	0.9	0.8
Choline (mg)	39.4	34.9	39.0
Calcium (mg)	79	276	327
Iron (mg)	0.07	0.07	0.12
Magnesium (mg)	7.4	24.4	34.2
Phosphorus (mg)	34.4	222	271
Potassium (mg)	125	349	498
Sodium (mg)	42	98	122
Zinc (mg)	0.4	1.0	0.7
Copper (mg)	0.1	0.0	0.1
Manganese (mg)	0.1	0.0	0.0
Selenium (mcg)	4.4	9.0	3.4

* Note: Milk is generally fortified with vitamin D in the U.S. and Canada. Non-fortified milk contains only 2 IU per 3.5 oz.

== Effects of medications and other substances on milk content ==
Almost all medicines, or drugs, pass into breastmilk in small amounts by a concentration gradient. The amount of the drug bound by maternal plasma proteins, the size of the drug molecule, the pH and/or pKa of the drug, and the lipophilicity of the drug all determine whether and how much of the drug will pass into breastmilk. Medications that are mostly non-protein bound, low in molecular weight, and highly lipid-soluble are more likely to enter the breast milk in larger quantities. Some drugs have no effect on the baby and can be used whilst breastfeeding, while other medications may be dangerous and harmful to the infant.

Some medications considered generally safe for use by a breastfeeding mother, with a doctor's or pharmacist's advice, include simple analgesics or pain killers such as paracetamol/acetaminophen, anti-hypertensives such as the ACE-inhibitors enalapril and captopril, anti-depressants of the SSRI and SNRI classes, and medications for gastroesophageal reflux such as omeprazole and ranitidine.

Conversely, there are medications that are known to be toxic to the baby and thus should not be used in breastfeeding mothers, such as chemotherapeutic agents which are cytotoxic like doxorubicin, immunosuppressants like methotrexate, amiodarone, or lithium.

Furthermore, drugs of abuse, such as cocaine, amphetamines, heroin, and marijuana cause adverse effects on the infant during breastfeeding. Adverse effects include seizures, tremors, restlessness, and diarrhea.

To reduce infant exposure to medications used by the mother, use topical therapy or avoid taking the medication during breastfeeding times when possible.

Hormonal products and combined oral contraceptives should be avoided during the early postpartum period as they can interfere with lactation.

There are some medications that may stimulate the production of breast milk. These medications may be beneficial in cases where women with hypothyroidism may be unable to produce milk. A Cochrane review looked at the drug domperidone (10 mg three times per day) with results showing a significant increase in volume of milk produced over a period of one to two weeks. However, another review concluded little evidence that use of domperidone and metoclopramide to enhance milk supply works. Instead, non-pharmacological approaches such as support and more frequent breastfeeding may be more efficacious.

Finally, there are other substances besides medications that may appear in breast milk. Alcohol use during pregnancy carries a significant risk of serious birth defects, but consuming alcohol after the birth of the infant is considered safe. High caffeine intake by breastfeeding mothers may cause their infants to become irritable or have trouble sleeping. A meta-analysis has shown that breastfeeding mothers who smoke expose their infants to nicotine, which may cause respiratory illnesses, including otitis media in the nursing infant.

== Market ==
There is a commercial market for human breast milk, both in the form of a wet nurse service and as a milk product.

As a product, breast milk is exchanged by human milk banks, as well as directly between milk donors and customers as mediated by websites on the internet. Human milk banks generally have standardized measures for screening donors and storing the milk, sometimes even offering pasteurization, while milk donors on websites vary in regard to these measures. A study in 2013 came to the conclusion that 74% of breast milk samples from providers found from websites were colonized with gram-negative bacteria or had more than 10,000 colony-forming units/mL of aerobic bacteria. Bacterial growth happens during transit. According to the FDA, bad bacteria in food at room temperature can double every 20 minutes.

Human milk is considered to be healthier than cow's milk and infant formula when it comes to feeding an infant in the first six months of life, but only under extreme situations do international health organizations support feeding an infant breast milk from a healthy wet nurse rather than that of its biological mother. One reason is that the unregulated breast milk market is fraught with risks, such as drugs of abuse and prescription medications being present in donated breast milk. The transmission of these substances through breast milk can do more harm than good when it comes to the health outcomes of the infant recipient.

=== Fraud ===
In the United States, the online marketplace for breast milk is largely unregulated and the high premium has encouraged food fraud. Human breast milk may be diluted with other liquids to increase volume including cow's milk, soy milk, and water, thus undermining its health benefits.

A 2015 CBS article cites an editorial led by Dr. Sarah Steele in the Journal of the Royal Society of Medicine, in which they say that "health claims do not stand up clinically and that raw human milk purchased online poses many health risks." CBS found a study from the Center for Biobehavioral Health at Nationwide Children's Hospital in Columbus that "found that 11 out of 102 breast milk samples purchased online were actually blended with cow's milk." The article also explains that milk purchased online may be improperly sanitized or stored, so it may contain food-borne illness and infectious diseases such as hepatitis and HIV.

== Consumption by adults ==
=== Restaurants and recipes ===
A minority of people, including restaurateurs Hans Lochen of Switzerland and Daniel Angerer of Austria, who operate a restaurant in New York City, have used human breast milk, or at least advocated its use, as a substitute for cow's milk in dairy products and food recipes. An icecreamist in London's Covent Garden, The Licktators, started selling an ice cream named Baby Gaga in February 2011. Each serving cost £14. All the milk was donated by a Mrs. Hiley, who earned £15 for every 10 ounces and called it a "great recession beater". The ice cream sold out on its first day. Despite the success of the new flavour, the Westminster Council officers removed the product from the menu to make sure that it was, as they said, "fit for human consumption." Tammy Frissell-Deppe, a family counsellor specialized in attachment parenting, published a book, titled A Breastfeeding Mother's Secret Recipes, providing a lengthy compilation of detailed food and beverage recipes containing human breast milk. Human breast milk is not produced or distributed industrially or commercially, because the use of human breast milk as an adult food is considered unusual to the majority of cultures around the world, and most disapprove of such a practice.

In Costa Rica, there have been trials to produce human cheese, and custard from human milk, as an alternative to weaning.

=== Bodybuilders ===
While there is no scientific evidence that shows that breast milk is advantageous for adults, according to several 2015 news sources, breast milk is being used by bodybuilders for its nutritional value. In a February 2015 ABC News article, one former competitive bodybuilder said, "It isn't common, but I've known people who have done this. It's certainly talked about quite a bit on the bodybuilding forums on the Internet." Calling bodybuilders "a strange breed of individuals", he said, "Even if this type of thing is completely unsupported by research, they're prone to gym lore and willing to give it a shot if there is any potential effect." At the time the article was written, in the U.S., the price of breast milk procured from milk banks that pasteurize the milk, and have expensive quality and safety controls, was about $10 per US fluid ounce ($0.34/mL), and the price in the alternative market online, bought directly from mothers, ranges from $1–$4 per US fluid ounce ($0.03–$0.14/mL), compared to cow's milk at about $3.44 per US gallon ($0.0269/US fl oz; $0.0009/mL).

=== Lactophilia ===
Milk is being used as a fetish, loaded with cultural symbolism, employed as such and sometimes purchased as a sexual fetish.

Erotic lactation is the broader practice. For that purpose some couples decide to even induce lactation outside a pregnancy.

== Breast milk contamination ==
Breast milk is oftentimes used as an environmental bioindicator given its ability to accumulate certain chemicals, including organochlorine pesticides. Research has found that certain organic contaminants such as PCBs, organochlorine pesticides, PCDDs, PBDEs, and DDT can contaminate breastmilk. According to research done in 2002, the levels of the organochlorine pesticides, PCBs, and dioxins have declined in breast milk in countries where these chemicals have been banned or otherwise regulated, while levels of PBDEs are rising.

=== Pesticide contamination in breastmilk ===
Pesticides and other toxic substances bioaccumulate; i.e., creatures higher up the food chain will store more of them in their body fat. This is an issue in particular for the Inuit, whose traditional diet is predominantly meat. Studies are looking at the effects of polychlorinated biphenyls and persistent organic pollutants in the body; the breast milk of Inuit mothers is extraordinarily high in toxic compounds.

The CDC has provided some resources for breastfeeding mothers to reference for safe medication use, including LactMed, Mother to Baby, and The InfantRisk Center.

=== Contamination effects of organochlorine pesticides on infants ===
When a mother is exposed to organochlorine pesticides (OCP's), her infant can be exposed to these OCP's through breast milk intake. This result is supported by a study done in India, which revealed that in each lactation period there is a loss of OCPs from the mother's body involved in the nursing of their children. A longitudinal study was conducted to assess pesticide residues in human breast milk samples and evaluate the risk-exposure of infants to these pesticides from consumption of mother's milk in Ethiopia. The estimated daily intake (EDI) of infants in the present study was above provisional tolerable daily intake (PTDI) during the first month of breastfeeding which indicates that there is a health risk for infants consuming breast milk at an early stage of breastfeeding in the study areas. Based on these studies, the exposure of women during pregnancy to these OCPs may lead to various health problems for fetus such as low birth weight, disturbance of thyroid hormone, and neurodevelopmental delay.

== In culture ==
Milk and particularly breast milk has been associated with many qualities and symbolism beyond its main use throughout history and across cultures.

== See also ==
- Breastmilk storage and handling
- Blocked milk duct
- Breastfeeding in public
- Breast milk jewelry
- Human milk banking in North America
- La Leche League International
- Lactation room
- Lactivism
- Mary Rose Tully
