= Breast milk jewelry =

Keepsake jewelry made with breast milk

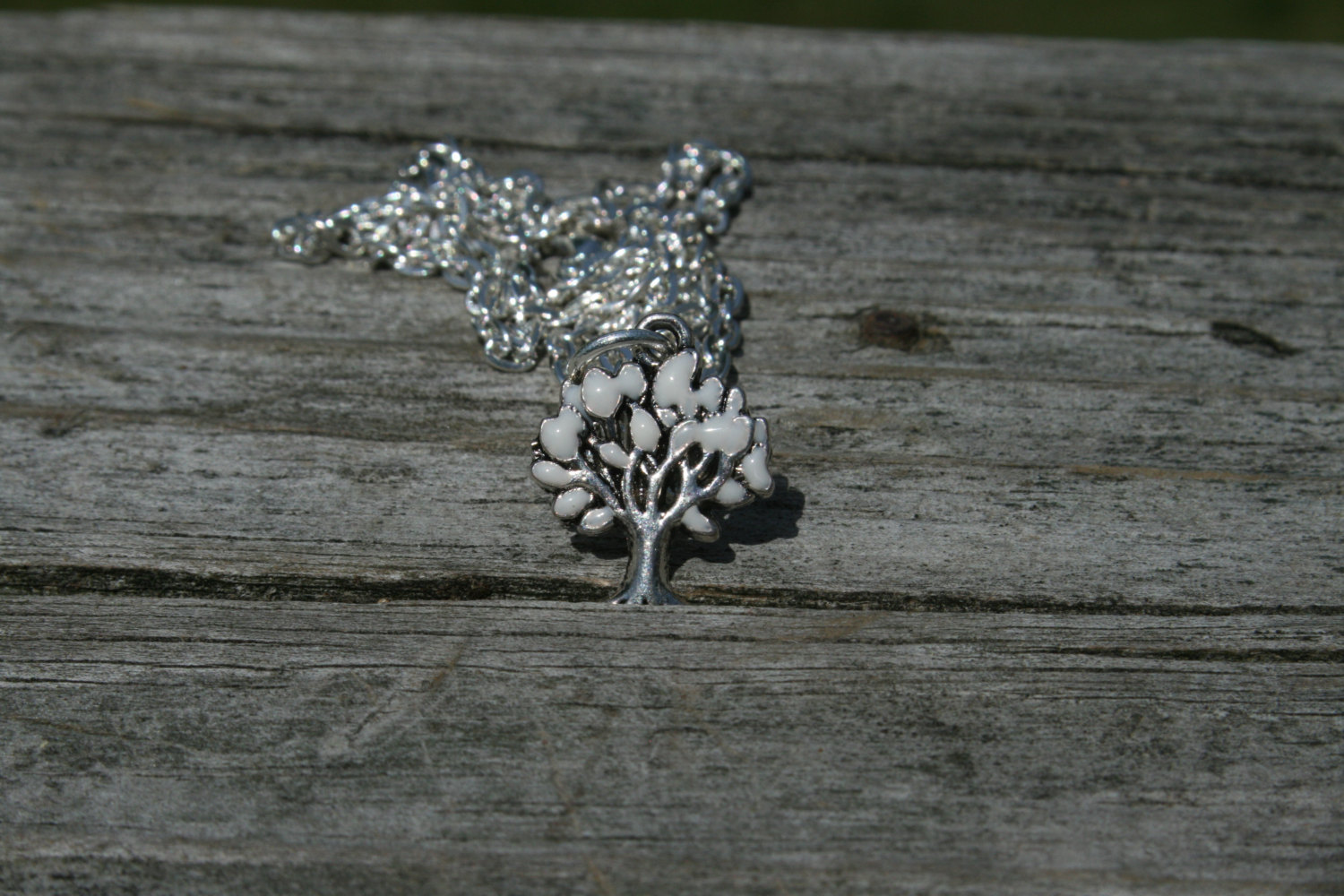
A silver pendant filled with breast milk.

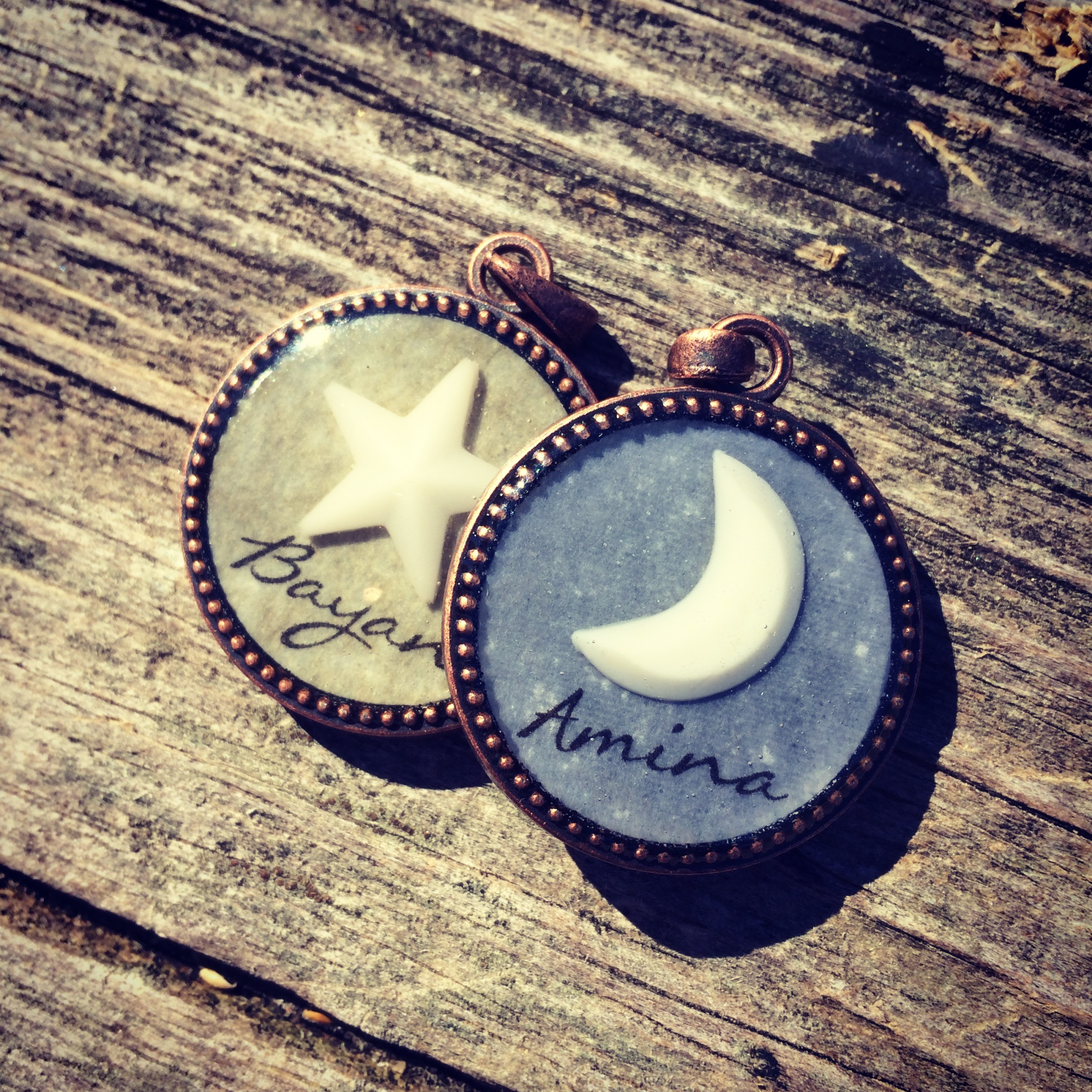
Bezel set breast milk pendants in crescent and star shapes.

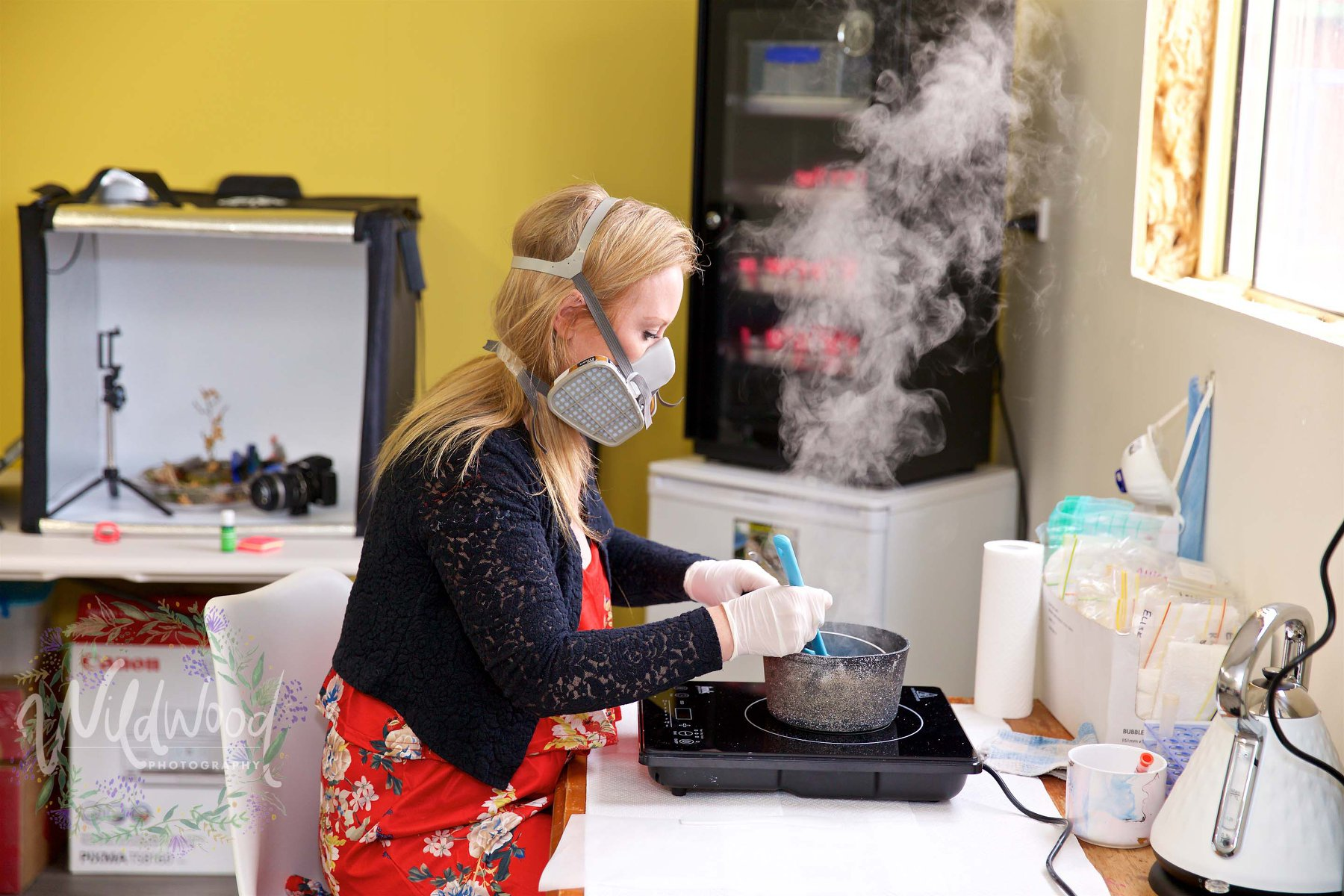
A breastmilk jewellery artist, professionally preserving breastmilk.

Breast milk jewelry or Breast milk jewellery (Commonwealth English) is jewellery made from pumped or expressed mother's breast milk as a keepsake often worn by the mother. Breast milk keepsakes come in various jewelry types such as rings, lockets, pendants and popular European style beads. Some pendants may be bezel set, locket set, made from only resin, or filled. Filled styles use a preserved breast milk and resin mix to fill holes or openings in jewelry pieces, usually Sterling Silver. Generally, the filled shapes are trees, leaves, or hearts representing love and life.

Various methods may be used to make the jewelry. To preserve and protect it, the piece may be covered in a clear resin or glaze. No matter the process used for preservation there seems to be a long and tedious process involved in creating the keepsakes, leading to long waits for order fulfillment. The long waits for order fulfillment have caused online speculation about the practice, even gaining media attention.

== Origin ==
In 2013 NBC New York published an article about the jewellery, mentioning two Etsy artists (from Rhode Island and South Carolina) that reportedly started the idea as early as 2007.

== Process ==
After the purchase of a breast milk keepsake design the consumer sends their breast milk to the creator so the process can begin. Each creator likely uses a different trade process. In some methods it is believed that solvents or chemicals are added to assist the preservation. Other methods may include dehydrating, freeze drying, cooking down, or mixing breast milk with other media.

Once the preserved breast milk and resin mixture is ready, it is carefully poured into molds, or a bezel setting, to create the desired stone shape. The molds can be customized to create various designs like those found in traditional jewelry design, hearts, flowers, or abstract shapes. The mixture is left to cure and harden, which can take several hours or even days depending on the specific resin used.

== See also ==
- Galalith
